= Interactive Fiction Collections =

- Genre: Compilation
- Developer: Infocom
- Publisher: Activision
- Platforms: MS-DOS, Classic Mac OS
- Original release: 1995

Interactive Fiction Collections is a series of video game compilations developed by Infocom and published in 1995 by Activision for MS-DOS and Classic Mac OS.

== Contents ==
The Interactive Fiction Collections are a series of five video game collections containing 31 of Infocom's 35 canonical titles, with themes of adventure, comedy, fantasy, mystery, and science fiction.

- The Adventure Collection contains Border Zone, Cutthroats, Infidel, Plundered Hearts, and Trinity. Bonus titles are Planetfall and Zork III.
- The Comedy Collection contains Ballyhoo, Bureaucracy, Hollywood Hijinx and Nord and Bert Couldn't Make Head or Tail of It). Bonus titles are Planetfall and Zork I.
- The Fantasy Collection contains Enchanter, Seastalker, Spellbreaker, Sorcerer, and Wishbringer. Bonus title are Planetfall and Zork II.
- The Mystery Collection contains Deadline, The Lurking Horror, Moonmist, Sherlock: The Riddle of the Crown Jewels, Suspect and The Witness. Bonus titles are Planetfall and Zork Zero.
- The Science Fiction Collection contains A Mind Forever Voyaging, Hitchhikers Guide to the Galaxy, Starcross, Stationfall, and Suspended. Bonus titles are Beyond Zork and Planetfall.

Infocom titles not included in these collections were Arthur: The Quest for Excalibur, Journey: The Quest Begins, Leather Goddesses of Phobos, and James Clavell's Shōgun.

== Reception ==
Next Generation rated the collections five stars out of five, and stated that "Simply put, these are some of the greatest adventure games of all time. [...] if you want to have anything approaching a complete game library, you'll need to grab all of these." Kathleen Keating of World Village (Gamer's Zone) gave The Mystery Collection four out of five, feeling it offered quality entertainment value and could help players develop imagination and creative thinking abilities. She regarded the graphics and sound as "the best because they originate in your mind." Steve Bauman of Computer Games Strategy Plus commented that the compilations were definitely worth owning, but criticized the distributor's claim that they were Windows 95-compatibile while only including PIF files for running them under MS-DOS.
