= Classic Text Adventure Masterpieces of Infocom =

Collection of video games from 1996

Classic Text Adventure Masterpieces of Infocom is a collection of 33 computer games from interactive fiction pioneer Infocom, and the top 6 winners of the 1995 Interactive Fiction Competition, released in 1996. All 39 games are combined on a single cross-platform CD-ROM, which also includes PDFs of all the Infocom games' instructions, maps, and hint booklets.

Infocom was closed in 1989 by its then-parent company Activision. Still holding the copyright to nearly all the past Infocom titles, Activision bundled them together in this collection, following up the earlier Lost Treasures of Infocom series. The Infocom games included are:

- Arthur: The Quest for Excalibur
- Ballyhoo
- Beyond Zork
- Border Zone
- Bureaucracy
- Cutthroats
- Deadline
- Enchanter
- Hollywood Hijinx
- Infidel
- Journey
- Leather Goddesses of Phobos
- The Lurking Horror
- A Mind Forever Voyaging
- Moonmist
- Nord and Bert Couldn't Make Head or Tail of It
- Planetfall
- Plundered Hearts
- Seastalker
- Sherlock: The Riddle of the Crown Jewels
- Sorcerer
- Spellbreaker
- Starcross
- Stationfall
- Suspect
- Suspended
- Trinity
- Wishbringer
- The Witness
- Zork I
- Zork II
- Zork III
- Zork Zero

The Interactive Fiction Competition winners included are:

- A Change in the Weather
- The Magic Toyshop
- The Mind Electric
- The One That Got Away
- Toonesia
- Uncle Zebulon's Will

The collection includes all the contents of the two Lost Treasures of Infocom collections except for The Hitchhiker's Guide to the Galaxy and James Clavell's Shōgun. The rights to these two games, based on novels by Douglas Adams and James Clavell, respectively, had reverted to the novels' authors. Unlike the Lost Treasures collections, though, Masterpieces included the adult game Leather Goddesses of Phobos.

== Reception ==
A reviewer for Next Generation scored the compilation a perfect five out of five stars. He praised the "functionally comprehensive" selection of Infocom games and the six Interactive Fiction Competition games, estimated the total playtime at 1,200 hours minimum, and said the gameplay "represents the pinnacle of well written, interactive fiction."
