= The Lost Treasures of Infocom =

1991 video game

- Developer: Infocom
- Publisher: Activision
- Platforms: Amiga, Apple IIGS, Macintosh, MS-DOS, iOS
- Release: 1991
- Genre: Interactive fiction
- Mode: Single player

The Lost Treasures of Infocom is a 1991 compilation of 20 previously released interactive fiction games developed by Infocom. It was published by Activision for MS-DOS, Macintosh, Amiga, and Apple IIGS versions. It was later re-released on CD-ROM, and in 2012 on iOS.

== Gameplay ==
The Lost Treasures of Infocom compiles 20 interactive fiction titles, with which the player interacts via text parser.

The compilation includes Zork I, II and III, along with the Zork-connected games Beyond Zork, Zork Zero, Enchanter, Sorcerer and Spellbreaker. The other titles included are Deadline, The Witness, Suspect, The Lurking Horror, Ballyhoo, Infidel, Moonmist, Starcross, Suspended, Planetfall, Stationfall and The Hitchhiker's Guide to the Galaxy.

The package contains all the instructions (bound in one volume) and maps for each game as well as all the InvisiClues, printed normally instead of using "invisible" ink. The package also features a launch menu which lets the user select which one of the 20 games they wish to play.

Some significant omissions from the package were the "feelies" for which Infocom had become known. The package merely contained photocopies or pictures of these items, such as the sunglasses from Hitchhiker's Guide and the Stellar Patrol ID card from Planetfall.

== Development ==
Discussing the announcement of The Lost Treasures of Infocom, Scorpia of Computer Gaming World noted that Activision was "rising like a phoenix ... from the bankrupt ashes of Mediagenic" with the release. After the company's restructuring during bankruptcy, it began to lean on its back catalog of licenses, including Zork. Activision CEO Bobby Kotick later said that "Zork on a brick would sell 100,000 copies". Infocom had been closed by Activision in 1989; the publisher held the copyright to nearly all the past Infocom titles.

An additional bonus was the updated version of Hitchhiker's Guide. The game was repackaged using a later version of the Z-machine than the original, and now featured a built-in hint system.

== Reception ==
The Lost Treasures of Infocom was a commercial hit. Peter Doctorow of Activision reported in 1992 that The Lost Treasures of Infocom was "selling extremely well". Jeremy Reimer of Ars Technica wrote, "Retailing for $99, it sold over 100,000 copies and was almost pure profit. The ashes of Infocom saved Activision from bankruptcy."

Brian Walker of Computer Games Strategy Plus declared The Lost Treasures of Infocom Activision's best game of 1992. Reviewing the iOS version of the game in 2017, TouchArcade gave it a strongly positive review.

== Sequel ==
The Lost Treasures of Infocom II
- Developer: Infocom
- Publisher: Activision
- Platforms: Apple Macintosh, MS-DOS
- Release: 1992
- Genre: Interactive fiction
- Mode: Single player

The success of the original Lost Treasures of Infocom prompted a follow-up collection published in 1992 titled The Lost Treasures of Infocom II. This package contained 11 more classic Infocom titles. The games included in Lost Treasures II were:

- Border Zone
- A Mind Forever Voyaging
- Plundered Hearts
- Bureaucracy
- Cutthroats
- Hollywood Hijinx
- Seastalker
- Sherlock: The Riddle of the Crown Jewels
- Wishbringer
- Nord and Bert Couldn't Make Head or Tail of It
- Trinity

Leather Goddesses of Phobos was not included, but could be ordered for $9.95 via an enclosed coupon.

The games' InvisiClues were not included as before; instead, a card advertising a pay-per-minute hint line was included in the package.

In addition to being dual-format (MS-DOS and Apple Macintosh), the CD-ROM version included three extra games:

- James Clavell's Shōgun
- Arthur: The Quest for Excalibur
- Journey

The Soul of the Samurai and Known World maps from Shogun and the map from Journey were included separately; an added instruction manual included the Book of Hours from Arthur as well as instructions for all three added games.

== See also ==
- Classic Text Adventure Masterpieces of Infocom, 1996
