= Al Vezza =

American computer scientist and academic (1934–2025)

Umberto "Albert" Vezza (July 30, 1934 – April 23, 2025) was an American computer scientist and academic who was the founder of video game company Infocom.

== Life and career ==
Vezza was the assistant director of MIT's Laboratory for Computer Science (LCS) and in charge of LCS's Dynamic Modeling (DM) group in the late 1970s when group members Dave Lebling, Marc Blank, Tim Anderson, and Bruce Daniels began creating the game that would become Zork. By 1979, many of the graduating students in the DM group were interested in continuing to work together by establishing a company, and Vezza, who had long wanted to bring together his former students in a commercial venture, agreed to help fund the company, named Infocom.

He became a member of the board of directors of Infocom when it was incorporated on June 22, 1979. While the computer game business brought Infocom quick success, Vezza and others on the board were not convinced that computer games would remain a viable market over the long haul and advocated a move into business software. As Infocom began seeking out venture capital firms to invest in the company, the board decided that an actual CEO would be an asset in attracting investment and that an experienced project leader like Vezza would attract more confidence from firms than the younger game designers. As a result, Vezza was named CEO of the company and took on that role beginning in January 1984.

As CEO, Vezza was responsible for guiding Infocom's new foray into business software. He oversaw Infocom during a period when rising development costs related to the Cornerstone database project, and feuding between the game and business software sides of the business, created a great strain on the company. In 1985, the failure of Cornerstone to carve out a place in the business world, combined with flat game sales, led to a period of financial difficulty and layoffs. Finally, in 1986 Infocom was sold to rival game company Activision and Vezza stepped down as CEO.

Vezza died on April 23, 2025, at the age of 90.
