= Zork Anthology =

1994 video game

The Zork Anthology
- Developer: Infocom
- Publisher: Activision
- Series: Zork
- Engine: Z-machine
- Platforms: MS-DOS, Windows, Mac OS
- Release: 1994
- Genre: Text adventure
- Mode: Single-player

The Zork Anthology is a text adventure video game compilation developed by Infocom and published in 1994 by Activision for the PC. A version compatible with modern computers was published by digital distribution platforms GOG.com and Steam in 2011 and 2017 respectively.

== Contents and release ==
Developed by Infocom and published by Activision for MS-DOS, Windows, and Mac OS, The Zork Anthology is a six-game compilation containing the original Zork trilogy (Zork I, II, and III), Beyond Zork, Zork Zero, and Planetfall. The collection was originally a free bonus disc with Return to Zork at the end of 1994. It was then sold as its own retail release at the start of 1995. The package included printed maps and InvisiClues that were originally offered separately by Infocom.

The Zork Anthology was re-released digitally for more modern operating systems via GOG.com on January 18, 2011 and Steam on April 18, 2017.

== Reception ==
Reception

Review scores
Publication	Score
Next Generation	3/5
CD-ROM Today	3.5/5
CD-ROM Magazine	3.5/5
Computer Player	8/10
PC Power	80%

Next Generation reviewed the compilation, rating it three stars out of five, and stated that "Zork Anthology is an enchantingly nostalgic as well as a welcome return to the past".
