= Tim Anderson (programmer) =

American computer programmer (born 1954)

- Born: February 1954 (age 72)
- Education: Massachusetts Institute of Technology (BSc, 1975; MS, 1977)
- Occupations: Video game designer, computer programmer
- Known for: Zork, co-founder of Infocom

Tim Anderson is an American computer programmer best known for co-creating the adventure game Zork, one of the first works of interactive fiction and an early descendant of ADVENT (also known as Colossal Cave Adventure).

== Career ==
While attending MIT, Anderson got his start in game development by developing the game Trivia (1976) alongside future collaborator Marc Blank for the DEC PDP-10, the school's mainframe, playable over ARPANET. Trivia proved itself popular with the limited userbase of ARPANET, leading Anderson and Blank, as well as Bruce Daniels and Dave Lebling to collaborate on a new game. All four were members of the Dynamic Modeling Group at the MIT Laboratory for Computer Science, with all but Blank working by day writing software for DARPA, which afforded them access to MIT's mainframe, even after they had graduated. The team had spent a considerable amount of time working on solving the game Colossal Cave Adventure, mostly referred to at that time as simply Adventure. The team enjoyed Adventure, but found themselves frustrated with the limited interface of the game, specifically its two-word command structure. Bolstered by their earlier experience writing games for the PDP-10, the team set out to create what would eventually become Zork. Originally developed from 1977 to 1979 in the MDL programming language for the PDP-10, Zork would prove immensely popular on ARPANET. After the success of Zork on its limited platform, Anderson and the other members of the team founded Infocom, initially with no actual business plans, but settling on porting Zork to home computers.

The home computer ports of Zork would prove immensely successful, and Infocom grew rapidly, focusing on producing new text adventures, as well as branching out into business software. Anderson would take on the title of "senior scientist, special-projects programmer" within the company, mostly assisting with development of new games. The company's expansion into business software ultimately caused them to de-emphasize game production, which lead to their eventual demise in 1989.

After Infocom shut down, Anderson held a variety of positions in the defense and business sectors, including serving as the CTO of OffRoad Capital, a dot-com bubble startup for investing in private equity online. The San Francisco-based firm maintained the first Internet site that allowed high-net-worth individuals to invest electronically in established, growing companies.

== Personal life ==
Anderson obtained his bachelor's degree from MIT in 1975, and his masters in 1977, both in Computer science. Since 1996 Anderson has lived in Sudbury, Massachusetts, and has been active in local politics, seeking election on more than one occasion.
