= Zork Zero =

1988 text adventure game

- Developer: Infocom
- Publisher: Infocom
- Designer: Steve Meretzky
- Artist: James Shook
- Engine: Z-code version 6
- Platforms: Amiga, Apple II, MS-DOS, Mac
- Release: Mac: October 19, 1988; Amiga: March 23, 1989; Apple II: June 2, 1989; MS-DOS: July 14, 1989
- Genre: Interactive fiction
- Mode: Single-player

Zork Zero: The Revenge of Megaboz is an interactive fiction video game, written by Steve Meretzky over nearly 18 months and published by Infocom in 1988. Although it is the ninth and last Zork game released by Infocom before the company's closure, Zork Zero takes place before the previous eight games (Zork I, Zork II, Zork III, Enchanter, Sorcerer, Wishbringer, Spellbreaker and Beyond Zork). Unlike its predecessors, Zork Zero is a vast game, featuring a graphical interface with scene-based colors and borders, an interactive map, menus, an in-game hints system, an interactive Encyclopedia Frobozzica, and playable graphical mini-games. The graphics were created by computer artist James Shook. It is Infocom's thirty-second game.

Previous games by Infocom used a parser evolved from the one in Zork I, but for Zork Zero, they designed a new LALR parser from scratch. Zork Zero's parser has some innovative features. If it notices if a player is having trouble with it, it offers helpful suggestions, such as sample commands.

Three of the four graphical mini-games are based on older logic puzzles. Peggleboz is a version of peg solitaire, Snarfem is Nim, and the Tower of Bozbar is Towers of Hanoi. Other puzzles based on established logic puzzle types include a river-crossing puzzle with a fox, a rooster, and a worm, and a Knights and Knaves puzzle in which violently xenophobic Veritassi and Prevaricons are truth-tellers and liars respectively, and peaceful Wishyfoo are alternators.

== Plot ==
Lord Dimwit Flathead the Excessive certainly earned his nickname. Never one to do things on a small scale, when Dimwit decided in 789 GUE to have a statue erected in his honor, it had to be the largest statue ever. This angered a local resident of Fublio Valley (where the statue was built), Megaboz the Magnificent, who cast a deadly curse over Dimwit, the royal family, and the entire Empire before disappearing. The king's conjurers employed their most powerful magic in an effort to counteract the curse, but they were unable to save Dimwit and his eleven siblings; they only managed to delay the kingdom's destruction temporarily.

Zork Zero prelude (in Windows Frotz interpreter). The compass rose at the top highlights available exits. Some room descriptions had icons, also used in dynamic maps.

The game begins with a brief prelude in which the player is a humble servant in Lord Dimwit's scullery. Present when Megaboz appears and casts his fateful curse, the player manages to grab a small piece of parchment left behind in the chaos.

94 years later, the strength of the counter-curse is rapidly fading. If the curse can't be lifted by Curse Day, the anniversary of Dimwit's death, the Empire will surely fall. The reigning monarch, Wurb Flathead, has sent out a call in desperation: anyone who can save the Empire will be given half its riches! Predictably, this results in an avalanche of crackpot treasure seekers, none of whom have any more luck than did the royal sorcerers.

As the game begins in earnest, it is Mumberbur 14: Curse Day. The erstwhile curse-breakers have fled, along with everyone else in Flathead Castle. The player, a descendant of the servant from the prelude, awakes on the floor of the castle armed only with the scrap of parchment. The only other person around is the court's jester, who alternately helps and opposes the player in the quest to lift the curse.

Two items belonging to each of the "accursed twelve" (that is, Dimwit Flathead and his eleven siblings) must be placed into the cauldron and the magic word must be spoken. The game revolves around gathering these twenty-four objects and discovering the magic word. To accomplish this, the player will play the legendary game of Double Fanucci, travel to every corner of the Empire, solve a collection of riddles and logic puzzles, and visit the enormous statue that started all this trouble. There are even visits to locations such as the top of the world, and under the world (from which the player can fall). Flamingos, magic, bottomless pits and a unique sense of humor all feature along the way.

What happens when the curse is finally lifted is the game's final surprise. If you leave the castle and pass the perimeter wall, you arrive at the opening scene of Zork 1.

== Feelies ==
Like most other Infocom games, Zork Zero comes with feelies: a printed calendar titled "The Flathead Calendar 883" with portraits and biographies of the Twelve Flatheads (also usable as a 1989 calendar, (Note: Also usable as a 2023, 2034, or 2045 calendar.) folded blueprints with a yellow Post-it note attached, and a scrap of parchment. Since completing the game requires information revealed only in these feelies, they serve to discourage unauthorized copying.

== Double Fanucci ==
Zork Zero Double Fanucci mini-game (in Windows Frotz interpreter) in progress

Zork Zero includes a mini-game to play Double Fanucci against the jester. Double Fanucci is a fictional card game mentioned throughout the Zork series. As the in-game Encyclopedia Frobozzica describes it,

Legend has it that Double Fanucci (or Fannucci) was invented by the deposed Zilbo III in the late seventh century. A game of tremendous complexity and almost infinite rules, King Mumberthrax proclaimed it the national sport of the Empire in 757 GUE. The annual Double Fanucci Championships, held in Borphee during early autumn, frequently leave thousands homeless.

It is immensely complicated, parodying card games with complex rules in a manner similar to Fizzbin or Mornington Crescent.

As played in Zork Zero, (Note: Many other rule sets are implied: "We'll be playing according to Revised Miznian Rules, Seventh-Level Amendments, with these exceptions: no side-handling after an underfunded discard, two draws after a Skybreaker, and an extra muttonation if the conditions of Rule 17.4.1.B are met. Oh, also all the house rules adopted by the Fanucci Casino Rebuilding Act of 817.") cards appear in 15 numbered suits (Books, Bugs, Ears, Faces, Fromps, Hives, Inkblots, Lamps, Mazes, Plungers, Rain, Scythes, Time, Tops and Zurfs) with ranks from 0 (called "Naught"), 1 ("Singled"), 2 ("Doubled"), 3 ("Trebled"), up to 9, and infinity ("Infinite"). There are nine additional cards, like Major Arcana or "Trumps" in Tarot, which are unranked: Granola, the Lobster, the Snail, the Jester, Time, Light, Beauty, Death, and the Grue. (Note: Other suits and ranks are mentioned in "Kob on Double Fanucci" (PDF). The Status Line. V (3). Infocom: 8. Summer 1986. The article recounts the fictional 904 annual championships at Borphee. That game used Scythes, Books, Zurfs, Fromps, and three other suits identified only by symbol, and included such cards as the 77 of Fromps, the Q of Fromps, the Black of Zurfs, and the Hydronium Ion of Books. For the 72nd year in a row, the tournament ended without a clear winner, but fans nevertheless swept onto the field for a traditional eating of the goalposts.) It is possible to get four copies of the same card in a four-card hand.

To win the Double Fanucci mini-game, the player must use an unbeatable strategy mentioned only in the calendar feelie's biography of Babe Flathead.

Try as he might, Babe could not master Double Fanucci. Even the unexplained disappearance of the 339 leading Double Fanucci players failed to get Babe into the championships. Fanucci experts believe that Babe's difficulty with the game could be traced to one weakness: his failure to remember that three undertrumps after an opponent's discard of a Trebled Fromp is an indefensible gambit.

Otherwise, the mini-game will continue until when the score of the player or the jester exceeds 1241 points, but "by Rules Committee Amendment #493, the game is suspended and must be replayed in its entirety, except during a Frotz Moon or in a six-player game where at least three of the players are of Mithican ancestry."

Double Fanucci cards were featured prominently in the browser-based game Legends of Zork, drawn by artist Greg Brown and colored by Jim "Zubby" Zubkavich. Dave Howell has created a physical deck of "Deluxe" Fanucci cards along with some other (playable) games to go with them.

== Reception ==
Dave Arneson gave Zork Zero a favorable review in Computer Gaming World, calling it the best of the series to date. He praised the in-game map and help system, and later described the game as superior to Infocom's James Clavell's Shōgun.

James V. Trunzo reviewed Zork Zero in White Wolf #17 (1989) and stated that "Zork Zero, even though graphically quite pleasing, remains at heart an interactive story in which you make the choices and determine the course of action."

== Reviews ==
- Games #97

== See also ==
- Return to Zork (1993), the next Zork game by Activision

== Notes ==
Zork Zero was also included in the 1991 collection The Lost Treasures of Infocom, and in the 1996 collection Classic Text Adventure Masterpieces of Infocom, released by Activision under the Infocom brand.

The jester in Zork Zero will sometimes say So long, and thanks for all the fish, a reference to The Hitchhiker's Guide to the Galaxy, which was also adapted as an eponymous Infocom video game.
