= Fooblitzky =

1985 video game

- Developer: Infocom
- Publisher: Infocom
- Designers: Marc Blank; Michael Berlyn; Poh C. Lim; Paula Maxwell
- Engine: GZIP - Graphical Zork Interpreter Program
- Platforms: Apple II, Atari 8-bit, MS-DOS
- Release: 1985
- Genre: Board game
- Mode: Multiplayer

Fooblitzky is a board game-style video game published by Infocom in 1985 and designed by a team which included interactive fiction authors Marc Blank and Michael Berlyn. It is unique among Infocom titles for not being interactive fiction and for being the first to incorporate graphics beyond ASCII characters. Unlike most Infocom games, it was only released for the Apple II, Atari 8-bit computers, and IBM PC compatibles.

== Gameplay ==
Infocom marketed Fooblitzky as a "Graphic Strategy Game", and gameplay was compared to that of Clue and Mastermind. Two to four players travel around the virtual city of Fooblitzky, spending "foobles" and attempt to deduce what four objects are needed to win the game (and then obtain them).

Players buy objects in stores and can visit City Hall to have their possessions evaluated. Much in the same style as Mastermind, the player is told how many of their objects are correct, but not which ones.

== Release ==
Each box contained four sets of laminated game boards and erasable markers which could be used to track the progress of a game. Two sets of documentation were also included: a set of "quick-start" guidelines ("The Bare Essentials") and a more detailed set ("Official Ordinances").

== Reception ==
As a test, for the first six months, Fooblitzky was only advertised to those on Infocom's mailing list, although others could order it from the company. It sold very poorly; Infocom sold only 8,225 copies through 1986, the fewest of the five titles introduced in 1985, and from 1987 to 1989, the number of copies returned exceeded those sold.

Computer Gaming World called Fooblitzky "a fun way to spend time with a few friends", stating that the advertising comparing it to Mastermind and Clue was correct. It noted that the game began as an Infocom project to see if graphical games could be written for easy porting between computers like the company's text adventures, and criticized the Atari version's resulting graphics as "jerky and slow". COMPUTE! stated "probably no game on the computer software market today gives one the feel of playing a board game as much as does Fooblitzky", adding that the principles Fooblitzky used were the same ones which made Monopoly popular. Cautioning that because it was so different from other computer games "it probably isn't for everyone's tastes", the magazine recommended Fooblitzky for those seeking a game for families to enjoy.
