= Cornerstone (software) =

Relational database for MS-DOS

- Developer: Infocom
- Release: 1985; 41 years ago
- Operating system: MS-DOS
- Type: Relational database

Cornerstone is a relational database for MS-DOS released by Infocom, a company best known in the 1980s for developing interactive fiction video games. Initially hailed upon release in 1985 for its ease of use, a series of shortcomings and changes in the market kept Cornerstone from achieving success. It is considered a key factor in Infocom's demise.

== Development ==
Although well known for its interactive fiction games, Infocom was not founded as a video game company, but to develop business products. Before forming the company, several of the founders had created the game Zork on mainframes while attending or working at MIT. When they joined to form Infocom, Zork was a natural choice as a first product because it was practically complete and didn't require much up-front funding. The enormous success of the game and its sequels (which were actually the other portions of the original mainframe game, which had been split into pieces that early personal computers could handle) led to the development of more interactive titles, due in large part to the highly portable technology the company developed for intelligent parsing.

Despite the success of its game titles, the original founders of Infocom were still intent on developing business products, which sold for much more than games. Lotus Development, located in the same Cambridge, Massachusetts building as Infocom, debuted Lotus 1-2-3 in January 1983; the spreadsheet was immediately successful, and Lotus's sales were more than eight times as much that year as Infocom's. After deliberation, Infocom's board of directors decided to develop a relational database application for business users.

=== Contemporary databases ===
Database applications contemporary with Cornerstone were fairly inaccessible to non-programmers. The leading database application of the day, dBase II, required complex command-line commands even for the simplest operations. The Cornerstone developers were determined to make ease-of-use their chief priority. Dozens of people were hired in programming, marketing and other areas to swell Infocom's ranks to over 100 employees.

=== Funding ===
While development of Cornerstone was going well, it required an enormous amount of capital. Infocom borrowed heavily and used a sole source of venture capital. Profits from their interactive fiction titles were diverted to help fund Cornerstone, a move that disturbed many employees of the game division and led to an adversarial attitude towards the business division among some.

=== Design decisions ===
One development decision that proved fateful for the product—and the company as a whole—was the decision to make Cornerstone run via a virtual machine (VM). The use of Infocom's "Z-machine" for its interactive titles had been a huge boon: since all the games were written in an intermediate language (called ZIL), the company could release one title for every major platform simultaneously. The developers hoped to do the same for Cornerstone and its subsequent products. The existing VM proved unsuitable for the database application, so a new one was written for the product. The developers produced the VM for the IBM PC first, planning to write VMs for other platforms after the initial PC release.

== Reception ==
When Cornerstone was released in 1985, it was widely hailed as a giant leap forward in usability. All commands were menu-driven, an innovative feature at the time. Many powerful features never before seen were available, such as command-completion and context-sensitive help. One PC Week columnist wrote, "Cornerstone is the best program I have ever used... the program is so easy to use, explaining its use is almost redundant. If you need a relational database, buy Cornerstone." One significant achievement noted by reviewers was that Infocom was able to contain the entire program on one floppy disk, a bonus provided by their use of their custom virtual machine (in addition to other facilities, it compressed text).

InfoWorld said that Cornerstone was "surprisingly powerful [but] still needs work". Approving of its ease of use, reporting ability, sophisticated relational features, and excellent documentation, the magazine said that such virtues "make Cornerstone's shortcomings all the more disappointing". Confusing menus, "torturously slow" performance, and lack of a dBASE-like programming language—or a text parser like Infocom's games—caused InfoWorld to recommend it "only if you're willing to live with its other limitations".

Infocom's use of a VM affected performance. For simple operations, Cornerstone's performance was fine. However, for intensive operations, such as importing text files and sorting, Cornerstone dragged, especially when compared to the dominant database available at the time of Cornerstone's release, dBase III. One review noted that after waiting over three hours for a single text file to be imported, all similar benchmark tests were abandoned.

Additionally, users of dBase III, despite needing to use complex command-line commands, were able to repurpose databases for whatever uses they needed. They could even make stand-alone applications which used databases with the package. Macros could also be developed which automated many complex or repetitive tasks. Cornerstone, though it had many built-in convenience functions, wasn't programmable. Some repetitive and complex tasks needed to be carried out by hand. Also, any operations on its databases needed to be carried out within the application; Cornerstone had no facilities for creating stand-alone specially purposed applications.

While Infocom's use of a VM was a boon in some ways, the most significant advantage of its use – easy portability – was no longer an issue. During Cornerstone's development, the IBM PC and its clones had emerged as the dominant business computer. While portability was still important for games, a business application could be successful running only on the PC. The product's slow operation due to the VM was too great a disadvantage compared to other current offerings.

These failings may not have proved fatal were it not for the climate in which the product was released. In 1985, the computer industry took a downturn and many businesses that may have been potential customers were reluctant or unable to justify the purchase of the program. Cornerstone sold 10,000 copies. This may not have mattered to the company had game sales remained strong, but the industry downturn also affected Infocom's game sales. Their sales performance was not as good as projected and the revenue provided by games was not enough to cover the development costs of the database. Though the company's revenue for the year was over US$10 million, it was short of what was needed to keep the company solvent.

Additionally, the industry's slump led several of Infocom's creditors to call in their loans early. Infocom's recently burgeoning ranks of employees suffered waves of layoffs and pay reductions.

== Impact on Infocom ==
In 1986, Infocom was acquired by Activision, a large developer and publisher. Activision paid off Infocom's outstanding debt as part of the deal. While the acquisition kept Infocom afloat for a few more years, poor management decisions led Activision to close Infocom in 1989.
