= Digital Game Museum =

- Location: Silicon Valley
- Type: Video Game Museum
- Accreditation: California Association of Museums
- Director: Judith Haemmerle
- Curator: Ben Wilhelm
- Website: www.digitalgamemuseum.org

The Digital Game Museum is a video game museum in California. As stated on their website, the museum focuses on "artifacts relating to digital games, game development, game design, and gaming culture." Some of the displays at the museum showcase information about Atari, Steve Jobs, Xbox, and Sega Genesis.

The museum has corporate sponsors including Elgato, Perforce, KryoFlux, Dashing Strike Games, Mandible Games, and Davis Wright Tremaine LLP.

== Exhibits ==
The museum features permanent online exhibits and temporary physical exhibits.

- The Origin of Brawlers: games from one of the earliest video game genres, also known as Beat-em-ups. Featured games include: Kung-Fu Master, Renegade, Final Fight, River City Ransom, Teenage Mutant Ninja Turtles, Devil May Cry, and Scott Pilgrim vs. the World: The Game
- The Evolution of Console Controllers: broken up into four eras of controllers, The Classic Era, The D-Pad Era, The Analog Era, and The Modern Era. There is also a category for Esoteric and Experimental Controllers.
- Rhythm Games: games with experimental controllers and novel gameplay such as PaRappa the Rapper, Beatmania, Dance Dance Revolution, Vib-Ribbon, Frequency, and Guitar Hero.
- The Rise and Fall of Adventure Games: presented at PAX in 2011.

== Facts ==
- In 2015 at the California Extreme Classic Arcade Expo, the museum debuted a near-complete cartridge of a canceled Atari 2600 version of Xevious that people could play at the convention. Since the project was abandoned in 1984, this cartridge is the only known surviving version of the game for Atari.
