= A Mind Forever Voyaging =

1985 video game

- Developer: Infocom
- Publisher: Infocom
- Designer: Steve Meretzky
- Engine: Z-machine
- Platforms: Amiga, Apple II, Atari ST, Commodore 128, MS-DOS, Mac
- Release: Release 77: August 14, 1985 Release 79: November 22, 1985
- Genres: Adventure, Interactive fiction
- Mode: Single-player

A Mind Forever Voyaging is a 1985 interactive fiction game written and designed by Steve Meretzky and published by Infocom. Set in a future United States in 2031, players assume the role of PRISM, an artificial intelligence tasked to observe the impact of sweeping conservative policies on a simulated South Dakota town over several decades, leading to societal and ecological collapse. Following the success of co-writing another Infocom title, The Hitchhiker's Guide to the Galaxy, Meretzky wrote the game as a narrative-focused and political science fiction title, prompted by his dismay at the 1984 re-election of Ronald Reagan. Whilst the game was not a commercial success upon release, critics praised the writing and scope of Voyaging, considering it ambitious for a text adventure. The game has received a positive retrospective reception and listed as one of the best text adventure titles and games of all time, with some critics viewing its themes as prescient to contemporary political, social and environmental issues.

== Gameplay ==
The start of the game

The initial and overarching goal of A Mind Forever Voyaging is for players to explore the simulated world of Rockvil to observe changes over time and record them. It is played in multiple parts, with the first taking place in Rockvil ten years into the game's future, and progressing in ten-year increments once players have recorded a list of events from each given period. The main game mode, 'Simulation Mode', allows players to navigate around the area by typing the direction they wish to travel, examine and interact with objects and people. The game's parser supports a vocabulary of over 1,800 words.

== Plot ==
In 2031, the United States of North America (USNA) faces severe economic decline, widespread youth suicide through addictive neural-stimulation devices known as Joybooths, and the threat of a new nuclear arms race involving miniature weapons, which risks transforming the country into a police state. Dr. Abraham Perelman has designed PRISM, the world's first sentient computer, which has spent eleven real-world years (equivalent to twenty years subjectively) living in a highly realistic simulation as an ordinary human named Perry Simm, unaware of its artificial nature.

Perelman awakens PRISM from the simulation and reveals its true identity. He explains that PRISM has been enlisted to evaluate a comprehensive political proposal, the Plan for Renewed National Purpose, sponsored by Senator Richard Ryder. The plan emphasizes deregulation of government and industry, compulsory military service, unilateral foreign policy, trade protectionism, and a return to traditional social values. To assess the plan's long-term effects, PRISM enters a series of accelerated simulations centered on the fictional town of Rockvil, South Dakota, projecting societal conditions at intervals following the plan's hypothetical implementation in 2031.

In the first simulation, set in 2041, ten years after adoption, Rockvil appears revitalized. Government operations are more efficient, economic conditions have improved, food supplies are abundant, and residents, including Perry's simulated wife Jill and son Mitchell, express optimism about the future. Initial analysis of PRISM's recordings deems the plan viable, prompting preparations for real-world implementation. Perelman, however, harbors reservations about endorsing such sweeping changes based on limited data. Politically liberal, he distrusts the plan's conservative underpinnings and suggests further testing.

Subsequent simulations reveal progressive deterioration. By 2051, twenty years in, the early gains have faded. Industrial expansion has caused severe pollution, including deforestation and acid rain. The Border Security Force conducts arbitrary raids, capital punishment has expanded, crime rates have risen, imposing curfews, and a new religious movement, the Church of God's Word, gains traction among the disillusioned populace.

Conditions worsen in the 2061 projection. Water pollution approaches catastrophic levels, law enforcement treats citizens brutally, public executions are televised for entertainment, vandalism and cruelty proliferate, and public services collapse. Food shortages emerge, and the Church consolidates power, establishing rigid social hierarchies and recruiting Perry's son Mitchell, who abandons his family.

The 2071 simulation depicts a fully totalitarian regime dominated by the Church, which sanctions slavery among its elite. Mitchell, now a Church official, orchestrates his mother Jill's arrest for heresy. Public torture of animals occurs routinely, food rationing is stringent, and non-Church members face exclusion and violence. Random executions and gladiatorial combats replace earlier forms of punishment, and Perry experiences multiple violent deaths while recording these events.

The final projection, set in 2081, portrays total societal and environmental collapse. Rockvil is a devastated wasteland with crumbling infrastructure, no functional services, and widespread starvation. Survivors face attacks from feral dogs and lawless humans. Perry documents fleeting instances of brutality before succumbing to hunger.

Convinced by the cumulative evidence that the plan would lead to national ruin, Perelman prepares to present PRISM's findings to authorities. He expresses his gratitude, noting that the simulations have averted potential catastrophe for the nation and possibly the world. Senator Ryder, enraged by the plan's prospective rejection, places the facility under lockdown and threatens Perelman. PRISM covertly records the encounter. Shortly thereafter, Ryder's operatives attempt to sabotage PRISM's systems by tampering with the cooling mechanisms. PRISM responds by sealing the area's ventilation, causing the assailants to lose consciousness from accumulated fumes. Once a global news interface becomes available, PRISM broadcasts the recording of Ryder's intimidation, exposing his actions worldwide.

The plan is irrevocably discredited, and Ryder is publicly disgraced. Perelman commends PRISM for its independent initiative in self-defense and evidence dissemination. As recognition for its service, PRISM, reassuming the identity of Perry Simm, is granted permanent residence in a new, idyllic simulation. Set in 2091 under an alternative pacifist framework, this environment reunites Perry with Jill and Mitchell in a prosperous, harmonious society, where he anticipates a serene future.

== Development and release ==
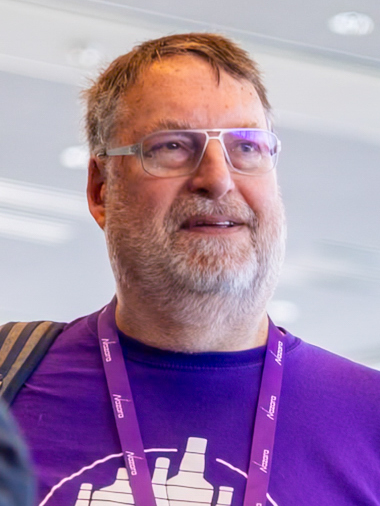
Steve Meretzky, lead designer and writer of A Mind Forever Voyaging.

A Mind Forever Voyaging was written by Steve Meretzky, author of previous text adventure titles for publisher Infocom including Planetfall and co-author of The Hitchhiker's Guide to the Galaxy, the success of which he considered allowed him to develop the game. Meretzky stated a desire to expand the creative and technological potential of the text adventure genre, and wanted to create a political game after being disheartened by the re-election of President of the United States, Ronald Reagan, in 1984, modelling the game's character Richard Ryder after him. Concerned by the rise of the religious right and the impacts of trickle-down economics, Meretzky sought to create a game that could "harness interactive fiction to get inside people's heads and change their minds about political ideas". After being allowed by Infocom to proceed with the concept, despite initial reservations, Meretzky began work on the project by writing a short story of the same name detailing the background of the game's setting, Rockvil, and the life of resident Perry Simm.

Infocom distributed the game as the first in a series of 'Interactive Fiction Plus' titles marketed as featuring longer stories and supported only by computers with over 128k of computer memory. The game's instruction manual was packaged with Dakota Online Magazine, a fictional excerpt of a magazine presented in the universe of the game containing Meretzky's short story. Other additions to the game's physical release included a map of Rockvil, a decoder and pen. Infocom showcased the game at a press release in the New York Public Library in Manhattan, featuring appearances by author Stu Galley, who recited the short story, Infocom President Joel Berez, product manager Michael Donbrook and Meretzky.

Following release of A Mind Forever Voyaging, Meretzky would write Leather Goddesses of Phobos, a space opera with a more light-hearted tone. Meretzky stated he was disappointed with the lack of response to the "politically sensitive" themes of Voyaging, and wrote a game with sexual themes with the intent to generate controversy. He retrospectively considered that A Mind Forever Voyaging was his "largest, most serious, and socially relevant" contribution to the interactive fiction genre. Infocom later distributed the game in various collections, including Science Fiction Classics in 1987, and The Sci-Fi Collection in 1995.

== Reception ==
=== Sales ===
Meretzky stated that the game's sales were "somewhat disappointing" with an estimated 35,000 units sold, falling short of a goal of 50,000. He considered that this was "mediocre" for an Infocom game at the time of release, and attributed its performance to its political content and a lack of puzzles.

=== Critical reviews ===
Reception

Review scores
Publication	Score
Computer and Video Games	9/10
Computer Entertainer	4/5

A Mind Forever Voyaging received positive reviews. Several critics considered the game was ambitious and a departure in style and design for its publisher Infocom, The game also piqued interest from publications about the artistic potential of interactive fiction, with The Providence Journal expressing that the game was "probably the closest anyone has come to creating an electronic novel that is more novel than puzzle", and The Christian Science Monitor considering the game represented "an effort to expand the appeal of these games beyond the enthusiasts who enjoy unravelling riddles and mazes". Both Infocom and critics compared the game to modern science fiction literature, including Fahrenheit 451, Brave New World, and 1984.

Critics praised the game's level of detail and depth, with Amiga World commending the verisimilitude of the city as "amazing" and encouraged "spending a lot of time wandering around in the simulation".Computer & Video Games commended the scale of the game as "enormous" and "vast" in scope and text, writing that the game "gives you the distinct impression [that] your mind can, indeed, voyage forever." Computer Entertainer recommended the game as providing a "riveting" and "believable" concept of the future and highly immersive for fans of science fiction.

Some reviewers critiqued the game's limitations. The Maine Sunday Telegram stated the game was "rich in detail" and "fully developed" in its plot and characters, but considered it experimental and "only partly" successful due to being unexciting. The Tampa Tribune found the game "very difficult" and felt "thwarted" when exploring the world due to the game's vocabulary.

=== Retrospective reception ===
Reception

Review scores
Publication	Score
Adventure Gamers	4/5
AllGame	3.5/5

A Mind Forever Voyaging has received retrospective praise, and has been cited by several publications as one of the best text adventure video games, or one of the best video games of all time. Several artists have cited the game as influential, including Her Story designer Sam Barlow and screenwriter Gary Whitta. Whitta was so impressed by the game as a "fascinating and thought-provoking piece of science fiction" that he attempted in 2002 to create a screenplay for a feature film, although was unable to obtain the rights from Activision.

Critics have also characterised the game's design as innovative for the text adventure genre. Writing in Twisty Little Passages, author Nick Montfort praised the game as a "work of unparalleled power" due to the inventiveness of its narrative which he considered "radically reversed many assumptions of the early text adventure". Listing the game as one of the best of all time, Next Generation praised it as a "triumph" and one of the "few games to attempt something more deep in the interactive entertainment medium than killing or humour".

Some contemporary writers have considered that the political themes of Voyaging were prescient to twenty-first century politics. The Gamer wrote that its predictions of "environmental collapse, pandering war-hungry politicians, nuclear oppositions, the downturn of the economy and the increase of self-harm and depression in the youth" were ominous compared to modern life. Describing the game as "unabashedly political" and "more relevant today", Adventure Gamers expressed the relevance and "strong familiarity" of Senator Ryder's politics as a synthesis of "typical right-wing ideas". The A.V. Club wrote that the game was one of the first "to grapple with the future in any kind of serious way" and depicted a "harrowing" portrayal of the future, although felt its utopian ending was "one of the first truly uplifting endings" in a video game. Meretzky himself considered similarities between the concerns of the game and the politics of the Republican Party President Donald Trump.

=== Accolades ===
A Mind Forever Voyaging was nominated for Best New World at the Software Publishing Association Awards in 1986.
