= Zork: The Undiscovered Underground =

1997 video game

- Developers: Implementors (Marc Blank, Michael Berlyn, Kevin Wilson)
- Publisher: Activision
- Series: Zork
- Platform: Commodore 64
- Release: WW: August 28, 1997
- Genre: Interactive fiction
- Mode: Single-player

Zork: The Undiscovered Underground is an interactive fiction video game written by former Infocom Implementors Marc Blank and Michael Berlyn and implemented by G. Kevin Wilson using the Inform language. The game was commissioned by Activision as a free promotional product to coincide with the release of Zork: Grand Inquisitor. It was released on August 28, 1997.

== Plot ==
Zork: The Undiscovered Underground, a prelude to Zork: Grand Inquisitor, is set in the year 1066 GUE. The game is played from the viewpoint of a private in the Inquisition Guard, tasked with exploring a recently discovered area of the Great Underground Empire. The game merges classic "Zorkian" references such as grues and zorkmids with elements created for the newer games, such as Grand Inquisitor.

== Gameplay ==
The purpose of the game is to explore and emerge successfully from the Undiscovered Underground. The player begins only with a low-quality lantern and plastic imitation sword.

== Development ==
Marc Blank said the intent of the game was to recreate the flavor of the old Zork games and include references that fans of the series would appreciate, while leaving the game accessible to those who had never played a Zork game before. He defended the decision for the game to have no actual plot, arguing, "None of the Zorks had a plot. They had a goal. ... I think at some point, as Infocom went on and on, starting to talk about interactive fiction, I think some sight was lost of the fact that these things are just supposed to be fun. At the end of the day, there can be a story, but what you don't want to do is make the story so heavy-handed or so overwrought, or try so hard to emulate high-brow literature, that you lose track of the reality that people are doing this to have their minds engaged, to laugh now and then, and to think. But this is not somehow intended to replace fiction or to be a great art."
