= Return to Zork =

1993 video game

- Developer: Activision
- Publisher: Infocom
- Producers: Eddie Dombrower; William David Volk
- Designer: Doug Barnett
- Programmer: Joseph T. Chow
- Artists: Joe Asperin; Eric M. Scharf; Charles Workman; Alexander Story
- Writer: Michele Em
- Composers: Nathan Wang; Teri Mason
- Engine: MADE
- Platforms: Mac, MS-DOS, PC-FX, PlayStation, Sega Saturn, FM Towns
- Release: September 15, 1993: Mac, MS-DOS; WW: September 15, 1993 FM Towns; JP: October 29, 1994 PC-FX; JP: May 27, 1995 Sega Saturn; JP: February 2, 1996 PlayStation; JP: September 27, 1996
- Genre: Graphic adventure
- Mode: Single-player

Return to Zork is a 1993 adventure game developed by Activision. The game was the last to be published by Infocom for the Zork series, and was the first to use a point-and-click interface, rather than text-based interaction as in previous games. The game followed the release of Zork Zero in 1988.

The story takes place in the Great Underground Empire, several hundred years after the previous Zork game, and sees players investigating a region that is slowly falling into decay due to a powerful demon-like entity that targets those who oppose it. The game features multiple ways to solve puzzles, as well as a variety of characters portrayed in live-action by recognizable character actors, with the cast including Sam J. Jones, Jason Hervey, and Robyn Lively.

Return to Zork was released in September 1993 for Mac and MS-DOS. The game was ported to FM Towns in 1994, the PC-FX in 1995, and the PlayStation and the Sega Saturn in 1996, all of which were exclusively released in Japan. Plans for the game to be released on 3DO and Atari Jaguar were cancelled.

Return to Zork proved a commercial success, with one million units sold by the end of 1995, stabilizing Activision following its acquisition by a new owner. Upon its release, the game received mixed reviews; critics praised the overall presentation and story, but criticized it for the cast's poor acting while some considered the game an unnecessary installment. The next game in the series, Zork Nemesis, was released in 1996.

== Gameplay ==
Return to Zork focuses on a point-and-click interface with detailed 3D scenes, a replacement for the text parser system used by Infocom in previous Zork games. Players can move around to different locations to explore them from a first-person perspective. Each location has a variety of objects which can be interacted with in different ways - when selected, the game offers a variety of actions for the player to choose from with that object, such as picking it up, pulling it, wearing it, and so forth. Objects that can be carried are kept in an inventory, from which they can be examined, used, or combined with other items. In addition, players carry a camera that can be used to photograph people and locations. Like other Zork games, players may encounter situations where they must avoid performing an action, or have the right items for a situation, otherwise the game will end prematurely, forcing them to reload to a previous point.

Various NPCs, represented through video-captured actors, can be found during the game. They can be conversed with, though conversations are steered by the player using different emotional reactions to the NPC, such as acting aggressive, or making pleas to them, rather than selecting verbal topics like traditional adventure games; the choice of emotional reaction impacts how the NPC will respond, such as making them provide information or grant an item. In addition to emotional responses, players can also show NPCs any photographs and items they have, with conversations with them being recorded on a tape recorder which can be replayed later on when required. Players can kill NPC characters, compared to other Zork games, but such repeated actions are punished by a vigilante character taking all their items, making the game unwinnable.

As with other Zork games, a score system keeps check on the player's progress, rewarding points for completing specific actions.

== Plot ==
=== Setting ===
Return to Zork is set in the fantasy world of Zork, within the year 1647 GUE, at a point where society and technology are similar to or contemporaneous with 20th century Earth, including cameras, sound recorders, lights, computers, and vehicles, though with magic and magical creatures like trolls and dwarves still in existence. Four hundred years before the beginning of the game, in 1247 GUE, Zork experienced an event called the "Great Diffusion", which impacted life, but is now regarded centuries later as less historical and more a myth.

The game's events take place in a region of what was once the Great Underground Empire, known as the Valley of Sparrows, which features a forest, swamp, ruins and mines, and the town of Shanbar.

=== Story ===
The game begins with the player receiving a letter from the mailbox before Zork's iconic "White House", revealing they have won the sweepstakes for an all expenses paid holiday to the Valley of Sparrows, courtesy of Rufus Rooper, owner of a travel company. As part of their prize, the player is gifted a camera, tape recorder, and a magic orb called a "Tele Orb". When Rufus contacts them to congratulate their win, something interrupts the conversation and kidnaps him. When the player proceeds to the Valley of Sparrows, they find it a desolate place falling into ruin and decay, and infested with deadly vultures - the region being ironically renamed "Valley of Vultures". Exploring the area and making for the town of Shanbar, they find half the town is missing, and parts of what left have fallen into ruin.

Locating a magic door beneath the town's mill, the player discovers the other half of Shanbar, known as "East Shanbar", existing in a region of the lost Underground. Conversing with the inhabitants, including fellow Zork explorer Rebecca Snoot, the player learns that Shanbar is under threat from a mysterious being known only as Morphius. Thanks to its presence, vultures emerged in the Valley, Shanbar was separated by powerful magic, and many of the remaining inhabitants suffer frequent and disturbing nightmares, with some becoming reclusive and paranoid. Learning that Morphius must reside somewhere near to East Shanbar behind a spell of illusion, the player works to find and reform a magical artifact that can remove the spell.

Using the artifact, the player gains entry to Morphius's stronghold, overcoming obstacles to finally battle with them, learning that their many friends have been turned into statues. Playing a game they learnt about in East Shanbar, the player defeats Morphius in their match, causing the entity to destroy itself with its own power, an event that goes on to be referred to as "The Second Great Diffusion". As the Valley returns to normal, the player eventually reunites with Rufus, who asks them to teach him the game they learnt on their journey.

== Development ==
In 1991, Activision was undergoing restructuring by its new president Bobby Kotick, following their purchase of the company in 1990. As part of that effort, Kotick sought to capitalize on the company's lucrative back catalog of game licenses. Amongst these, Activision held the license for the Zork series, which Kotick believed could receive a new game, believing by 1996 that "Zork on a brick would sell 100,000 copies". Development focused on modernising the game from its text-adventure phase into a more interactive point-and-click adventure game. The team was led by Doug Barnett, a noted game designer; Michele Em, a game scenario and dialogue scriptwriter; and Mark Long, an art designer (later to go on and become co-founder/owner of Zombie Studios).

Long was chiefly responsible for much of the game's design, believing the final product needed to become "realistic" in presentation alongside modern adventure games, and avoiding a return to concepts like "mazes in text adventure games" - which Long regarded as being "overdone, dull, and annoying" - with puzzles that could have multiple ways of being handled in order to finish the game. In an interview in 1999, Long reasoned that the idea for this was because he "didn't like games that you had to follow a single, specific, obfuscated path for each puzzle, and just one way the game could be finished", stating the concept would provide a player with "reason to play the game more than once, trying to discover new ways to solve puzzles and to finish the game." Much of the game's year-long research relied on examination of various real-life cultures, archeological history and studies to provide cultural references for Return to Zork, aided by Long's military experience overseas with the U.S. Army.

As part of its story, Activision employed several recognizable character actors to portray the characters, each conducting video-recorded FMV sessions in a similar vein to other titles of the mid-1990s, such as Command and Conquer. The cast included a number of well-known younger actors: Robyn Lively of Twin Peaks as "The Fairy", Jason Hervey of The Wonder Years as "The Troll King", Sam J. Jones from the 1980 film Flash Gordon as "The Blind Bowman", and A.J. Langer of My So-Called Life as fellow Zork explorer Rebecca Snoot.

Although finished for release, the game was not properly beta-checked, allowing for some bugs to remain in the game code. A patch was released after launch to fix the bugs, though left a bug within that reduce the number of solutions for completing the game by one.

== Release ==
Roughly half a year before Return to Zork's original release on PC, Activision announced that the game would also be released for the 3DO Interactive Multiplayer. This version was later cancelled. Two months later after release, it was announced that Activision was working on a conversion of Return to Zork for the Atari Jaguar after they were signed by Atari Corporation to be a third-party developer for the system. The port was then announced in video game magazines in 1994 as one of the first upcoming titles for the Atari Jaguar CD add-on. It was kept being advertised as in development on magazines in 1995, however, it was never released.

Two versions of the MS-DOS CD-ROM release were developed; one features full-motion video during gameplay, requiring a RealMagic hardware MPEG decoder; the other, more common version is only capable of playing video during non-interactive cutscenes, and substitutes sequences of static images taken from the video footage during interactive gameplay, however it also features a full orchestral Redbook audio soundtrack at these times, which the RealMagic version cannot use because it constantly streams video from the CD-ROM. Both versions use MIDI music whenever CD audio is unavailable.

Other CD-ROM editions include a "Macintosh MPEG" edition that resembles the RealMagic release, and a 2 CD Japanese edition for PlayStation; an even more reduced version of the game with no video, no Redbook audio, and very limited digital audio, was also released for DOS on a set of twelve 3.5" floppy disks. No released version of the game is capable of playing the orchestral soundtrack and full-motion video simultaneously.

== Reception ==
Reception

Review score
Publication	Score
AllGame	3/5 (MAC)

Return to Zork was made on a budget of $1.5 million, and became a commercial hit. In its first six months, the game achieved global sales of 300,000 units. By September 1994, it had earned $2.4 million and sold 600,000 copies—"more than half from bundled systems", according to Fortune's Stephanie Losee. The game shipped roughly 1 million units by October 1995. According to Jeff Sengstack of NewMedia, its success helped to revitalize Activision, which had recently been purchased by Bobby Kotick.

Charles Ardai of Computer Gaming World wrote in a November 1993 preview of Return to Zork that modernizing the Zork series was "treading on sacred ground. It's a little bit like daring to remake Casablanca". The magazine's Scorpia in January 1994 criticized inconsistencies with previous Zork games and other flaws, but stated that "Considered as a game without the Zork label, however, it's not too bad", citing the "pretty" graphics. She suggested that Activision should have published it as a standalone game instead of "trying to recycle the magic of the past", concluding "A new direction is needed here, and if Activision can find it, they may yet produce adventures worthy of the Infocom label". In April 1994 the magazine said that despite some poor acting, the game's "marvelous visual and sound presentation" and "many plot twists and engaging characters will keep most players engrossed".

Return to Zork was named the best adventure game of 1993 by Computer Games Strategy Plus. It was also a runner-up for Computer Gaming World's 1993 "Adventure Game of the Year" award, which ultimately went to Gabriel Knight: Sins of the Fathers and Day of the Tentacle (tie). The editors wrote that it uses "Hollywood talent and sophisticated techniques to up the ante of production values." In 1994, PC Gamer US named Return to Zork as the 26th best computer game ever. The editors wrote that it "masterfully ... balances the traditions of a classic gaming series with cutting-edge graphics and CD-ROM technology."
