= KryoFlux =

Method to write software to floppy disk

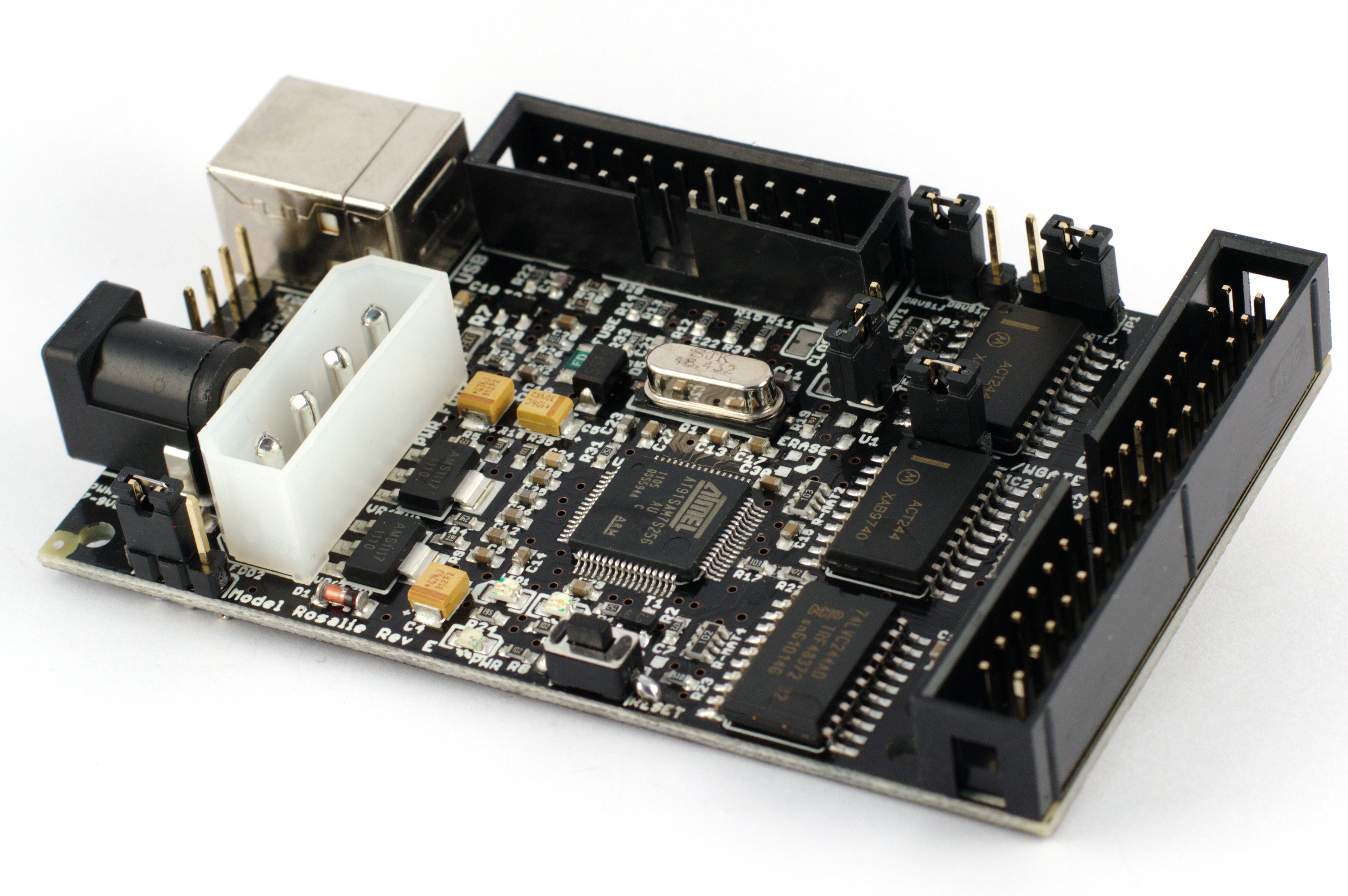
- The KryoFlux controller
- Invented by: Software Preservation Society
- Introduced: November 6, 2009; 17 years ago (as the C2 DiskSystem)
- Connection: USB B to USB A
- Ports: 3.5-inch floppy disk drive interface (adaptable to other sizes)

KryoFlux is a hardware and software solution for preserving software on floppy disks. It was developed by the Software Preservation Society.

== Overview ==
KryoFlux consists of a small hardware device, which is a software-programmable FDC system that runs on small ARM-based devices that connects to a floppy disk drive and a host PC over USB, and software for accessing the device. KryoFlux reads "flux transitions" from floppy disks at a very fine resolution. It can also read disks originally written with different bit cell widths and drive speeds, with a normal fixed-speed drive. The software is available for Microsoft Windows, Mac OS and Linux. The KryoFlux controller plugs into a standard USB port, and allows normal PC floppy disk drives to be plugged into it.

Because the device operates on data bits at the lowest possible level with very precise timing resolution, it allows modern PCs to read, decode and write floppy disks that use practically any data format or method of copy protection to aid in digital preservation. It has been tested successfully with many generations of floppy disk drive including 8", 5.25", 3.5" and 3" mechanisms, and dozens of disk formats including numerous schemes originally designed to prevent software piracy, allowing the preservation (typically to an image file stored on hard disk or other modern media) of programs and data that will inevitably succumb to data degradation as the original physical media deteriorates and becomes unreadable over time. The image files produced may be rewritten to fresh disk media or, more commonly, used with software emulations of the original systems.

When reading old disks (especially those stored in non-climate controlled environments for long periods) there are a number of problems that can arise, including weakening of the magnetic field storing the data, deterioration of the binder holding the metal particles to the plastic disk surface, friction issues preventing the disk rotating freely in its outer protective sleeve, and issues caused by physical misalignment of the drive that originally wrote the disk or the one being used to read it. Users have detailed various techniques to aid in the recovery of data stored on such marginal disks.
