= Trinity (video game) =

1986 video game

- Developer: Infocom
- Publisher: Infocom
- Designer: Brian Moriarty
- Engine: Z-machine
- Platforms: Amiga, Apple II, Atari ST, Commodore 128, MS-DOS, Macintosh
- Release: May 9, 1986
- Genre: Interactive fiction
- Mode: Single-player

Trinity is an interactive fiction video game written by Brian Moriarty and published in 1986 by Infocom. It is widely regarded as one of the company's best works.

The plot blends historical and fantastic elements as part of a prose poem regarding the destructive power of the atomic bomb and the futile nature of war in the atomic age. The name refers to the Trinity test, the first nuclear explosion, which took place in July 1945. It is Infocom's twentieth game and the last game released by the company when it was solvent.

== Plot ==
As the game begins, the player's character is spending a final day of a London vacation in the Kensington Gardens. The evening flight back to the United States is looking increasingly unlikely for a number of unusual reasons. Hordes of nannies are blocking all exits from the Gardens, and the grass actively resists efforts to be walked upon. Worst of all, a gleam on the horizon soon heralds the unwelcome arrival of a Soviet nuclear missile. Time begins to slow as the missile approaches, and with some ingenuity the player's character finds an incongruous door hovering in mid-air. There's no telling where it may lead, but it cannot possibly be worse than the alternative of being at ground zero of a nuclear detonation...

The doorway leads to a strange land, where impossible objects exist. Space and time do not seem to behave in the familiar ways here. Exploring this new environment, the player finds several other mysterious doors, each of which leads to another chapter in the history of nuclear weaponry. After visiting test sites (including ones in Siberia, Nevada, and the Eniwetok Atoll) and Nagasaki just before each device is detonated, the player has one scenario left to deal with. The final door leads to the New Mexico desert on July 16, 1945, mere minutes before the test-firing that will change the course of history. But something is wrong at the "Trinity" site, and without the player's intervention things will go horribly awry.

The player is witness to, or rather narrowly escapes being a witness to, a number of nuclear explosions in the game. The sites visited, and the markings on the sundial that represent them, are:

- London, near future (fictional, Omega)
- Low Earth Orbit, near future (fictional, Mercury)
- Nevada (underground), 1970 (historical, Pluto)
- Eniwetok Atoll, Pacific Ocean, 1952 (historical, Neptune)
- Siberia, 1949 (historical, Libra)
- Nagasaki, Japan, 1945 (historical, Mars)
- Trinity, New Mexico, 1945 (historical, Alpha)

Each of the symbols has a meaning relevant to the incident it represents. Trinity was the site of the first atomic explosion, and is therefore represented by an alpha, which is the first character of the Greek alphabet. The bombing of Nagasaki was an act of war, and Mars is the Roman god of war. The test in Siberia (actually in the Kazakh Soviet Socialist Republic) was an example of another superpower attempting to establish balance in the nuclear arms race, and the zodiacal sign of Libra is represented by the scales, making a reference to restoring the balance. The Eniwetok Atoll test took place in the middle of the ocean; hence it is symbolized by Neptune, the Roman god of the sea. The Nevada test is underground, and thus represented by Pluto, god of the underworld. The fictional incident in London was chronologically the latest to take place, and omega is the last letter of the Greek alphabet. The symbols also appear at the corresponding locations in The Illustrated Story of the Atom Bomb comic, which was included with the game. The fictional Low Earth Orbit (Mercury) detonation is very likely a reference to the space interceptor subproject of the Strategic Defense Initiative, nicknamed "Star Wars", contemporary with the game's development. Trinity also includes numerous references to British children's literature, including the Alice books of Lewis Carroll, the Mary Poppins books of P. L. Travers, and especially J. M. Barrie's novel The Little White Bird.

== Development ==
Brian Moriarty created Trinity's story in 1983. After joining Infocom in 1984 he proposed it to the company, but management believed that it was too large for the z-machine at the time. After completing Wishbringer Moriarty began working on Trinity in May 1985, researching the history of nuclear weapons and visiting the Trinity site and Los Alamos, New Mexico. He attempted to make the game accurately depict the geography of New Mexico and Kensington Gardens. Moriarty completed the game in June 1986, and later stated that "writing it wasn't a pleasant experience, I can tell you that. It's not easy to sit down and write that stuff ... It was hard to live with that game for a year". He added, however, that "Trinity is not a funeral, and [don't] be afraid of it. It's kind of a dark game, but it's also, I like to think, kind of a fun game, too. But I do want people to think about what they see."

== Release ==
The packaging for Trinity contained several items, called feelies, related to the plot of the game. These feelies included:

- A map of the Trinity site
- A cardboard sundial marked with odd symbols
- The Illustrated Story of the Atom Bomb, an "educational" comic book laden with ironic statements regarding the feelings of patriotism, idealism, and jingoism surrounding the production of atomic weaponry
- Instructions on how to fold an origami crane (orizuru) using the Yoshizawa–Randlett system (a reference to Sadako Sasaki), and a small square of origami paper with which to do it.

== Reception ==
In 1996, Next Generation listed Trinity at number 100 in their "Top 100 Games of All Time", commenting that "Trinity takes the same types of serious themes of A Mind Forever Voyaging, and adds to them a heavy dose of mythology and fantasy. ... this is not only one of the most socially and politically powerful game experiences ever created, but also a landscape upon which puzzles of trademark Infocom quality can appear." Later the same year, Computer Gaming World listed Trinity at #120 among their top 150 best games of all time. The editors called it "a tense, ethical tightrope walk through the Cold War".

== Legacy ==
Trinity was included as one of the titles in the 2010 book 1001 Video Games You Must Play Before You Die.

Video game designer and programmer Jonathan Blow mentioned Trinity as one of his formative influences and was a significant inspiration for his game, Braid.
