= Lists of games considered the best =

The following lists provide information about games considered the best for various types of games and criteria:

- List of video games listed among the best
- List of Game of the Year awards (video games)
- List of Game of the Year awards (board games)
