= Hollywood Hijinx =

1986 video game

- Developer: Infocom
- Publisher: Infocom
- Designers: Dave Anderson; Liz Cyr-Jones
- Engine: Z-machine
- Platforms: Amiga, Amstrad CPC, Amstrad PCW, Atari 8-bit, Apple II, Atari ST, Commodore 64, MS-DOS, TRS-80, TI-99/4A, Mac
- Release: 1986
- Genre: Interactive fiction
- Mode: Single-player

Hollywood Hijinx is an interactive fiction video game written by Dave Anderson and Liz Cyr-Jones and published by Infocom in 1986. The game was released for the Apple II, Atari 8-bit computers, Atari ST, Amstrad CPC, Amstrad PCW, Commodore 64, Amiga, TI-99/4A, and MS-DOS. It was Infocom's twenty-third game.

== Plot ==
As the favourite among all of actor-director Buddy Burbank and Hildegarde Montague's nephews and nieces, the player's character stands to inherit the entirety of the Burbank estate, including their palatial home, Hildebud, if the player can find the ten treasures that Aunt Hildegarde has hidden on the grounds.

Hildebud is filled with props, posters, and other memorabilia from Buddy's numerous films: a model of Tokyo with Atomic Chihuahua, the Maltese Finch, and a statue of "Buck Palace, the Fighting Mailman" (star of such films as Postage Due and Special Delivery). There are hidden passages, a convoluted hedge maze, and other bizarre features of the estate. Strange noises suggest someone else is in the house.

== Release ==
Physical items included in the game's packaging were:

1. A copy of Tinsel World, a fictional Hollywood tabloid
2. A swizzle stick in the shape of a palm tree
3. An autographed picture of Uncle Buddy with inscription on the back
4. Aunt Hildegarde's will

== Reception ==
Reception

Award
| Publication | Award |
|---|---|
| Computer and Video Games | C+VG Hit |
