= Planetfall =

1983 video game

- Developer: Infocom
- Publisher: Infocom
- Designer: Steve Meretzky
- Engine: Z-machine
- Platforms: Amiga, Amstrad CPC, Amstrad PCW, Apple II, Apricot PC, Atari 8-bit, Atari ST, Commodore 64, CP/M, Rainbow, Kaypro II, Mac, NEC APC, Osborne 1, MS-DOS, PC-9801, TI-99/4A, TRS-80.
- Release: Release 20: July 8, 1983; Release 26: October 14, 1983; Release 29: January 18, 1984; Release 37: October 3, 1985; Solid Gold: May 31, 1988
- Genre: Interactive fiction
- Mode: Single-player

Planetfall is a science fiction-themed interactive fiction video game written by American videogame developer Steve Meretzky, and published in 1983 as the eighth game from Infocom. The original release was for Apple II, Atari 8-bit computers, TRS-80, and IBM PC compatibles (both as a self-booting disk and for MS-DOS). Atari ST and Commodore 64 versions were released in 1985. A version for CP/M was also released. Planetfall was Meretzky's first published game, and it proved one of his most popular works and a best-seller for Infocom. It was one of five top-selling games to be re-released in Solid Gold versions with in-game hints. Planetfall uses the Z-machine originally developed for Zork and was added as a bonus to the Zork Anthology.

The word planetfall is a portmanteau of planet and landfall, and occasionally used in science fiction to that effect. The book Planetfall written by Arthur Byron Cover, uses the game image on the cover, and is marketed "In the bestselling tradition of The Hitchhiker's Guide to the Galaxy." A sequel, Stationfall, was released in 1987.

== Plot ==
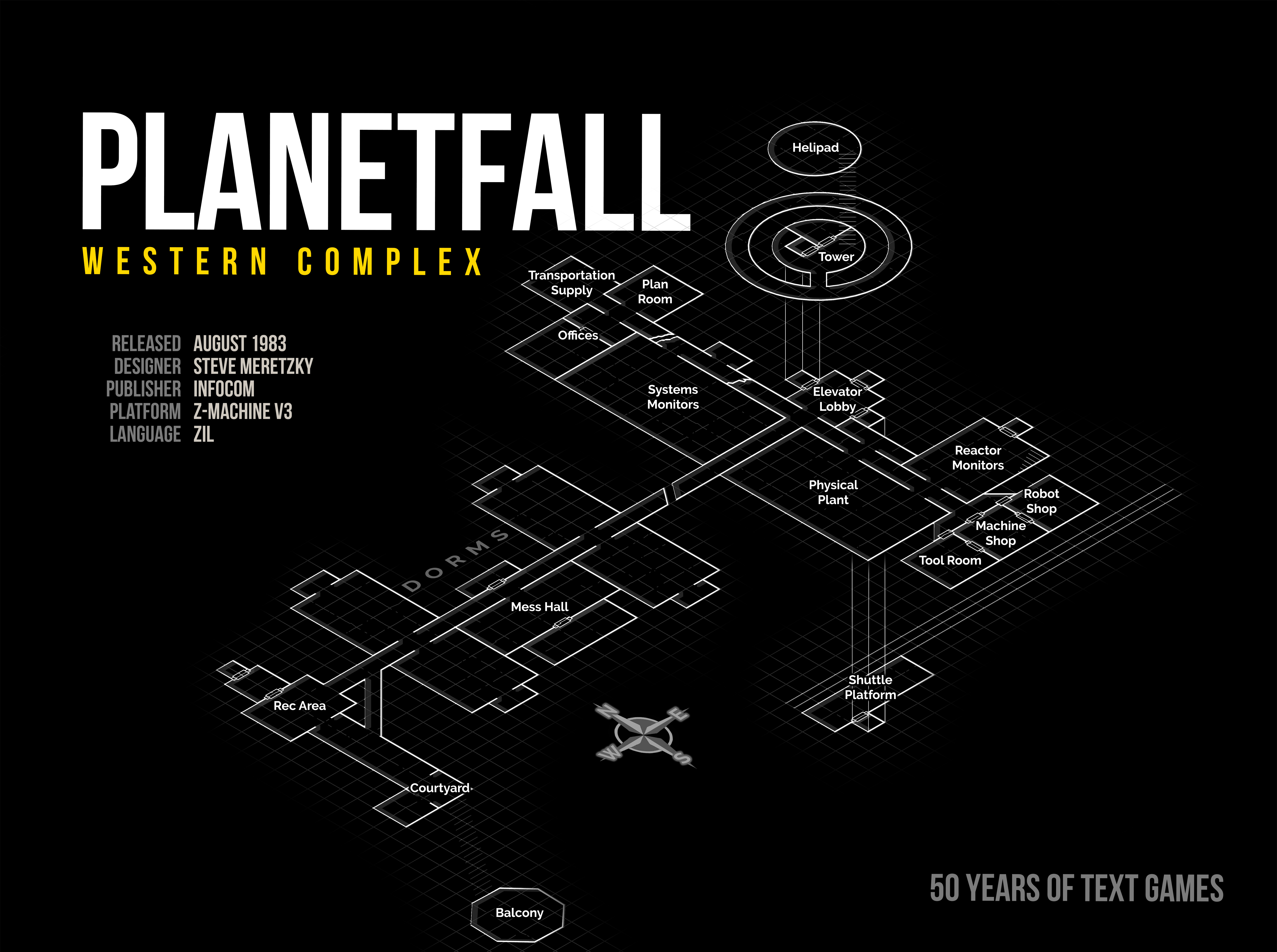
A map of Planetfall world by Aaron A. Reed from 50 Years of Text Games project

The game starts with the user assuming the role of a lowly Ensign Seventh Class on the S.P.S. Feinstein, a starship of the Stellar Patrol. Overbearing superior Ensign First Class Blather assigns the player to mop decks, not exactly the glorious adventures promised by the recruiters on Gallium. In the diary provided in the "feelies", the player is on the verge of deserting ship. But a sudden series of explosions aboard the ship sends the player scrambling for an escape pod, which eventually crash-lands on a nearby planet. There are signs of civilization, but curiously no traces of the beings that once lived there. Eventually encountering a helpful but childlike robot named Floyd, the player must unravel the mysteries of the single deserted structure on the planet, Resida, and find a way to get back home. As the fate of the planet's former inhabitants becomes clearer, a time limit also imposes itself.

The adventurer does not remain on S.P.S. Feinstein for long. Talking to the alien ambassador and performing the assigned task of scrubbing the floor don't accomplish much. Wandering to other parts of the ship merits demerits from Blather and an ultimately fatal run-in with the Brig unless the player returns to work. Soon, an explosion occurs and an escape pod door opens. The pod safety netting breaks the player's fall and an escape kit is produced, which proves critical to survival. With great exertion, the adventurer swims out of the pod and climbs up to a mysterious deserted base.

By putting together various clues, slowly the player realizes that the nearly uninhabited island is in fact one of the last remaining landmasses on a planet on the verge of destruction. A deadly plague for which no cure existed threatened to kill off all inhabitants of the world. The inhabitants initiated a planetwide project to place everyone under suspended animation while automated systems of robots and computers worked towards finding a cure. Once the cure was found, the inhabitants could be revived.

By the time the player arrives, it is clear that the project is on the edge of success, but the planet itself is on the verge of destruction. The planetary orbit has decayed, leading to massive global warming and an enormous rise in the oceanic levels. Meteorites bombard the planet with ferocious intensity, and the project to find a cure for the plague is itself threatened by the failure of the main computer and repair systems. Adding to the challenge is the fact that some of the puzzles are not solvable. Determining which ones are impossible and avoiding even trying is essential.

Early on in the game, the player finds what at first appears to be the only remaining inhabitant of the island: Floyd, a childish yet endearing robot. He is both a constant source of comic relief (e.g. "Oh, boy! Are we going to try something dangerous?" when the player saves the game in his presence), and also critical in advancing the plotline. Once Floyd realizes that the ProjCon repair robot (aptly named Achilles) is non-functional, and that the Project is close to completion, he performs the ultimate sacrifice and gives his life to retrieve the vital Miniaturization Card from the Bio-lab (the mutants within kill the player if he tries to get it himself). As Floyd lies dying, the player sings the "Ballad of the Starcrossed Miner" to him (itself an allusion to the earlier Infocom game Starcross).

The adventurer then uses the Miniaturization Booth to access malfunctioning Relay Station #384 and repairs the main computer by removing an offending speck of dust with a laser. After defeating a giant microbe, the adventurer is informed that the primary Miniaturization Booth is malfunctioning and is rerouted to the Auxiliary Booth. Unfortunately, this puts a room full of mutants between the player and the endgame.

With a biomask and the help of the Laboratory's poison gas system, the player makes it through the Bio-lab but emerges with the mutants on his tail. However, the adventurer makes it to the Cryo-Elevator which is hidden behind a mural. The elevator takes the adventurer to a secret room where the survivors of the infection were cryogenically frozen, just as the entire facility staff is reanimated by the antidote discovered by the ProjCon Computer. The adventurer is proclaimed a hero, Floyd is repaired, and Blather is demoted.

There are 41 ways to die. The adventurer must sleep in a Dormitory each night and eat when hungry. Taking more than a few days causes the adventurer to succumb to the infection which apparently has ravaged the facility unless the antidote is obtained at the underground site. But even taking the antidote only buys a little time as the planet is nearing its sun. To achieve the optimum ending, the adventurer also must repair the three Planetary systems: the Communications System, the Planetary Defense System, and the Course Control System.

== Release ==
The game included the following physical items:

1. A Stellar Patrol "Special Assignment Task Force" ID card (about the size and shape of a credit card). The ID number printed on the card is the telephone number of MIT's student newspaper, The Tech, which was in the way of a prank by Meretzky.
2. Three interstellar postcards
3. A Stellar Patrol recruiting manual, "Today's Stellar Patrol: Boldly Going Where Angels Fear to Tread"
4. A short diary kept by the player's character (in the Solid Gold release, an in-game object included in the player's starting inventory rather than the packaging)

== Reception ==
Softline stated that "the puzzles are good; the character of Floyd is great". The magazine stated that the "game is excellent", but criticized the ending as "unabashed adolescent wish fulfillment ... more like a fairy tale". In 1984 the magazine's readers named the game the tenth most-popular Apple program of 1983. Computer Gaming World called Floyd's role as sidekick "unique" and hoped that future games would add such innovations. It stated that Planetfall was "another excellent adventure" for text-adventure fans, and a good place to start for those new to interactive fiction. Creative Computing wrote that Planetfall "is as remarkable, funny, perplexing, and entertaining a game as you are likely to find anywhere." It praised Floyd as "the most imaginative and cleverly written part of the entire game, Floyd, besides being hysterically funny through most of the adventure, evokes in the player of Planetfall authentic feelings of affection and attachment". InfoWorld's Essential Guide to Atari Computers recommended the game as among the best adventures for the Atari 8-bit.

Steve Meretzky stated that Floyd "was the result of research into how an artificially intelligent mind might work". The Boston Globe in 1984 described the robot as "the most popular Infocom character". Planetfall has been described as "still lovingly remembered", and parts have been described as "transcendent", including Floyd's death. Meretzky claims that "numerous players" have told him that they cried over the death of Floyd. Softline wrote, "You don't feel like this very often. Maybe after you've read Charlotte's Web. Maybe when they shot Bambi's mother. Maybe when Raskolnikov got religion in the Siberian slave labor camp. But this scene is from a computer game. A game!" A game developers round table on GEnie concluded that Floyd's death was a sad moment that could make someone cry. Floyd's death has been described as directly evoking the player's emotions because the story and gameplay are aligned. The death of Floyd has been described as changing the game to an "evocative theatrical experience" after which "the player feels lonely and bereaved." The memory of Floyd's death remains with players for years and is remembered as a direct experience. Floyd's death "convey[ed] a sense of wonder at the unexpected and touching quality of the gesture." The scene has been described as a minor milestone toward computer games as an expressive narrative art. Game designer Raph Koster feels that Floyd's death is "cheating" because it occurs in a cut scene.

== Legacy ==
In February 1992, a remake of Planetfall (プラネットフォール, Puranettofōru) was developed and published by Japanese software development company SystemSoft for the NEC PC-9801, over eight-and-a-half years after the original Planetfall. There are differences in this enhanced remake: the game recognizes verb commands typed in kana (Japanese syllable system) or Latin alphabet. For convenience, some of the most common verb commands (Look, Take, etc.) can be accessed by pressing a corresponding button, but the player still has to type the name of an object. This remake also helps the player to interact with the environment by displaying a list of objects after the player has typed a command. Also, unlike the original, the remake contains enhanced graphics; every location has a unique background picture, on which the text is super-imposed, like in the PC-9801 version of Zork I and Enchanter.

== See also ==
- Space Quest, adventure game series also starring a janitor

== Sources ==
- Murray, Janet H. (1998-08-27). Hamlet on the Holodeck: The Future of Narrative in Cyberspace. MIT Press. pp. 52–53. ISBN 978-0262631877.
