= Beyond Zork =

1987 video game

- Developer: Infocom
- Publisher: Infocom
- Designer: Brian Moriarty
- Engine: Z-code version 5
- Platforms: Amiga, Apple II, Apple IIGS, Atari ST, Commodore 128, MS-DOS, Mac
- Release: Release 47: September 15, 1987 Release 49: September 17, 1987 Release 51: September 23, 1987 Release 57: December 21, 1987
- Genre: Interactive fiction
- Mode: Single player

Beyond Zork: The Coconut of Quendor is an interactive fiction video game released by Infocom in 1987. Nominally a successor to the Zork trilogy of text adventures, it was a notable departure from the standard format of Infocom's earlier games which relied purely on text and puzzle-solving.

== Description ==
Beyond Zork is a hybrid adventure, retaining the story structure, user interface and parser of a text adventure, while utilizing primitive graphics, the use of character statistics and levels, and RPG combat elements. Other improved functions include the ability Undo an action, and the simultaneous creation of a map via auto-mapping. However, when the player reboots the game after a character death, the locations of rooms and encounters are all randomly redistributed. Game creator Michael Moriarty felt that that in previous games, after a reboot, the player already knew what challenges and treasures were to be found in locations previously visited. Moriarty felt that a new challenge was needed, hence the addition of the map redistribution following a character death.

== Plot ==
The player explores the Southlands of Quendor somewhat aimlessly at first. Soon, however, a task is bestowed by the Implementors: to retrieve The Coconut of Quendor, a mighty artifact that embodies the whole of Magic. It has fallen into the claws of an unspeakably foul beast: an Ur-grue. Rumored to be the spirits of fallen Implementors, Ur-Grues can surround themselves in a sphere of darkness that only sunlight can pierce. The player must recover the Coconut from this monster's grasp or face the unthinkable consequences.

=== Ur-grue ===
Beyond Zork introduces the "Ur-grue", a being which game materials describe as the progenitor and ruler of the monstrous race of grues—the term "Ur-grue" combines the German prefix ur- signifying "original" and "grue"—as well as the source of many other evil monsters. He is said to have originated as the shade of a "fallen Implementor".

The Ur-grue is revealed to be the primary villain of the story. The player, sent to retrieve the Coconut of Quendor from the Implementors, arrives at the Implementors' Luncheon on the Ethereal Plane of Atrii only to find he has been followed by the Ur-grue in shadow form, who takes the opportunity to steal it for himself. The player must then venture into the Ur-grue's extensive underground lair and retrieve it.

The Ur-grue is shown to be a dungeon master of sorts, controlling huge parts of the Zork underground and having accumulated an enormous hoard of treasure, of which the Coconut is his crowning acquisition. He has not only an army of grues at his disposal but also bizarre creatures of evil such as Lucksuckers, spirits who attack the player by draining his good fortune (reducing his Luck stat). The Ur-grue himself is surrounded by a pool of magical darkness that is capable of overcoming and destroying all artificial light sources, and is therefore only vulnerable to pure sunlight—the player, therefore, can only best him by using a series of mirrors to transmit a beam of light at him from outside the dungeon.

After doing so, the Ur-grue's shadowy form is dissipated revealing what may be his true form, that of a broken, withered old man. It is implied that the Ur-grue cannot survive long in this form and must possess others' bodies, like a demon, in order to survive—he attempts to possess the player. If he succeeds, a negative ending is revealed where the possessed player-character finds and strangles baby grues until he finds one strong enough to hold the Ur-grue's essence, implying that the Ur-grue's usual shadowy form is an enhanced version of a grue's body.

If the player's Compassion stat is high enough—represented by having done enough good deeds throughout the game—the Ur-grue is shown to be unable to possess the player, his evil apparently unable to coexist in the same body with an extremely pure or virtuous spirit, and the Ur-grue's old man form fades away. Whether this means the Ur-grue was permanently destroyed in this encounter is unclear, as is the possibility of others of his kind existing somewhere in the world, although, being magical in nature, it seems unlikely any Ur-grues could survive in Quendor following the Great Change.

== Feelies ==
Almost since the company's beginning, Infocom's games included "extras" (called feelies) in the packages, often serving a dual purpose of entertainment and copy protection. Beyond Zork is no exception. The game package contained:

- A large fold-out map of the "Southland of Quendor"
- A small book titled The Lore and Legends of Quendor, a field guide of sorts to the flora and fauna of the area (several entries contained the information necessary to defeat or incapacitate creatures in the game)

== Publication history ==
Beyond Zork was written by Brian Moriarty and published by Infocom in 1987, at that time a subsidiary of Activision. It was one of the last games in the Zork series developed by Infocom — titles such as Zork Nemesis and Zork: Grand Inquisitor were created after Activision had dissolved Infocom as a company and kept the Infocom brand name).

The game, Infocom's twenty-ninth, was coded in ZCODE, and was available on the Amiga, Apple II, Atari ST, Commodore 128, IBM PC compatibles, and Macintosh.

In 1991, Beyond Zork was one of 20 Infocom games bundled in the compilation The Lost Treasures of Infocom published by Activision.

== Reception ==
Reception

Award
| Publication | Award |
|---|---|
| Computer and Video Games | C+VG Hit |

Scorpia, writing in Computer Gaming World, was pleased with some of Beyond Zork's features, particularly the ability to define macros and bind them to the function keys. But she found the randomness of the game frustrating, particularly when the maps and item properties randomize upon restoring a previous game save. Scorpia concluded that the game was "a curious hybrid... mostly tough Infocom adventure with a patina of role-playing elements." In 1993, five years after the game's release, Scorpia commented "merging of CRPG with adventure does not mix as well as it should".

In Issue 132 of Dragon, Hartley, Patricia, and Kirk Lesser commented, "Not only are the puzzles tough, but you will find that as you reenter the game (after a character's demise), items previously identified and rooms previously mapped have now changed." They also warned, "This offering is going to require a great deal of skill and concentration to complete. There are staves, wands, sticks, six kinds of potions, and a variety of unique creatures ... that do their best to ensure bewilderment (and possibly death). Running away from a hostile confrontation is usually a worthwhile alternative." The Lessers concluded by giving the game a perfect rating of five stars, saying, "If you have never played an Infocom game, Beyond Zork should whet your appetite for even more. For experienced Infocom gamers, this offering is so different from previous adventures that it must be in your game library."

Writing for Compute!, James Trunzo stated that the game's combination of text adventure and RPG "introduces the next stage in interactive fiction". Trunzo concluded, "Beyond Zork reaffirms Infocom's position as king of the text adventures".

In Antic, Harvey Bernstein commented "this hack-and-slash approach is not what we have come to expect from Infocom". While approving of the new Undo function and other user interface improvements, Bernstein disliked the loss of "exactly what Infocom writers do best — lots of descriptive text with a loving eye for detail that adds a sense of realism to good adventures". Bernstein concluded, "if adding these bells and whistles cuts into the heart of your product, is the trade-off worth it?"

In Issue 13 of Gateways, Charles and Sydney Barouch noted "What separates this game [from previous Zork games] is a bloodthirstiness that we'd never thought we'd see from this cerebral company. Unlike the puzzles of the Zork or Enchanter trilogies, this game is designed to kill you off." They further explained, "Beyond Zork is a pattern game in the worst sense. It requires you to play and replay until you learn what the software expects you to do. All games have some elements of patterning, but Beyond Zork carries this beyond reason." The Barouches concluded, "We wanted to like this game. We love most of the Infocom games that we've reviewed or played for personal enjoyment. It is quite possible that many of you will enjoy it. There is nothing wrong with the game, per se — it just isn't part of the Zork family."

In the 1988 Macworld Game Hall of Fame, Stephen Levy named Beyond Zork the runner-up (alongside Police Quest) to The Colony as Best Adventure Game. Levy called the game "a triumphant return by the Infocom adventure series to its dungeon roots, with myriad improvements on the original."
