= Marc Blank =

American game developer

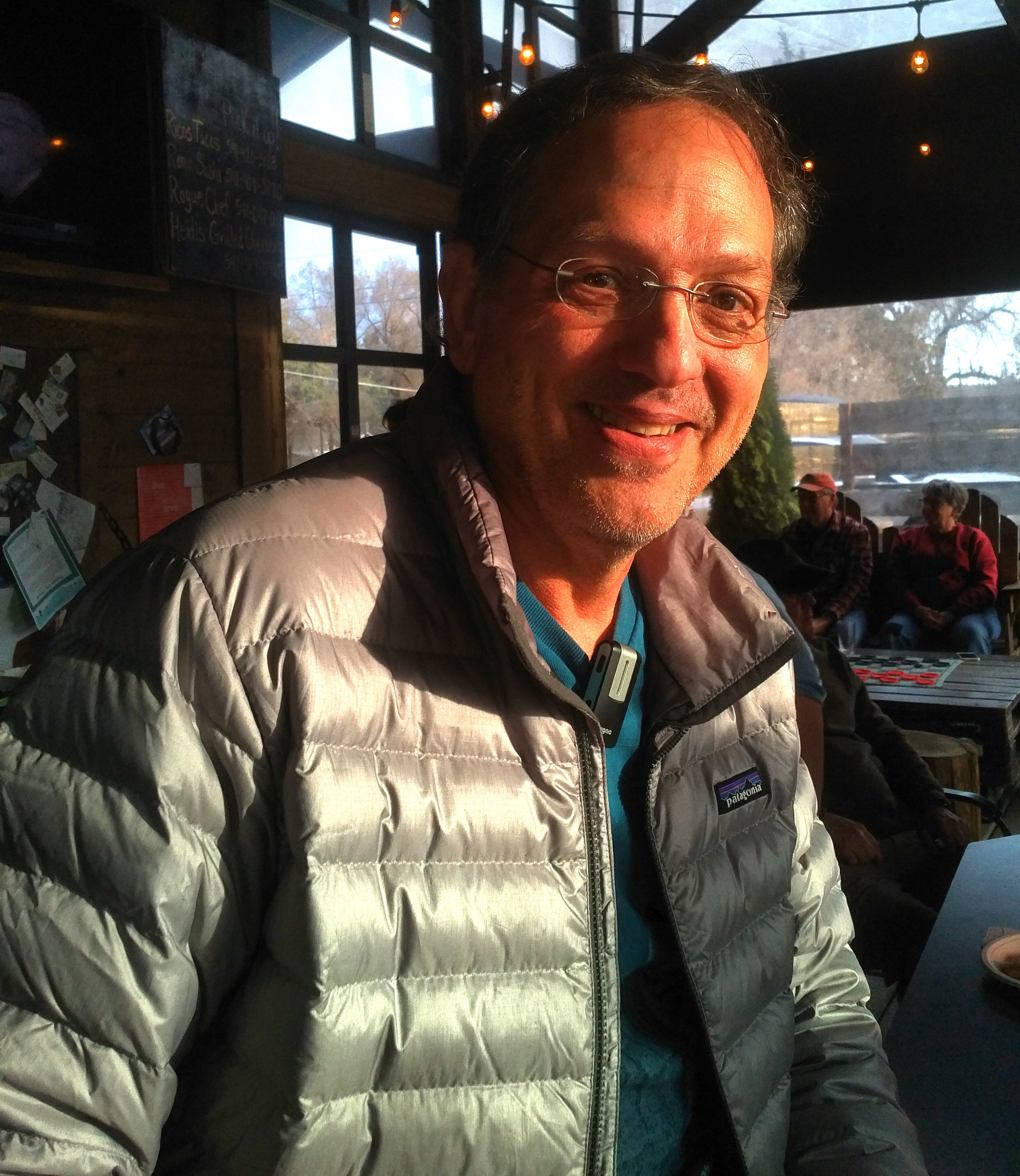
- Blank in 2018
- Education: Massachusetts Institute of Technology; Albert Einstein College of Medicine (MD)
- Occupations: Video game developer, software engineer

Marc Blank is an American game developer and software engineer. He is best known as part of the team that created one of the first commercially successful text adventure computer games, Zork. In 2009, he was chosen by IGN as one of the top 100 game creators of all time.

== Career ==
Blank first encountered Don Woods and Will Crowther's Adventure game while he was studying at the Massachusetts Institute of Technology in the mid-1970s, where the game was played on mainframe computers.

Blank was frustrated by the computer's tiny vocabulary; when it parsed user inputs very few words were recognized. After thinking about the problem during his undergraduate years, he started work on his own adventure game using MDL, a computer language invented at MIT. Blank and a handful of friends wrote the original version of Zork on a PDP-10 while he was attending medical school at Albert Einstein College of Medicine in New York City (he received his MD degree in 1979).

Blank graduated from medical school in 1979 but elected to continue with Zork. He and several friends spent the next year developing a specialized computer language that they could use to program text adventures like Zork on then-new microcomputers (with far less capabilities than the PDP-10). They founded the new company, Infocom, to publish the game and more like it. Aside from Zork I, II, and III, he designed Deadline, Enchanter, Fooblitzky, Border Zone, and Journey: The Quest Begins

In 1993 he founded Blank, Berlyn and Co. with former Infocom writer Michael Berlyn. The company's name was later changed to Eidetic after former Apple Employee [Russ Wetmore] joined as the third partner, to help program Notion, for the Apple Newton. Eidetic initially published productivity software for the Apple Newton. Eidetic's Notion: The Newton List Manager became a hit and was ultimately bundled in all Newtons.

Blank returned to text adventures in 1997 when Activision producer Eddie Dombrower asked Blank and Berlyn to create a small promotional game, Zork: The Undiscovered Underground, to promote the release of Activision's graphical game Zork: Grand Inquisitor.

As Newton sales slowed, Eidetic changed gears to focus on PC and PlayStation games, producing Bubsy 3D in 1996 and Syphon Filter in 1999. In 2000 Sony acquired Eidetic for an undisclosed sum.

Blank left Sony in 2004, where he focused on his email client for the Treo smartphone, ChatterEmail. On February 22, 2007, Blank announced he would no longer be "actively" working on ChatterEmail. Blank subsequently joined Palm, Inc. (who acquired ChatterEmail) and led the design and implementation of the Palm Pre's Email application. He worked in the Android group at Google from 2010 to 2012, and as a Principal Engineer at Lab126 (Amazon.com) from 2012 to 2018.

In 2013 Blank and Dave Lebling were awarded the Academy of Interactive Arts & Sciences Pioneer Award for their work on Zork.
