= The Hitchhiker's Guide to the Galaxy (video game) =

- Developer: Infocom
- Publisher: Infocom
- Designers: Douglas Adams; Steve Meretzky
- Engine: Z-machine
- Platforms: Amiga, Amstrad CPC, Amstrad PCW, Apple II, Apricot PC, Atari 8-bit, Atari ST, Commodore 64, CP/M, MS-DOS, Epson QX-10, Kaypro II, Mac, Osborne 1, TI-99/4A, TRS-80, Flash, DEC Rainbow, HP 100 and 150
- Release: NA: November 1984; EU: 3 January 1985
- Genres: Adventure, Interactive fiction
- Mode: Single-player

The Hitchhiker's Guide to the Galaxy is an interactive fiction video game based on the comedic science fiction series of the same name. It was designed by series creator Douglas Adams and Infocom's Steve Meretzky, and it was first released in 1984 for the Apple II, Mac, Commodore 64, CP/M, MS-DOS, Amiga, Atari 8-bit computers, and Atari ST. It is Infocom's fourteenth game.

== Plot ==
The game loosely mirrors a portion of the series' plot, representing most of the events in the first book. Arthur Dent wakes up one day to find his house about to be destroyed by a construction crew to make way for a new bypass. His friend Ford Prefect, who is secretly an extraterrestrial, helps to calm Arthur down and hitches them a ride on one of the ships in the approaching Vogon constructor fleet, moments before the fleet destroys the Earth to make way for a new hyperspace bypass.

Aboard the ship, Arthur learns that Ford is a journalist for The Hitchhiker's Guide to the Galaxy and has been on Earth researching the planet for the Guide. The two are discovered by Vogons and subjected by the captain to a reading of his poetry. The two manage to survive this, and the Vogons throw them into the airlock and shoot them out into space. By a huge improbability, they are picked up in the last moment before they die of asphyxiation by the spacecraft Heart of Gold while it is traveling on Infinite Improbability Drive. After getting safely aboard the ship, Arthur and Ford meet Ford's friend Zaphod Beeblebrox, who had stolen the Heart of Gold as his first act of office as the Galactic President, as well as Arthur's friend Trillian (Tricia McMillan), whom Zaphod had picked up from a party on Earth. Zaphod wants to travel to the legendary planet of Magrathea, believing it to hold a great secret.

At this point, Zaphod leaves the task of getting to Magrathea to the ship's computer Eddie, and he, Ford, and Trillian depart to the ship's sauna. Arthur finds Eddie incapable of getting to Magrathea without help. Arthur initially tries to help by supplying the Infinite Improbability Drive with a tea substitute from the ship's Nutrimatic device to serve as a source of Brownian motion, but this only causes Arthur to temporarily take on the consciousness of Ford, Zaphod, and Trillian in their respective pasts, and he must manipulate events such that items in these past periods are brought aboard the Heart of Gold in the present. Through this, Arthur gains enough parts as to replace the circuit board in the Nutrimatic so that it can produce real tea. This tea is powerful enough to power the Drive to get them to Magrathea, but in orbit, the ship is attacked by two missiles from the surface. Arthur employs the Drive again to change the missiles into a sperm whale and a bowl of petunias, neutralizing the threat.

The ship prepares to land, but the computer will not let them do so. Again, the other three head off to the sauna, leaving Arthur to figure out how to fix this. This requires Arthur to reach Marvin the Paranoid Android's closet on the ship in order to get the final tools needed to fix the computer and get it to land. The game ends as Arthur and the others are about to set foot on Magrathea.

== Gameplay ==
Screenshot of the 30th anniversary edition of the game. The original text-based game is effectively presented in the top-left window, and additional graphical interface elements added for the anniversary edition.

The Hitchhiker's Guide is a text adventure game in which the player, in the role of Arthur Dent, solves a number of puzzles to complete various objectives to win the game. This includes collecting and using a number of inventory items. The player has a limited variety of commands to observe, move about, and interact with the game's world, such as "look", "inventory", "north" (to move north), "take screwdriver", or "put robe on hook". Most commands will advance the game's turn counter, and some puzzles require the player to complete it within a fixed number of turns or else the game may end and require the player to restart at the beginning or a saved state; passive commands like "look" and "inventory", or mistyped or non-comprehended commands, do not count as turns. Once the player has acquired the eponymous Hitchhiker's Guide to the Galaxy, a wide variety of topics can be asked about, some of which may be helpful in solving the game's puzzles.

In both the game's 20th- and 30th-anniversary editions, the game's interface is augmented with graphics that help to map out the locations and other features, though the player is still required to type in all commands.

== Feelies ==
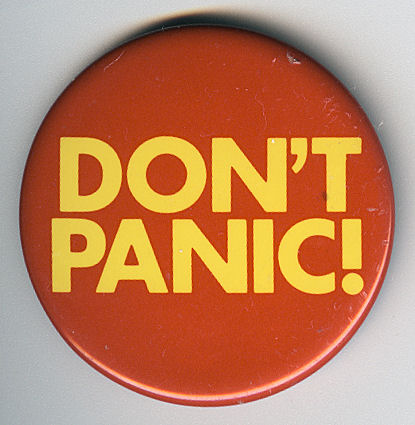
The "Don't Panic" feelie button.

Most Infocom games contained "feelies", bonus novelty items included to enhance the immersiveness of the game. The feelies provided with this game included:

- A pin-on button with "Don't Panic!" printed in large, friendly letters
- A small plastic packet containing "pocket fluff" (a cottonball)
- Order for destruction of Arthur Dent's house
- Order for destruction of Earth written in "Vogon" (actually an English cryptogram written in a thinly-disguised Greek alphabet. The text was nearly identical to that of the English Order for Destruction)
- Official Microscopic Space Fleet (an empty plastic bag)
- "Peril Sensitive Sunglasses" (a pair of opaque black cardboard "sunglasses")
- How Many Times Has This Happened to You?, an advertising brochure for the fictional guidebook/encyclopedia The Hitchhiker's Guide to the Galaxy
- "No tea: Just like the tea professional hitchhikers don't carry!" (in fact, nothing)

== Reception ==
The Hitchhiker's Guide to the Galaxy gained a reputation for deviousness. Computer Gaming World reported on rumors that "several important people within the [video game] industry cannot (snicker, snicker!!!) even get out of [the] first room!" Jerry Pournelle advised non-readers of the novel against playing the game, and warned that "even if you've memorized the book, these puzzles are hard". Perhaps the most notorious instance involved getting a Babel Fish out of a dispenser in the hold of the Vogon ship, which would translate the Vogon language to English. This tricky puzzle appeared early in the game and required the player to use a variety of obscure items in a specific fashion, some which had to be obtained in earlier, but non-revisitable, sections of the game, to create a Heath Robinson (or Rube Goldberg)-like chain of events. The puzzle further had to be "solved" within a limited number of turns. Failure to "solve" the Babel Fish puzzle did not kill the player, but rendered the remainder of the game unwinnable, as one subsequent puzzle requires the player to gain a passcode based on Vogon-written instructions, otherwise undecipherable without the Fish. That particular puzzle became so notorious for its difficulty that Infocom wound up selling T-shirts bearing the legend, "I got the Babel Fish!" Adams stated that the puzzle's difficulty, and the notable game play change that it begins, was intentional; "Just as the player gets comfortable in the narrow neck, the bottom drops out!"

The Hitchhiker's Guide to the Galaxy was very successful. It sold 59,000 copies in 1984—in second place among Infocom games, after Zork I—and with 166,000 copies it was the company's best-selling title in 1985, more than twice as many as Wishbringer. Based on sales and market-share data, Video magazine listed the game fourth on its list of best selling video games in February 1985, and third on the best seller list in March 1985, with II Computing listing it sixth on the magazine's list of top Apple II games as of October–November 1985. Its sales had surpassed 250,000 copies by November 1989. Hitchhiker ultimately sold 400,000 copies, and was one of the best-selling titles of its time.

Video in March 1985 praised the game's fidelity to its source material, stating that "it survives the transition as wacky and spaced-out as ever". Though acknowledging that "there may be a few minor problems with The Hitchhiker's Guide to the Galaxy", the reviewer suggested that "the game is so engrossing, funny, and often so infuriatingly difficult that you'll hardly notice them". In May 1985 Antic called it an "extraordinary game" and "a step forward from Infocom's safe, established approach to game design" with "distinct and tangible" writing, "really the first stylistic departure since the Zork trilogy". The magazine stated that Hitchhiker was "not your run-of-the-mill text adventure" but promised that "the puzzles are tough, but follow a certain capricious, twisted internal logic". Compute! in June 1985 stated that the game "may well be Infocom's best effort to date", citing an effective adaptation of Adams's "comic absurdity", sense of humor, and "fascinating" story. The magazine "recommended [it] for all adventure gamers", and listed the game in May 1988 as one of "Our Favorite Games", stating that its humor distinguished Hitchhiker from other adventure games; "[Adams'] keen and literate wit make this game a joy". Compute! gave it the 1989 Compute! Choice Award for Role Playing/Adventure Game.

In 1996, Computer Gaming World listed The Hitchhiker's Guide to the Galaxy at #42 among their top 150 best games of all-time, writing that "Douglas Adams' humor comes alive in this text adventure".

== Legacy ==
The Hitchhiker's Guide to the Galaxy was one of five top-selling Infocom games to be produced in Solid Gold versions, with a built-in hint system not included in the originals. The game was re-released by Activision in several collection packages before rights reverted to Adams, enabling The Digital Village to re-release it as a web-based Java applet. Originally published as a fund-raising tool on the 1997 Comic Relief website, it took up permanent residence on Adams' own website the following year.

The original text-only version appeared in the Game On video games exhibition, which has toured museums worldwide since 2002, representing the text-based genre of video games.

On 21 September 2004 the BBC launched the 20th Anniversary Edition to coincide with the initial radio broadcast of the Tertiary Phase. Sporting a Flash user interface, and illustrated by Rod Lord (who also produced the guide animations for the Hitchhiker's TV series), it won the Interactive BAFTA Award for Best Online Entertainment.

In 2014, a 30th Anniversary Edition was made available at the BBC.

=== Sequel ===
A proposed sequel, Milliways: The Restaurant at the End of the Universe, which was to continue from the ending of the original, had problems from the start of development in 1985, until it was cancelled in 1989. This was due primarily down to the facts that there was "no solid game design, nobody to program it, and the backdrop of Infocom's larger economic problems". The beginning stages of the game were leaked in April 2008; however, the majority of it had yet to be written by the time it was cancelled.
