= Enchanter (video game) =

1983 video game

- Developer: Infocom
- Publisher: Infocom
- Designers: Marc Blank; Dave Lebling
- Engine: Z-machine
- Platforms: Amiga, Amstrad CPC, Amstrad PCW, Apple II, Apricot PC, Atari 8-bit, Atari ST, Commodore 64, CP/M, DEC Rainbow, Kaypro II, Macintosh, NEC APC, Osborne 1, MS-DOS, PC-9801, PDP-9, PDP-10, PDP-11, TI-99/4A, TRS-80.
- Release: August 10, 1983
- Genre: Interactive fiction
- Mode: Single-player

Enchanter is an interactive fiction game written by Marc Blank and Dave Lebling and published by Infocom in 1983. The first fantasy game published by Infocom after the Zork trilogy, it was originally intended to be Zork IV. The game has a parser that understands over 700 words, making it the most advanced interactive fiction game of its time. It was Infocom's ninth game.

The game was followed by a 1984 sequel, Sorcerer.

== Plot ==
Krill, a powerful evil warlock, is spreading chaos and destruction. None of the more experienced members of the Circle of Enchanters dare to attempt to stop him. In desperation, the player, a novice Enchanter with only a few weak spells in his spell book, is sent in hopes that Krill will either fail to detect him or dismiss him as harmless. More powerful spells can be found on scrolls hidden in various locations, but as the player becomes more of a threat, Krill will respond accordingly.

== Gameplay ==
This game has a new spell system based partially on Ursula K. Le Guin's Earthsea series and partially Dungeons & Dragons' Vancian spell system, where spells must be prepared through "memorization" before being cast. As in the Earthsea series, each spell is represented by some nonsense "magic word" which is treated as a verb by the game's text parser, so that one can use the FROTZ spell (which causes objects to glow and give off light) by typing FROTZ BOOK, in exactly the same way as one might type PICK UP BOOK or READ BOOK.

== Notes ==
In the game Zork III, a device slowly cycles through "scenes" from each of the Zork games as a number is displayed above it. A depiction of the sacrificial altar from the then-unreleased Enchanter appeared under the number "IV". Creators Dave Lebling and Marc Blank decided during the game's design that the magic system made it a standalone product. It became the first game of its own trilogy, usually referred to as "The Enchanter Trilogy". The others in the series are 1984's Sorcerer and 1985's Spellbreaker.

Infocom rated Enchanter as "Standard" in difficulty.

Enchanter is the only game in the Zork universe where lurking grues, although they still exist, are not mentioned by name; the game doesn't even know the word "grue".

The game has 17 ways to die.

== Legacy ==
Robin Wayne Bailey's 1989 novel Enchanter is a companion rather than a novelisation.

In 1993, about ten years after the original Enchanter, a remake of the game with graphics was developed and published by Japanese software development company SystemSoft for the NEC PC-9801, entitled Enchanter: Wakaki Madōshi no Shirén (ENCHANTER(エンチャンター) ～若き魔導士の試練～, Enchantā ～Wakaki Madōshi no Shirén～; lit. "Enchanter: The Trial of the Young Sorcerer").

Frotz, a modern open-source interpreter for Infocom games (as well as independently written interactive fiction) draws its name from a spell ("cause object to glow with illumination") in Enchanter and its sequels. Another spell, Blorb ("hide an object in a strongbox"), provides the name for a standard wrapper for interactive fiction multimedia resources. Several other IF tools have also been named after spells from the series.

== Reception ==
Released in September, 1983, Infocom sold about 50,000 copies of Enchanter by the end of 1984, and 75,000 over its lifetime or as part of the Enchanter Trilogy.

Computer Gaming World's Scorpia praised the game as "typically excellent" and up to the standards expected of Infocom games. Ahoy! wrote that "Enchanter is filled with the usual Infocom doses of wit, red herrings ... twists, turns, and surprises". It stated that while beginners would enjoy it, experienced text adventure gamers "may be disappointed. There didn't seem to be a whole lot to do. I solved the game in record time, for me; it left me wanting more ... The very moniker "Infocom" may be raising my expectations too high". John J. Anderson wrote in Creative Computing, "With Enchanter, they have scored again ... Enchanter is full of the delightful little touches we have come to expect from Infocom." Compute! stated that Enchanter had "nothing strikingly original about it, but you'll appreciate its high level of challenge and meticulously maintained continuity". It stated that "some of the humor lacks, well, subtlety", citing the name Dimwit Flathead as example, and that "the narrative won't win any literary awards, either". The magazine concluded that it "is an excellent game for adventure freaks".

Ron Boerger reviewed Enchanter in Space Gamer No. 73. Boerger commented that "Enchanter is [...] a lot of fun, and if you're into the all-text, no-picture sort of roleplaying, I heartily recommend it."
