= Bruce Daniels =

American hydroclimatologist and computer programmer

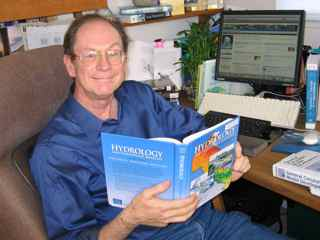
- Daniels in 2009
- Occupations: Hydroclimatologist, business executive and computer programmer
- Known for: Zork

Bruce Daniels is an American hydroclimatologist, business executive and computer programmer. He is known in Silicon Valley as one of the pioneers of the personal computer and user-friendly interfaces.

Daniels earned his Ph.D. from the University of California, Santa Cruz after receiving an Sc.B. and S.M. in computer science from MIT. He specializes in water-related impacts of climate change, especially in the American West. His contributions to decisions concerning California water quality date to 2003, when he was appointed to the state's Regional Water Quality Control Board. In 2011, he was honored as an ARCS Scholar in Northern California. In 2016, he serves as the elected president of the board of directors of the Soquel Creek Water District in Santa Cruz County, California.

Daniels has also been a computer programmer and business executive who has worked for Hewlett-Packard, Apple Computer, Oracle, Borland, Sun Microsystems and his own start-up, Singular Software, which created relational database management software for the Apple Macintosh. He was a lead programmer for the Macintosh, and a software manager for the Apple Lisa. When he was still a student at the Massachusetts Institute of Technology, he was one of the creators of an early personal computer game, Zork.
