= Spellcasting (series) =

Series of three interactive fiction games

Spellcasting is a series of three interactive fiction games designed by Steve Meretzky during his time with Legend Entertainment. The games feature the character Ernie Eaglebeak, a student at the prestigious Sorcerer University. Spellcasting 101 is the first game created by Legend Entertainment, a hybrid graphical and text adventure format.

== Plot ==
Ernie Eaglebeak, a young boy, resides with his oppressive stepfather Joey Rottenwood, who confines him to the attic. Ernie holds affection for his neighbor Lola Tigerbelly, a young woman who is clearly beyond his reach. However, Ernie's fortunes change when he is admitted as a freshman to the esteemed Sorcerer University, a renowned magical institution. Initially enthralled by college life and encountering a few attractive women, Ernie's journey takes a different course when the invaluable Sorcerer's Appliance is stolen. Consequently, Ernie is entrusted with a perilous quest to reclaim this potent artifact. Armed with his spellbook and a magical surfboard, Ernie embarks on a venture across the vast Fizzbuttle Ocean, visiting diverse islands in search of vital clues.

== Games ==
- Spellcasting 101: Sorcerers Get All the Girls (1990)
- Spellcasting 201: The Sorcerer's Appliance (1991)
- Spellcasting 301: Spring Break (1992)
- Spellcasting 401: The Graduation Ball. This part of the cycle was never created.
