= Bill Davis (artist) =

American artist (born 1949)

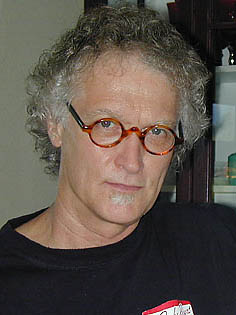
- Davis in 2007
- Born: May 1949 (age 77); Los Angeles, California, U.S.
- Occupations: Artist, creative director
- Known for: Adventure games; fine art painting
- Spouse: Betty Tikker Davis

William Robert Davis (born May 1949) is an Emmy Award-winning American illustrator, animation director, graphic designer, and painter. Davis received his Emmy Award for Outstanding Achievement in Graphic Design and Title Sequences for his work on NBC's The First 50 Years: A Closer Look in 1978. He was creative director at Sierra On-Line from 1989 to 1996, where he brought film production methods such as storyboarding and hand-drawn animation into the company's PC games.

Davis was later the creative director at Rocket Science Games and founded Mother Productions, a graphic design firm. Since the 2000s, he has painted under the artistic persona Trowzers Akimbo, focusing on landscapes of Yosemite National Park and the surrounding Sierra Nevada region.

== Early life ==
Davis was born in May 1949 in downtown Los Angeles and raised in the coastal community of Venice. He is the oldest of five children in a family with strong artistic traditions—both his mother and maternal grandfather were artists.

== Career ==
Davis attended the California Institute of the Arts, where he graduated in 1971 with a BFA degree and high honors.

=== Television ===
Davis was a lead graphic designer for NBC and received an Emmy Award for Outstanding Achievement in Graphic Design and Title Sequences for his animated title and segue films on NBC, The First 50 Years: A Closer Look in 1978. He created over 200 "More to Come" on-air slides for The Tonight Show Starring Johnny Carson, and he designed the logo for The Gong Show. Later, Davis worked as an animation director and designer for Kurtz & Friends.

=== Sierra On-Line ===
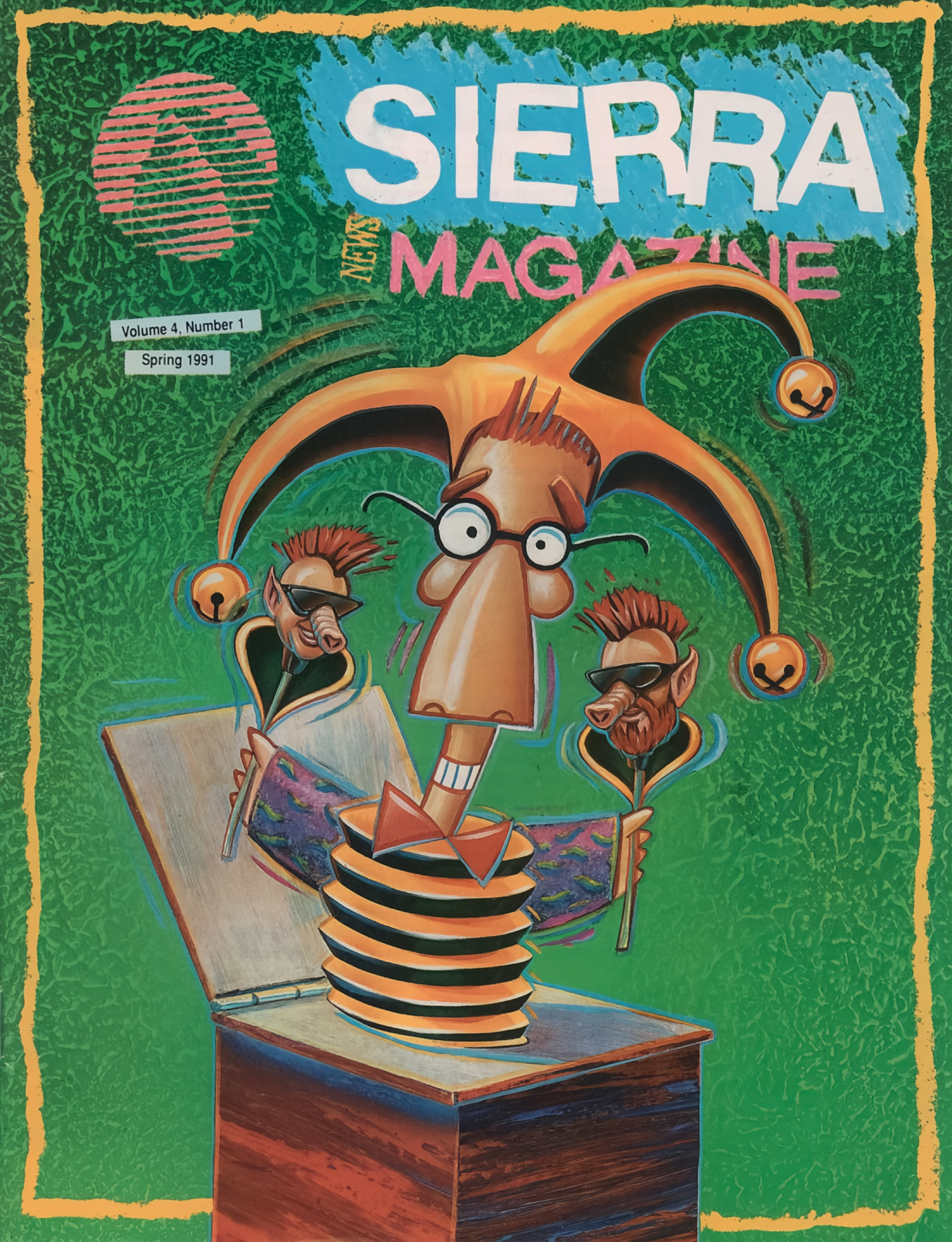
The Spring 1991 edition of Sierra Magazine featured Jones in the Fast Lane, illustrated by Bill Davis.

Bill Davis was appointed vice-president of development and the first creative director of Sierra On-Line in July 1989.

By the late 1980s, Sierra On-Line, led by Ken Williams, had adopted technologies such as CD-ROMs, sound cards, and VGA displays, which let the company's games look and sound more like animated or live-action films. Davis was recruited from Hollywood to adapt Sierra's production techniques to these capabilities.

Davis introduced storyboarding, adapted from film production, into Sierra's game development, which enabled production teams to grow without lengthening project timelines. Artists worked in traditional media, drawing backgrounds and animations by hand before scanning them into games, in place of the low-resolution digital methods then prevalent, and introduced animation techniques such as rotoscoping and squash and stretch. He established the role of art director at Sierra and began outsourcing animation work to international studios, a practice borrowed from the traditional animation industry.

Davis advocated a consistent art style within each series, a shift from earlier practices in which only each title had a distinct look, and encouraged matching a game's artistic style to its thematic tone. For example, Davis explored cubism for Leisure Suit Larry to reflect its quirky tone, persuading creator Al Lowe to adopt a cartoonish style that emphasized the game's wild visual humor.

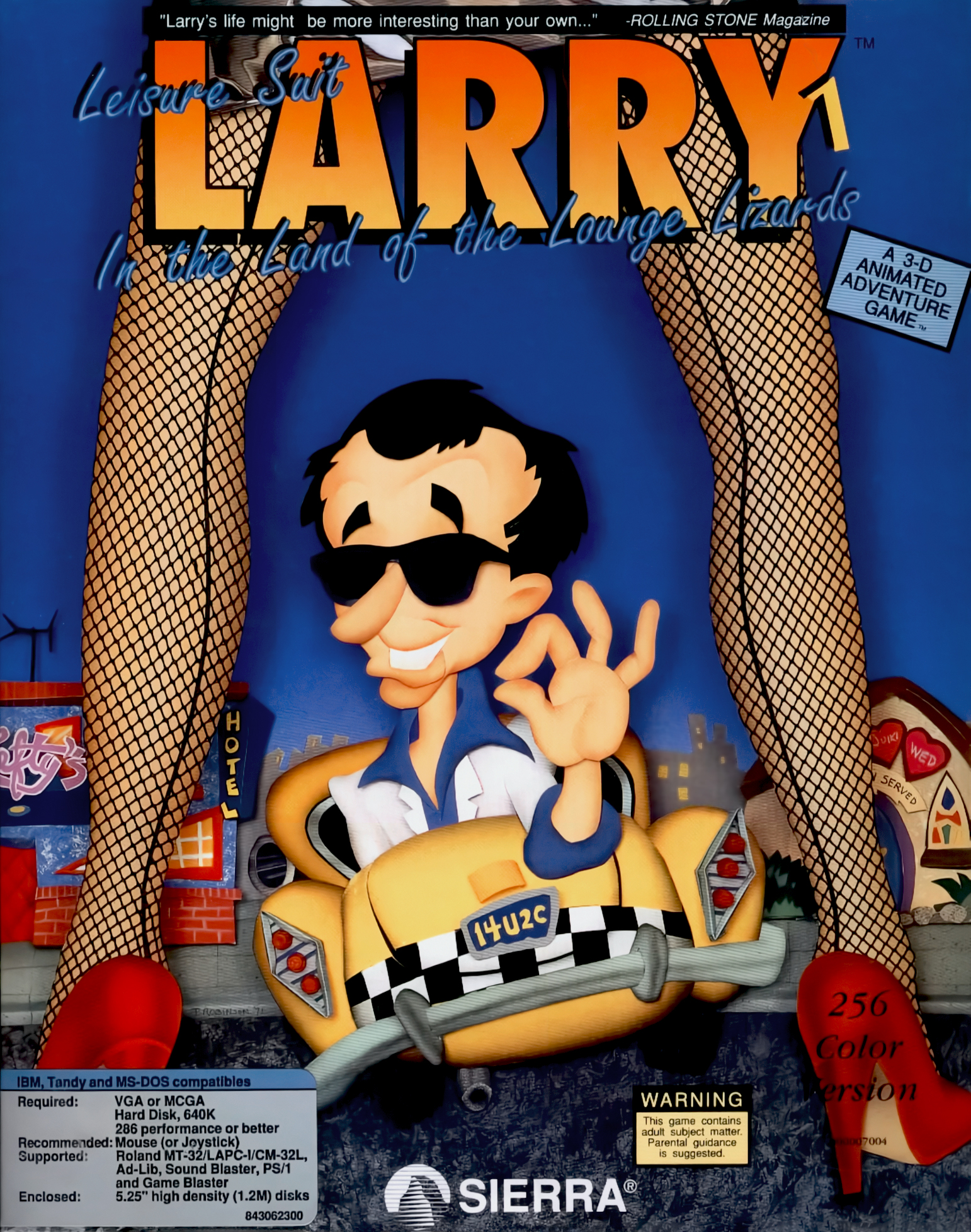
Davis proposed cubist influences and a cartoonish style for Leisure Suit Larry's transition to VGA graphics.

=== Other pursuits ===
In 1996, Davis left Sierra to become vice-president of development and creative director for Rocket Science Games.

=== Trowzers Akimbo ===
Since the 2000s, Davis has maintained an active fine art practice under the artistic persona Trowzers Akimbo. Working primarily as a landscape painter, he focuses on Yosemite National Park and the surrounding Sierra Nevada region, often painting on location.

== Personal life ==
Davis lives in Oakhurst, California with his wife, Betty Tikker Davis.

== Games ==
Name	Year	Credited with	Publisher
Oil's Well (DOS)	1990	creative director	Sierra On-Line
Quest for Glory II: Trial by Fire	1990	creative director	Sierra On-Line
King's Quest V: Absence Makes the Heart Go Yonder!	1990	creative director	Sierra On-Line
Space Quest IV: Roger Wilco and the Time Rippers	1991	creative director	Sierra On-Line
Space Quest I: Roger Wilco in the Sarien Encounter	1991	creative director	Sierra On-Line
Mixed-Up Mother Goose (VGA)	1991	creative director	Sierra On-Line
Leisure Suit Larry 5: Passionate Patti Does a Little Undercover Work	1991	creative director	Sierra On-Line
Police Quest III: The Kindred	1991	creative director	Sierra On-Line
Castle of Dr. Brain	1991	creative director	Sierra On-Line
Jones in the Fast Lane	1991	creative director	Sierra On-Line
EcoQuest: The Search for Cetus	1991	creative director	Sierra On-Line
Conquests of the Longbow: The Legend of Robin Hood	1991	creative director	Sierra On-Line
Hoyle: Official Book of Games - Volume 3	1991	creative director	Sierra On-Line
Mixed-Up Fairy Tales	1991	creative director	Sierra On-Line
Leisure Suit Larry 1: In the Land of the Lounge Lizards	1991	creative director	Sierra On-Line
Quest for Glory I: So You Want To Be A Hero	1992	creative director	Sierra On-Line
Police Quest: In Pursuit of the Death Angel	1992	creative director	Sierra On-Line
The Dagger of Amon Ra	1992	creative director	Sierra On-Line
Slater & Charlie Go Camping	1993	director, producer, art director, writer	Sierra On-Line
Pepper's Adventures in Time	1993	original concept	Sierra On-Line
Rocket Jockey	1996	executive producer	SegaSoft
Obsidian	1997	studio creative director	SegaSoft
The Space Bar	1997	executive producer	Rocket Science Games, SegaSoft
Jewel Quest Mysteries: Trail of the Midnight Heart	2009	art director	iWin
Jewel Quest IV: Heritage	2009	art director	iWin
Jewel Quest Mysteries: The Seventh Gate	2011	art director	iWin
