= Rocket Jockey =

1996 video game

- Developer: Rocket Science Games
- Publisher: SegaSoft
- Producer: J. Edward Patton
- Designer: Sean Callahan
- Programmer: Denis L. Fung
- Artist: Elliot Fan
- Platform: Microsoft Windows
- Release: November 15, 1996
- Genres: Action, Sports
- Modes: Single player, multiplayer

Rocket Jockey is a Windows video game created by Rocket Science Games and published by SegaSoft in 1996. The game's concept was developed by designer/lead programmer Sean Callahan, paired with an alternate reality 1930s America setting, conceived by VP of development/creative director Bill Davis. The player jets at high speed inside a grassy, enclosed sports arena on a rocket sled that is always in motion and chiefly steered with two grappling-hook guns mounted on its flanks. The rocket can change speeds but always flies about three feet off the ground unless it is engaged in one of the games' frequent and often-comic collisions.

The soundtrack features legendary surf rock guitar player Dick Dale. Three different Rollerball-style game modes are available for competition.

Although it was well-reviewed by critics, the game was burdened by a general lack of pre-release press coverage, steep hardware requirements, and extensive delays of a patch which added LAN play, which together led to poor sales. As time passed it has suffered a classic example of software rot and compatibility issues have appeared, making it very difficult to install the game on modern systems. Some diehards have created workarounds for this, most notably a custom modified registry key.

== Gameplay ==
Players control a "sled" (called a cycle in game), which is basically a rocket with small wings for directing the flight and grappling hooks mounted on the sides. These hooks can be fired into pylons, mines, sporting equipment, bodies, and anything else that can be grappled. The grappling hook guns are fixed to shoot out horizontally, 45 degrees to the left and the right of the sled's direction of motion. The player can tap a key to connect the left grapple line to the right one and fly free, leaving a clothesline obstruction for others. Hence, grappling hooks serve a dual purpose: tight turns on stationary objects, and disabling competitors. Sleds also have the ability to receive power-ups, such as repair and speed boost. Grappling hook projectiles and cables are also modifiable.

The sleds first available to the player have only minor differences, but sleds unlocked later in the game have major stat advantages, i.e. acceleration, top speed, boost, and maneuverability. Sleds are unlocked by stealing them from opponents. To unlock a sled, the player must knock their opponent off it, jump off their existing sled, climb onto the target sled, and successfully complete the level. Unlocked sleds are not lost when ditched for a newer model. Most of the sleds will also unlock if all of the levels of a certain tier of competition are successfully beaten. The tier that the sled will be unlocked on is generally one or two tiers after the first level the sled was introduced. Most of the end-game sleds cannot be unlocked in this way.

While each of the playable characters has a different name and logo, they all perform with the same characteristics.

=== Game modes ===
Rocket War is a deathmatch mode with the player facing computer controlled jockeys. The goal is to eliminate or disable all the opponents. Points are awarded based on how the player eliminates the computer opponents. Basic moves such as a "tripline" or a ram off receives minimal points, whereas more difficult moves, such as the "matchmaker" (joining two riders together with grappling hooks), or "ball and chain" (joining a rider to a mine), award much more points. Points are used to rank a jockey's run through each individual arena. Points are not required to advance to the later rounds, only the elimination of all rivals. Dismounting an opponent and stealing their sled is also an option, both to switch to a working or less damaged sled and to unlock it for use in later levels.

Rocket Ball is a twist on polo or soccer/football. Facing an opposing "team" which ranges from one to several independently acting computer opponents, the goal is to score as many points as possible in a set amount of time. Players can steal the ball from opponents, or eliminate them outright, while navigating the field and scoring goals with the sometimes explosive balls.

Referees run around the arena after the player on foot. They never mount a sled but will sometimes try to kick jockeys around the field. They can be treated exactly the same as other jockeys. Tether cables connect all jockeys, including the player, to their sleds. In this way, if a jockey falls off of his sled, or are cabled off, they remain attached to their sled by a short cable until a certain amount of time passes. This allows a jockey to land near their rocket, even if they were cabled by an opponent. Shorter cable lengths are also used, which shortens the amount of time a cable may be attached to a jockey or ball to only a few seconds. This generally forces the player to make shots at a net, rather than towing in the ball, as well as making it harder to disable the opponent. The rules of Rocket War still apply in Rocket Ball. Completing a match is dependent on the number of goals the player versus their rivals. Winning on a stolen sled will also unlock it in this mode.

Rocket Race is a race on an obstacle course. The course must be done in a certain amount of time, with either the player's sled passing through sets of pylons, or grappling on to certain pylons as they light up. Tethering cables and shortened cable duration on opponents are used, similar to Rocket Ball. Winning on a stolen rocket will unlock it, as in the other two game modes.

== Development ==
Originally developed for the Sony PlayStation, Rocket Jockey became a PC title because, according to designer/lead programmer Sean Callahan, "hardware limitations and longer lead times forced the switch to PC as the initial platform." A PlayStation version was still slated for release in the months after the PC version appeared, but it was eventually cancelled.

== Re-Release ==
The title was re-released by Call Your Vegetables and Jordan Freeman Group on August 28, 2023, alongside fellow SegaSoft game, Obsidian (1997 video game). Both products are available on Steam (service) and ZOOM-Platform.com.

The development team included Ron Cobb (concept artist and character designer) and Steve Meretzky (writer and director).

== Remakes ==
Several Rocket Jockey remake attempts have come and gone since the late 1990s. Most have been grass-roots initiatives conceived as modifications of other commercial games.

The first such project to see any progress used the original Unreal Tournament game as a foundation. A partial gameplay hack and a handful of themed maps were released.

Another ill-fated project appeared in the Quake 3 community shortly thereafter. Nothing was published beyond early development screenshots.

In 2005, a Rocket Jockey project was put together modding Unreal Tournament 2003. This effort lost momentum without publishing any results.

In October 2006, an effort to build a remake of Rocket Jockey was announced by independent developer. Unlike previous efforts, this project is not proposed as a modification of another game. The developer published several development screenshots early on in development. Then, in March 2008, the first alpha test version of the Solar-Ray remake was released, which allows the player to walk or fly around in a small arena and attach cables to one of two posts but does not include any real game play. In July 2008, Solar-Ray announced that development would be "frozen for an unknown amount of time!", then in January 2009, a SourceForge project was founded. Pre-alpha code is still available for download. Unfortunately the project is officially canceled.

A spiritual successor was being developed using the UDK (UNREAL development kit) by Six Shooter Games and called Sprocket Junkie! So far, only a demo for the PC has been released, the Sprocket Junkie website is offline, and no updates on its progress have been posted since May 2012.

In February 2018, a remake of Rocket Jockey using Unreal Engine 4 was announced by Burn Ward LLC. On September 18, 2019, Burn Ward announced on their Facebook page that development of the Rocket Jockey remake has been halted due to a lack of funding.

In 2019, a free, single dev, remake was made using the Unity Engine, The game has two new maps remade from the old game with new physics and similar style, The game also has support for the original levels and is still being updated. It is available for download in its itch.io page,

== Technical information ==
Rocket Jockey had very high hardware demands for 1996: at least a 90mhz "Pentium" grade CPU, and recommended 120mhz or higher.

Six-person LAN multiplayer was advertised on the original box but was not included with the game. The multiplayer patch promised by inserts in the game's packaging did not appear until several months after the launch and was never included in any retail version.

Because of a quirk of the installer supplied with the game, a specific DirectX 3 component (d3dhalf.dll) must be present in the Windows\System directory (on Windows ME and before) in order to complete normal installation. This file can be found in the DirectX directory of the Rocket Jockey CD, has been provided on Rocket Jockey fansites in the past, and can still be found on many general Windows and DirectX troubleshooting sites.

The installer also fails to install the game on Windows 2000 and XP systems, requiring either:

- a complete dump of the CD onto the hard disk, as well as movement of some sound files, and a modified registry key, or
- a specially made installer made by fans

Once installed, Rocket Jockey runs without reported problems under these newer versions of the Windows OS.

The custom installer with the LAN patch introduces input lag on Windows 10 which can be averted by using the executable of the original version from the CD. Modifications using a HEX editor can be made to run the game on modern wide screen HD resolutions.

== Reception ==
Reception

Review scores
Publication	Score
Computer Gaming World	3.5/5
GameSpot	7.6/10
Next Generation	4/5
PC Gamer (US)	85%
PC PowerPlay	68%
Computer Games Strategy Plus	2/5
PC Games	B+
boot	9/10

Rocket Jockey received generally positive reviews. Critics applauded the inventive gameplay concept, the unique ways in which players could humiliate their opponents, and the music, which Trent Ward called "the best soundtrack to ever bless a video game" in GameSpot. The graphics were generally regarded as not particularly impressive but solid and passable. Critics also found that despite the complex gameplay possible, the controls are simple and reasonable. Next Generation commented that "Rocket Science's Rocket Jockey manages, in one fell swoop, to nearly erase the memory of such Sega CD dog-eggs as Loadstar, Cadillacs and Dinosaurs, and Wingnuts with its surprising mix of style, humor, and fun." Robert Coffey of Computer Gaming World concluded, "There's little not to like about Rocket Jockey. It looks good, it sounds great, and it's certainly the most enjoyable way to sustain a concussion." [emphasis in original] Todd Vaughn of PC Gamer US wrote that "It blends a devil-may-care attitude with the crowd-pleasing violence of gladiatorial combat and the man-and-machine symbiosis of a demolition derby to create an instantly attractive and demanding would-be sport."

The one common criticism of the game was the unavailability of multiplayer on release. Critics noted that despite the box art promising LAN multiplayer, the feature was not included in the game, and that despite inserts saying that a patch to fix this problem was available on the SegaSoft website, the linked page only gave further excuses. GameSpot and Next Generation both stated that they would have rated the game higher if the patch were available upon release as promised.

According to PC Data, which tracked computer game sales in the United States, sales of Rocket Jockey reached nearly 3,000 copies by the end of February 1997. Erica Smith of CNET Gamecenter described these figures as "grim". Writing for Wired, John Alderman explained that the game and Rocket Science's Obsidian both "failed to generate the sales needed to justify costs", despite a high level of pre-release excitement. As a result, the company could not secure funding from a publisher to develop another game, and was forced to close in April 1997.

Rocket Jockey was a finalist for CNET Gamecenter's 1996 "Best Action Game" award, which ultimately went to Quake. The editors wrote, "Rocket Jockey accomplished the impossible: it brought us a completely original gaming experience by breathing new life into two game genres that have been done to death, first-person action and racing combat."
