= The Space Bar =

1998 video game

- Developer: Boffo Games
- Publishers: Rocket Science Games, SegaSoft
- Director: Steve Meretzky
- Designers: Steve Meretzky; Patricia Pizer; Tomas Bok
- Programmers: Brian Weed; Barbara Roman; Michelle McKelvey
- Artist: Ron Cobb
- Composer: Joshua Salesin
- Platforms: Windows, Mac OS
- Release: July 8, 1997
- Genre: Graphic adventure
- Mode: Single-player

The Space Bar is a 1997 graphic adventure game developed by Boffo Games and published by Rocket Science Games and SegaSoft. A comic science fiction story, it follows detective Alias Node as he searches for a shapeshifting killer inside The Thirsty Tentacle, a fantastical bar on the planet Armpit VI. The player assumes the role of Alias and uses his Empathy Telepathy power to live out the memories of eight of the bar's patrons, including an immobile plant, an insect with compound eyes and a blind alien who navigates by sound. Gameplay is nonlinear and under a time limit: the player may solve puzzles and gather clues in any order, but must win before the killer escapes the bar.

The Space Bar was conceived and directed by Steve Meretzky, a former Infocom employee who had previously created titles such as The Hitchhiker's Guide to the Galaxy. Meretzky hoped to design a graphic adventure in the spirit of text-based interactive fiction games, and to recapture that genre's breadth and level of interactivity. The Space Bar began development at Boffo Games in May 1995 under publisher Rocket Science Games, whose co-founder Ron Cobb—designer of the Mos Eisley cantina in Star Wars—served as the game's art director and concept artist. Its 18-month production was troubled, and Rocket Science went bankrupt before the game's release. The Space Bar was ultimately launched by publisher SegaSoft in July 1997, several months after its completion.

The game was a commercial flop, and Meretzky has described its sales performance as possibly the biggest disappointment of his career. Critics highlighted The Space Bar's extensive content and number of puzzles, and regularly noted its difficulty. Some praised it as a welcome return to its genre's roots, although Computer Gaming World found the game poorly designed and needlessly abstruse. The Space Bar became the second and final title released by Boffo Games, which folded in fall 1997. Steve Meretzky later joined WorldWinner to become a developer of casual games.

== Gameplay and plot ==
The player prepares to converse with an Auditon named Click Snap Snap Rattle. The pop-up menu displays options such as "touch" and "chat", and the PDA head-up display takes up the bottom of the screen.

The Space Bar is a graphic adventure game that takes place from a first-person camera perspective. The player points and clicks with a mouse cursor to navigate the game world, examine and manipulate the environment, look around and converse with non-player characters. In a manner that has been compared to Myst and Zork Nemesis, player movement is restricted to jumps between panoramic static screens; the camera view can rotate 360° on each screen. A pop-up menu is used to interact with characters and the environment: the menu's options change depending on the object selected, and can include actions such as "greet" or "take". At the bottom of the game screen, the PDA interface contains an item inventory, a mini-map, a journal and other features.

The Space Bar is a work of comic science fiction and detective fiction, set on the planet Armpit VI and inside a fantastical alien bar called The Thirsty Tentacle. The story begins with the murder of a private investigator near The Thirsty Tentacle, in an act of industrial espionage. Human detective Alias Node and his partner Maksh witness the murder, committed by a shapeshifting assassin, and Maksh is kidnapped by the perpetrator, who hides inside the bar. Assuming the role of Alias, the player interrogates roughly 40 aliens within The Thirsty Tentacle to locate the killer. Gameplay is nonlinear: the player may progress through The Space Bar and search for clues in any order. However, there is a time limit, and the player receives a game over for failing to arrest the assassin before they escape. It is also possible for the player character to be killed.

The core gameplay of The Space Bar occurs through Alias Node's Empathy Telepathy power. Activated when the protagonist establishes an emotional connection with another character, it inserts the player into the target's mind to live out its memories. Eight of these vignettes are included, with estimated lengths of 5–10 hours per segment. The Space Bar's structure and puzzles change to suit each alien. For example, the blind Auditon creature must navigate by sound; objects in the game world are invisible until they make noise. Seedrot of the Vedj race is an immobile plant, and must solve puzzles from a single location, while "714-Z-367" of the Zzazzl race views the world through compound eyes. In the end, the player identifies the killer via an Empathy Telepathy excursion into the shapeshifter's memories.

== Development ==
=== Origins ===
Boffo Games began pre-production of The Space Bar in May 1995, after signing with publisher Rocket Science Games earlier that year. The game had initially been pursued by other publishers, including Microsoft and Viacom New Media; the latter had offered to implement it with the Star Trek: Deep Space Nine license. Boffo selected Rocket Science in large part to collaborate with that company's co-founder Ron Cobb, a concept artist whose previous design work had appeared in the Mos Eisley cantina in Star Wars. Other bonuses included Rocket Science's marketing power, which had attracted high-profile press coverage to its past titles, and the publisher's promise to create 3D models for the game's alien characters. According to Boffo, Rocket Science sought The Space Bar as part of an effort to recover from its early years, following a string of major commercial flops. "They'd failed miserably with the first batch of games, and they were looking for folks ... who would fix that," Boffo's Mike Dornbrook said in 1998. He noted that it was "painful on the business side" to reject Microsoft's proposal, and that the publisher was "not happy" with the decision. The companies made an informal agreement to work together in the near future.

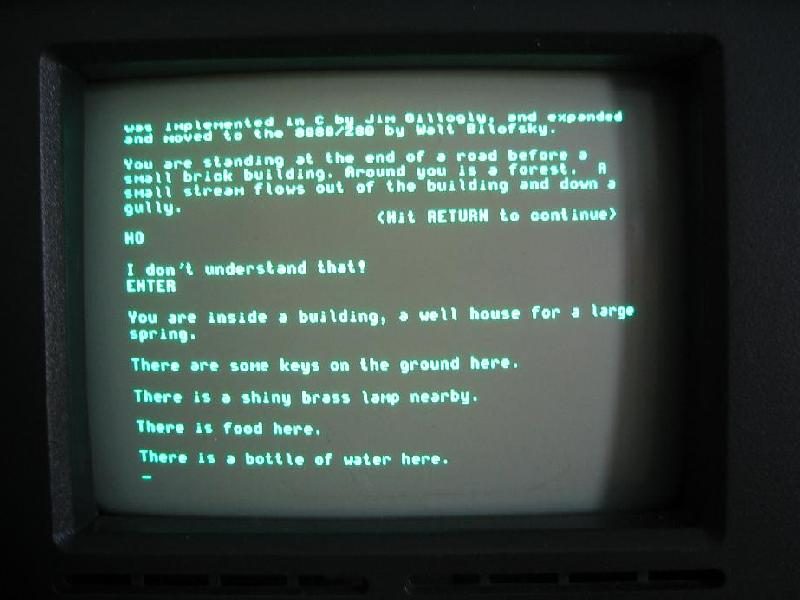
With The Space Bar, Boffo Games sought to emulate text-based adventure design, but with visuals.

The Space Bar was directed by Steve Meretzky, a designer previously responsible for The Hitchhiker's Guide to the Galaxy, Planetfall and other Infocom games. His core vision for the title was "an adventure game composed of a lot of smaller adventure games", which he compared to a short story collection. This was both an experiment and an effort to invent an adventure suited to the decreasing free time he perceived among people of the era. To design The Space Bar, Meretzky collaborated with his long-time associates Patricia Pizer and Tomas Bok, and included Ron Cobb in "a few of the early design brainstorming sessions". He later noted that Cobb provided "countless ideas" on the design front. Meretzky had imagined the basis for the game in the 1980s, during Activision's purchase of Infocom. At the time, Infocom's New Zork Times newsletter was retitled The Status Line for legal reasons; however, Meretzky wanted to rename it The Space Bar and set it inside a fantastical spaceborne bar. This idea later developed into a game concept, and Meretzky began planning The Space Bar in the early 1990s. In 1996, Meretzky called the result's similarities to the contemporaneous Legend Entertainment game Callahan's Crosstime Saloon a coincidence.

One of Meretzky's concerns with The Space Bar was to create a graphic adventure game with as much breadth and interactivity as Infocom's interactive fiction, which had not featured graphics. He sought to match the "background detail" of these titles, including their abundance of non-essential content to explore. Meretzky also tried to mimic the high difficulty of these older games, which he felt would lead to greater satisfaction for players. He noted during development, "I think it comes closest to recapturing the depth we've only seen until now in text adventures". Believing that an adventure game composed only of minigames would be incohesive, he devised The Space Bar's murder mystery storyline and Empathy Telepathy mechanic to bridge the gaps between the game's shorter segments. Meretzky considered the result his furthest-ever push into nonlinear gameplay, and later compared the solution to his design for Boffo's previous game Hodj 'n' Podj. After roughly four months of developing the design, Boffo began production of The Space Bar's visuals and code in the middle of September 1995.

=== Production ===
The Space Bar was created with the BAGEL ("Boffo Adventure Game Engine and Libraries") engine, which was designed to advance technological and interface ideas that Steve Meretzky had enjoyed in Activision's Return to Zork. However, like QuickTime VR and the Z-Vision engine of Zork Nemesis, Boffo Games chose to enable 360° panoramic scrolling of each environment the player visits. As Meretzky believed that "traditional 2D sprite-based animation wasn't suitable for much of what they wanted to accomplish," according to PC Gamer US's Todd Vaughn, the team opted to pre-render the game's graphics. In 1996, Meretzky summarized BAGEL as an amalgam of the most successful elements of every adventure game released during "the last few years", which he had studied for ideas. Boffo co-developed the engine with Rocket Science Games. Continuing a trend that had started with Hodj 'n' Podj, Meretzky wrote no code for The Space Bar, although he did offer design input on the engine. BAGEL was programmed in C++ and was created to be platform-independent; The Space Bar was developed for both Microsoft Windows and Mac OS. A very high-level programming language was implemented for the creation of in-game content, such as conversations, locations and puzzles.

Artist Ron Cobb's concept art for The Space Bar (left) guided creation of the finished game graphics by subcontractors such as Dub Media, and was Boffo Games' main impetus to sign with Rocket Science Games.

Ron Cobb worked as The Space Bar's concept artist and art director, the first time the latter position had existed in a Meretzky production. Previously, Meretzky had relied on his own "awful sketches" to direct the art team. One such sketch was the starting point for The Space Bar's Vedj race, which was then developed through several iterations by Cobb. The Mos Eisley Cantina sequence was among the game's points of influence, and the team sought to match that scene in quality, according to Meretzky. He noted that the game's diverse cast meant that they "weren't just creating new characters every week, but entirely new races." Boffo relied on out-of-house subcontractors for The Space Bar's graphics, including Dub Media, which had produced the 3D visuals for the developer's canceled Reverse Alien game.

Calling Cobb "something of a perfectionist", Meretzky described a moment when the final graphics for the Marmali race were first delivered; their number of toes was inconsistent, as Cobb's concept art had left this element vague. Cobb composed a rough model sheet to clarify the issue, and the graphics were revised. Meretzky later considered his collaboration with Cobb "one of the real thrills of my career". Mike Dornbrook, discussing the decision to choose Rocket Science for The Space Bar, said in 1998 that he believed "Steve was right about what Ron could contribute to the game".

The Space Bar was initially developed alongside several other titles at Boffo, including projects with Time Warner Interactive and Time. The Rocket Science and Boffo collaboration was first revealed in 1995, as one of two games made with the BAGEL engine; the other was with Time Warner. According to Dornbrook, the budgeting scheme to develop the engine was split across "at least" two games, a gamble that Boffo felt was viable because of its number of simultaneous projects. The Time Warner contract collapsed in the fall of 1995, alongside the publisher itself, and the Time contract was lost after roughly four months of production. Microsoft, planned as what Dornbrook called a "fallback", became unavailable after the start of its partnership with DreamWorks Interactive in March 1995. This had given DreamWorks exclusive rights to develop games in the interactive movie and adventure game genres; Microsoft agreed not to compete in these fields. With The Space Bar as Boffo's sole project, its engine was left underfunded. As a result, Boffo was forced to pitch new titles to other publishers to raise money, a process that continued throughout its development. Like the games with Time and Time Warner, however, none of these further projects were ultimately released.

During early 1996, a rumor about Rocket Science's impending closure spread within the game industry. Company co-founder Peter Barrett exited the publisher, which then underwent corporate restructuring in February: new hires included Bill Davis of Sierra On-Line, who became the vice president of product development. That same month, Rocket Science partnered with CyberCash in a venture to develop microtransaction-based arcade games for the Internet. According to Dornbrook, outside infusions of capital allowed Rocket Science to remain in business. The publisher signed Boffo for several more titles, and a deal was reached to increase The Space Bar's budget, which fully funded creation of its engine. The Space Bar was announced in mid-February 1996, alongside Rocket Science's games Obsidian and Rocket Jockey. According to Bill Davis, the titles represented a push toward greater interactivity in the publisher's catalog; this broke with its earlier reliance on full-motion video. The Space Bar was set for release between July and September, with an eye toward capitalizing on the holiday shopping season.

The Space Bar was the largest production of Meretzky's career at the time, with a team size and budget bigger than any of his previous games. He noted during development, "I've never worked this hard on a game before, or put so much of myself into it." Its development lasted roughly 18 months and its cost surpassed that of Hodj 'n' Podj—originally his most expensive project—more than twofold. However, Meretzky later remarked that The Space Bar still cost less than many of the era's other adventure games, and that "Boffo was a pretty lean operation". Budget limitations led to a number of excised features and cost-cutting measures, and became "extremely stressful" for the team. "[I]n terms of what we wanted to do versus what we could afford to do, it was actually my most financially tight project", Meretzky said. He gave the example that an on-screen character for the PDA interface was removed to save money. Additions to The Space Bar's script were made throughout development, including a significant portion in the beta test phase, for which the team was unable to record new voice-over. Ultimately, Boffo included the beta-era dialogue as silent text.

=== Switch to SegaSoft and release ===
As 1996 progressed, The Space Bar was pushed back to an October release in the United States, and translation efforts got underway for its international versions. Steve Meretzky said that Rocket Science Games' European partner company would be "marketing heavily in Europe." Rocket Science demonstrated The Space Bar alongside Obsidian at the mid-1996 Electronic Entertainment Expo (E3); Peter Smith of Computer Games Strategy Plus wrote that the two titles "made a big splash" at the show. However, Meretzky later told Gamasutra, "With typical Boffo luck, they [Rocket Science] ran out of money halfway through the project and sold our game to SegaSoft." In August 1996, Rocket Science laid off its marketing team of 20 people in an effort to transition exclusively to game development, and signed with SegaSoft to publish The Space Bar, Rocket Jockey and Obsidian. By the 20th, Rocket Science's old marketing division had been picked up by the publisher and put to work on these titles' promotional effort. All three games were set to launch by Christmas. SegaSoft described the deal as an effort to break into the computer game industry; its first releases in this market—Puzzle Castle and Fractured Fairy Tales—launched later that year.

Estimated in PC Gamer US's September 1996 issue as three-fourths complete and on track for October, The Space Bar ultimately missed Christmas, alongside Obsidian. The latter game failed commercially upon its January 1997 release, as did Rocket Jockey in late 1996. In reaction, SegaSoft split with Rocket Science in early April 1997 and the developer entered a financial downward spiral, closing later that month. This upheaval left The Space Bar "very much in peril", wrote Kate Hedstrom of GameSpot. The game was finished months before it shipped; Mike Dornbrook said development concluded in early 1997, but issues at SegaSoft regarding marketing delayed its release for half a year. Gamasutra's Frank Cifaldi noted that SegaSoft had begun to pivot to "online ventures such as the ill-fated Heat.net", and was uninterested in heavily pushing The Space Bar.

The first advertisements for The Space Bar, circulated in early 1997, were done in a National Enquirer style that Boffo greatly disliked. According to Dornbrook, the marketing staff responsible for the campaign and The Space Bar's initial packaging was fired, but the replacement effort was hampered because the former team "wasted most of the marketing budget". He accused SegaSoft of ignoring contractual guarantees to involve Boffo in marketing decisions, and rumors arose in April that Boffo was seeking an alternative publisher for the game. SegaSoft similarly scrapped Boffo's plan to run a "hint line" for The Space Bar, according to Meretzky, who believed that this hurt its accessibility for players. Dornbrook later called SegaSoft's handling of The Space Bar "a disaster", and said that Boffo "actually had to threaten cancellation of the contract to even get the slightest bit of involvement". On July 8, 1997, SegaSoft released The Space Bar for Windows 95 and Mac OS.

== Reception ==
Reception

Review scores
Publication	Score
GameSpot	7.7/10
Next Generation	4/5
PC Gamer (US)	90%
Computer Games Strategy Plus	4/5
Macworld	3.5/5
CNET Gamecenter	4/5

The Space Bar was a commercial flop. The editors of Computer Gaming World noted that it was "one of the year's best adventures, but, unfortunately, it never seemed to find an audience (call it the curse of Rocket Science)." Steve Meretzky later summarized that it "sold like bat guano", and described its commercial performance as possibly the biggest disappointment of his career. Noting that "the mentality of gamers had definitely changed" since the 1980s, Meretzky also expressed regret over his decision to make The Space Bar extremely difficult. He characterized this move as the most major design mistake of his career by 2000. However, both Mike Dornbrook and Meretzky were pleased with the game's critical reception. In 2011, Adventure Gamers named The Space Bar the 98th-best adventure game of all time.

PC Gamer US writer Allen Rausch hailed The Space Bar as a return to form for its genre, which combined the high points of interactive fiction with the strengths of modern graphic adventures. Its puzzle design, humor and level of interactivity received plaudits, although Rausch found fault with its disk swapping and some of its voice acting. Conversely, Scorpia of Computer Gaming World wrote that The Space Bar "just misses the mark" and is recommendable mostly to players "with a high tolerance for frustration." While Rausch and Scorpia agreed on the game's high difficulty and reliance on trial and error gameplay, she considered both the result of poor puzzle design. She also criticized the time limit and lack of traditional detective gameplay, and called The Space Bar's comedy strained and inferior to that of Superhero League of Hoboken, despite "some genuinely humorous touches".

CNET Gamecenter's Barry Brenesal enjoyed the game's visuals, humor, puzzles and Empathy Telepathy sequences, but noted that The Space Bar "is not the end all of adventure games." He agreed with Rausch's and Scorpia's assessments of the puzzles: the game features "arguably ... a greater density of sheer fiendishness than anything else on the market". In Computer Games Strategy Plus, Cindy Yans similarly praised the game as "a puzzle parfait from heaven", with an unusually extensive amount of content. Despite sharing Brenesal's admiration for the visuals, she broke with him on the quality of its animation, particularly the lack of lip sync, and agreed with Rausch on the spotty voice-over. As with Brenesal, Rausch and Scorpia, she noted the game's high level of difficulty: "Meretzky has constructed the most devious set of puzzles you're likely to encounter anywhere (with few exceptions)", Yans wrote. As a result, she echoed the latter two reviewers in recommending The Space Bar primarily to experienced adventure game players.

Steve Smith of GameSpot called The Space Bar's humor "tedious" and immature, and its art direction "uninspired and bland", despite Cobb's involvement. While Rausch found the character design "good, if a bit simplistic", Smith described the designs as "sterile and underdone". However, Smith still recommended the game, and praised its puzzle design and level of interactivity as a revival of earlier adventure game design. Next Generation's reviewer disagreed, calling The Space Bar's world non-interactive to a "frustrating" degree, and criticizing the design of certain puzzles. The reviewer liked its comedy and Empathy Telepathy mechanic, however, and concluded, "If you're a fan of Steve Meretzky, you might be slightly disappointed, but not by much." Summarizing the game, Michael Gowan of Macworld called The Space Bar funny and found its graphics strong. He considered it "good for a diversion" for fans of the Mos Eisley Cantina scene.

=== Aftermath and re-release ===
The Space Bar became Boffo Games' second and final release. The company attempted to survive through 1997, according to Dornbrook, but was "forced to give up" after concrete deals with publishers did not materialize. Meretzky noted that a failed project with MGM Interactive that year ultimately ended the company: the publisher requested several redesigns and platform changes, before canceling the game outright. As a result, Boffo closed in fall 1997, which Meretzky called in 2005 "one of the saddest days in my twenty-plus years in the industry." Dornbrook joined Harmonix by May 1998, while Meretzky became a consultant on Warcraft Adventures: Lord of the Clans and joined developer GameFX in the late 1990s. After the failure of the latter venture, he began a job developing casual games at WorldWinner in August 2000.

On October 28, 2022, The Space Bar was relaunched in a "Super Digital Deluxe Edition" by ZOOM Platform. The game's revival came as part of an agreement between the Jordan Freeman Group and Boffo Intergalactic Games, a company co-founded by Meretzky and billed as "the successor to Boffo Games". Boffo Intergalactic Games and Jordan Freeman Group would also release the game via Steam on March 30, 2023. The game would remain, like all of ZOOM Platform's previous Steam releases, DRM-Free.

== See also ==
- The Feeble Files
