= Hodj 'n' Podj =

1995 video game

- Developer: Boffo Games
- Publisher: Virgin Interactive
- Designer: Steve Meretzky
- Platforms: Windows 3.1, Mac OS
- Release: March 1995
- Genre: Various
- Modes: Single player, multiplayer

Hodj 'n' Podj is a 1995 computer board game and minigame compilation developed by Boffo Games and published by Media Vision and Virgin Interactive. It was designed by Steve Meretzky, previously known for adventure games such as The Hitchhiker's Guide to the Galaxy. Hodj 'n' Podj features 19 minigames based on peg solitaire, Pac-Man, Battleship and other games. These may be played separately or within an overarching fairy tale story, which follows the suitors Hodj and Podj in their attempts to rescue two princesses.

Meretzky conceived Hodj 'n' Podj in the late 1980s, as a way to revive simpler games that had become hard to obtain. It began production in 1994, and was the first product developed by Meretzky's company Boffo Games. Production was troubled, thanks to a $100 million securities fraud scandal at Media Vision, which led to the project's sale to Virgin. During development, Boffo discovered that Hodj 'n' Podj appealed to a wider demographic than Meretzky's past work, and Meretzky has since cited it as an early casual game.

Selling 40,000 to 50,000 units, Hodj 'n' Podj was commercially unsuccessful. Reviewers found the game simplistic but enjoyable, although Computer Gaming World criticized its reuse of minigames from titles like the Dr. Brain series. Retrospectively, Meretzky has called Hodj 'n' Podj a career turning point that led him toward casual game development, and an inspiration for his subsequent work with WorldWinner and Playdom. In 2009, he reported that Hodj 'n' Podj continued to receive as many fan letters as all of his other games combined.

== Gameplay and plot ==
The player seeks to win at the Battlefish minigame, a parodical variant of Battleship set in a fish market.

Hodj 'n' Podj is a computer board game and minigame compilation for one to two players. It is set in a fairy tale world, in the kingdom of Po-Poree, whose twin princesses Mish and Mosh have been kidnapped by the villainous Salmagundi. The player controls the suitor Hodj, and races the competing suitor Podj—controlled by the computer or a second player—to rescue the princesses first. Each turn, a spinner randomly determines the distances Hodj and Podj may travel across the game board.

The board features 19 important locations, each of which contains a minigame that the player completes to earn items or information necessary to rescue the princesses. These include Battlefish, inspired by Battleship; Pack Rat, inspired by Pac-Man; Garfunkel, inspired by Simon; and a peg solitaire game called Peggleboz. All 19 minigames may also be played in "stand-alone mode", without the board game elements. Once one player locates the princesses, they must take them to the center of the board to win. During the journey, the opposing player or computer may intervene and steal the princesses by succeeding in a competitive minigame.

== Development and release ==
After spending several years as a contractor for Legend Entertainment, designer Steve Meretzky started the company Boffo Games with two of his friends in 1994. Discussions about this venture had begun in 1993, but the final decision was made after Media Vision, an American electronics manufacturer, offered the group a lucrative multi-game contract in January 1994. As a result, the developer was founded in February. Hodj 'n' Podj became Boffo's first project under Media Vision, which acted as its publisher. It was the highest-budget production of Meretzky's career at that time (later surpassed by The Space Bar), and was the first project on which he acted only as a designer, rather than as a designer and programmer. According to Boffo co-founder Mike Dornbrook, the Hodj 'n' Podj concept was chosen in order to meet a difficult deadline proposed by Media Vision, which wanted Boffo's first title finished by August 1994. The simplicity of Hodj 'n' Podj made it viable in this timeframe, in part because its segmented structure allowed numerous programmers to develop different sections of the game simultaneously. Its completion date was ultimately set for September 30.

Following the closure of his employer Infocom, Meretzky had conceived Hodj 'n' Podj in summer 1989, five or more years before the project began. His initial goal was to revive "all those fun, simple games which had pretty much disappeared" at the time. To increase its value, he believed it needed a structure that tied together its minigames; and this inspired its storyline and board game motif. Its story was written in the style of Fractured Fairy Tales, from The Rocky and Bullwinkle Show. Meretzky later noted that other companies beat him to reviving these games in the years between Hodj 'n' Podj's conception and release, and saw success without using any overarching structures. However, he still felt "very happy creatively" with the final design of his project.

"I wasn't really trying to appeal to a new audience. As with all my designs the audience was basically me. I always just hope that there will be enough other people with the same likes as me to make the game a success."

— Steve Meretzky on the design of Hodj 'n' Podj

As production of Hodj 'n' Podj progressed, the team "began to suspect that it was going to appeal to a very different gaming audience", according to Meretzky. They discovered that an unexpected number of female players, families and non-gamers reacted with praise toward the game, compared to Meretzky's past projects. In a post-release letter to Computer Gaming World, Meretzky wrote, "[F]or the first time, I have designed a game which my 4-year-old daughter and my 70-year-old mother both enjoy." He has retrospectively called Hodj 'n' Podj an example of a casual game.

On May 10, after three months of development, reports broke that Media Vision was being scrutinized by the Federal Bureau of Investigation. It became public that the company had engaged in a $100 million securities fraud, which Meretzky later called "kind of a mini-Enron". Media Vision filed for bankruptcy in July, but Boffo was able to proceed with Hodj 'n' Podj during the publisher's dissolution because much of its funding had come as a down payment. Ultimately, the bankruptcy estate opted to give Boffo enough money to complete the game and then liquidate the final product, as this would be more profitable than canceling it mid-development. It was finished around the second week of October 1994, below its expected budget. Following bids from companies such as BMG Interactive and Ocean Software, Hodj 'n' Podj was purchased at auction by Virgin Interactive, alongside the titles The Daedalus Encounter and Rivers of Dawn. The United States bankruptcy court overseeing Media Vision's case delayed the final sale of Hodj 'n' Podj to December. Virgin obtained the game on the 9th, a point deemed too late in the holiday shopping season to justify a launch. In addition, none of the game's packaging had been created. As a result, the game missed 1994.

Hodj 'n' Podj ultimately debuted in March 1995. Dornbrook explained that Virgin had pushed its release back from January to avoid a conflict with the launch of its game The 11th Hour, which was ultimately delayed. Boffo's title was released with what Meretzky considered "a half-hearted marketing effort" by Virgin. Dornbrook remarked that it "was really launched with no marketing support", as a result of corporate restructuring at the publisher; and that the game's "PR was actually done completely by us." Like other games of the time, Hodj 'n' Podj was sold through traditional retail channels, which Meretzky later believed to be a mistake. He argued in 2009, "The [retail] channel evolved and eventually perfected the art of selling hardcore games to a hardcore audience, but it was horribly inadequate for selling any other type of game or reaching any other demographic."

== Reception ==
Reception

Review scores
Publication	Score
Computer Gaming World	2.5/5
Next Generation	3/5
PC Gamer (US)	80%
Electronic Entertainment	4/5
Entertainment Weekly	A

Hodj 'n' Podj sold between 40,000 and 50,000 copies, which Meretzky later called "a disappointing number even in the much smaller games market of the time." Despite its low sales, it went on to surpass all of his other games in its number of fan letters. By 2009, he still received as many fan letters about Hodj 'n' Podj as the rest of his games put together. He said in 2005 that Hodj 'n' Podj was his only game that he could play for enjoyment, and that he continued to "play [it] with my kids every now and then."

Ann M. Marcus of Electronic Entertainment summarized Hodj 'n' Podj as "charming", and considered it an "exquisitely illustrated, hilariously funny medieval romp". Despite some "minor quibbles," she considered the game "a true delight." The reviewer for Next Generation wrote that it "won't appeal to those hungry for action", but that it was ideal "for laid back fun on a rainy afternoon." In Entertainment Weekly, Bob Strauss summarized, "This impeccable British production is one of those rare CD-ROMs that can be enjoyed by both kids and adults—and its simple menu-driven interface guarantees that you'll keep it on your hard drive long after your other software has vanished."

William R. Trotter of PC Gamer US wrote, "Don't expect too much from this game. It breaks no new ground, pushes no 'envelopes,' and veteran gamers will no doubt be bored by parts of it." However, he argued that players who "accept Hodj 'n' Podj in the spirit in which it is offered" will derive "considerable delight in playing it — especially if you have kids." Computer Gaming World's Charles Ardai found the game's use of traditional games "downright baffling", given their presence in past compilations, as well as in Sam & Max: Hit the Road and the Dr. Brain series. Although he enjoyed the game's graphics and humor, he summarized, "You've seen all the puzzles before, often done better than they're done here. How jazzed can you get about Life or Solitaire, anyway?"

=== Legacy ===
A sequel to Hodj 'n' Podj was commissioned by Virgin Interactive before the first game's release, and development began in late 1994, funded by Boffo Games' earlier payment from Media Vision. The project was canceled after Virgin's restructuring in early 1995. According to Mike Dornbrook, an offer for the sequel was made later in 1995 by Sanctuary Woods.

In August 2000, Steve Meretzky joined WorldWinner as a game designer. Among the draws of the job, in his view, was that it allowed him to create games "very reminiscent of the kind of games in Hodj 'n' Podj". He has cited the game as a career turning point, which led him away from adventure games and toward the casual game market. While working at Playdom on the role-playing game Sorority Life, he took direct inspiration from Hodj 'n' Podj's implementation of minigames into an overarching structure. Sorority Life was a success, which Meretzky saw as proof that Hodj 'n' Podj's commercial failure was caused by marketing and distribution factors rather than design flaws.
