= Real Sound =

Real Sound may refer to:

- RealSound, a patented audio technology by Steve Witzel
- Real Sound (website), a Japanese entertainment website
- Real Sound: Kaze no Regret, 1997 video game
