= Wing Nuts: Battle in the Sky =

1995 video game

- Developer: Rocket Science Games
- Publisher: BMG Interactive Entertainment
- Platform: DOS
- Genre: 1995

Wing Nuts: Battle in the Sky is a game published by BMG Interactive Entertainment and developed by Rocket Science Games for DOS in 1995.

== Gameplay ==
The game is told by FMV cutscenes. It is an FMV rail shooter, like Loadstar, but in 2 missions the player must use bombs and balloons to destroy a bridge.

== Plot ==
The game is set in 1914. The player character is a young pilot whose base was attacked by Germans, out of the blue. To find the source of the planes, he shoots any German planes in sight.

== Development ==
In early 1995, Rocket Science Games' Mike Backes noted that the company was working on a fighter aircraft title set during World War I. He told Wired at the time, "The nice thing about Rocket Science is that we developed all these nifty graphics and great production resources, and now we're starting to look at how storytelling can change." Following the commercial failure of its early action-oriented titles, the developer restructured to focus primarily on the adventure game Obsidian, and cancelled several other projects in development. However, company head Peter Barrett confirmed in July that "we still have Wing Nuts, a World War I dogfight game, in the works" despite these new plans.

== Release ==
A 3DO version of Wing Nuts: Battle in the Sky was announced to be in development during E3 1995 and slated to be published by BMG Interactive, however, this version was never released for unknown reasons.

== Reception ==
Reception

Review scores
Publication	Score
Next Generation	3/5
PC Gamer (US)	71%
PC Entertainment	C
Computer Game Review	80/80/80

In 1997, Jeff Sengstack of NewMedia wrote that Wing Nuts "bombed miserably." Its sales by that point were below 20,000 units. He blamed this poor performance on the low quality of the game, which he described as "heavy on eye candy and devoid of game play."

A reviewer for Next Generation described Wing Nuts as "a basic rail-type shooter ... with humor making up for the lack of gameplay." He compared the game to Loadstar: The Legend of Tully Bodine, and gave it three out of five stars.
