= RealSound =

Obsolete software which enhances PC audio without replacing speakers

RealSound is a patented (US US5054086 A) technology for the PC created by Steve Witzel of Access Software during the late 1980s. RealSound enables 6-bit digitized pulse-code modulation (PCM)-audio playback on the PC speaker by means of pulse-width modulation (PWM) drive, allowing software control of the loud speaker's amplitude of displacement. The first video games to use it were World Class Leader Board and Echelon, both released in 1988. At the time of release, sound cards were very expensive and RealSound allowed players to hear lifelike sounds and speech with no additional sound hardware, just the standard PC speaker.

RealSound was an impressive enough technology that a few other PC video game developers, like Legend Entertainment, licensed it for use in their own games. However, as the early 1990s progressed, sound card prices dropped to the point that they eventually became a baseline requirement for gaming PC-audio, leaving RealSound obsolete as it no longer filled a niche in the market.

== Examples of games using RealSound ==
- Access Software:
  - Echelon (1987)
  - World Class Leader Board (1988)
  - Echelon (1988)
  - Mean Streets (1989)
  - Countdown (1990)
  - Links (1990)
  - Martian Memorandum (1991)
  - Amazon: Guardians of Eden (1992)
- Legend Entertainment:
  - Spellcasting 101 (1990)
  - Spellcasting 201 (1991)
  - Timequest (1991)
  - Spellcasting 301 (1992)
  - Companions of Xanth (1993)

== See also ==
- PC speaker
- Sound card
- Covox Speech Thing
