= Brian Moriarty =

American video game designer

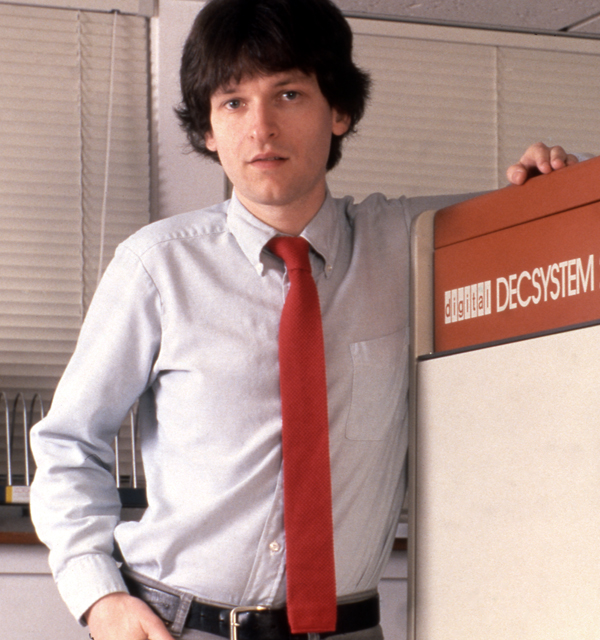
- Brian Moriarty stands beside Infocom's DECSYSTEM-20 mainframe (1984)
- Born: 1956 (age 69–70)
- Occupations: Video game designer, Professor
- Known for: Loom, Wishbringer, Trinity

Brian Moriarty (born 1956) is an American video game developer who authored several games for Infocom and LucasArts.

== Early career ==
Starting in 1980, Moriarty spent three years with Bose Corporation as a technical writer, then moved to the Atari 8-bit computer magazine ANALOG Computing as their technical editor. During his year at the magazine, Moriarty wrote two text adventures for ANALOG: Adventure in the 5th Dimension (1983) and Crash Dive! (1984). He also worked on Tachyon (1985), an adaptation of Atari's Quantum arcade game, which was previewed but never published.

== Infocom ==
In 1984, Moriarty moved to the young company Infocom as a microcomputer expert, becoming its fourth employee. Moriarty later recalled, "After about six months designing interpreters for computers, I threatened to hold my breath until they made me a game designer." Moriarty subsequently designed three Infocom interactive fiction titles: Wishbringer (1985), Trinity (1986), and Beyond Zork (1987).

== LucasArts ==
Moriarty joined Lucasfilm Games, later known as LucasArts, in 1988 at the invitation of Noah Falstein. There he designed his first graphic adventure game, Loom, published in 1990. Though the game was a commercial success and Moriarty had an idea for sequels that were briefly entertained, he opted to move on to other projects.

After working on an unreleased game based on The Young Indiana Jones Chronicles for the studio's educational division, he took over The Dig, a science fiction adventure game based on an idea from Steven Spielberg. The project had a notoriously lengthy and troubled development in three separate phases. Moriarty led the second incarnation, and when his version of the project collapsed in 1993, Moriarty departed LucasArts and joined Rocket Science Games. (The Dig was ultimately published in 1995 after a third development phase.)

== Rocket Science Games ==
Moriarty joined Rocket Science Games and worked on Loadstar: The Legend of Tully Bodine. The company was at its height, and was featured on the cover of Wired. Moriarty said of his stint at Rocket Science Games, "It was a silly time. The Rocket Science executives were out to be Hollywood moguls, and, to their credit, they got hold of some serious money, and to start off with, it looked as if it was going to be a really fun gig. And they got most of it right. ... But the Wired cover should have warned us. I mean, Wired is the kiss of death. If they're on top of you, then you should know that you're already out of date."

== Afterwards ==
In 1995 Moriarty became the head of game design for the online gaming service Mpath.

On occasion, Moriarty delivers public lectures. One of these, his 2002 Game Developers Conference presentation "The Secret of Psalm 46," has been adapted into a dramatic production and a graphic novel, and was included in its entirety as a video Easter egg in Jonathan Blow's puzzle game The Witness (2016).

Moriarty is a Professor of Practice in the Interactive Media and Game Development program at Worcester Polytechnic Institute.

== Games ==
=== ANALOG Computing ===
- Adventure in the 5th Dimension (1983)
- Crash Dive! (1984)
- Tachyon (1985, unpublished)

=== Infocom ===
- Wishbringer (1985)
- Trinity (1986)
- Beyond Zork (1987)
- Timesink (unpublished)

=== Lucasfilm Games / LucasArts Entertainment ===
- Loom (1990)
- Young Indiana Jones at the World's Fair (unpublished)
- The Dig (1995) - Credited for "Additional Additional Story"

=== Rocket Science Games ===
- Loadstar: The Legend of Tully Bodine (1994) - Credited for "interactive design"

=== Other software ===
- The Black Rabbit (1982, Atari 8-bit) - single-drive disk duplicator
- Snail (1983, Atari 8-bit) - disk drive RPM checker
- mUSE: A BASIC Memory Monitor (1983, Atari 8-bit) - programming utility
