= Spellcasting 201: The Sorcerer's Appliance =

1991 video game

- Cover art by Craig Nelson
- Developer: Legend Entertainment
- Publisher: Legend Entertainment
- Producers: Michael Lindner; Steve Meretzky
- Designer: Steve Meretzky
- Composer: Arfing Dog
- Platform: MS-DOS
- Release: 1991
- Genre: Interactive fiction
- Mode: Single-player

The text adventure game Spellcasting 201: The Sorcerer's Appliance is the second instalment of the Spellcasting series created by Steve Meretzky during his time at Legend Entertainment. All the three games in the series tell the story of young Ernie Eaglebeak, a student at the prestigious Sorcerer University, as he progresses through his studies, learning the arcanes of magic, taking part in student life, occasionally saving the world as he knows it, and having his way with any beautiful women he can get his hands on.

== Story ==
Following the events of Spellcasting 101: Sorcerers Get All the Girls, we find young Ernie Eaglebeak as a sorcerer's apprentice - which however quickly turns out to be a training simulation which our protagonist was taking part in during his first sophomore days at the Sorcerer University. Things have changed at the university since last year: the campus is being extended, Ernie's advisor Otto Tickingclock is now the university's president and Ernie himself has decided to pledge fraternity. Having settled on Hu Delta Phart, he begins participating in hazing rituals that are to prove him worthy of becoming a member, and quickly finds out that Chris Cowpatty, the Pledgemaster, dislikes him a lot and the tasks he gets assigned are much more difficult than those of other candidates.

Luckily, Ernie has got another extracurricular activity this year, assigned to him by Professor Tickingclock himself: unveiling the secrets of the very same Sorcerer's Appliance he helped recover the previous year. In order for the Appliance to unleash its full potential, Ernie must locate a set of attachments, which have been lost on or near the campus. Armed with exclusive access to the laboratory holding the Appliance and his trusty exploration skills, Ernie begins the hunt.

It quickly turns out that the two missions are strongly intertwined: the capabilities of the Appliance enabled by subsequent attachments allow Ernie to gain the upper hand on the tests, be it putting a moustache on a statue which got strangely slippery all of a sudden, kidnapping the mascot of another frat or spiking the punch at a heavily guarded party of the nearby Barmaid U, which in turn grants him access to more attachments. Of course Ernie would not be Ernie if he did not find time for some bliss in the arms of attractive females, including the always-willing Hillary Tickingclock, the luscious young Queen Libido of Balmoral mooning whom was one of Ernie's tasks and, above all, Eve, the perfect woman created by the powers of the Sorcerer's Appliance. He also once again meets his long-time love Lola Tigerbelly and, having accidentally come across some serious wealth which immediately drew the girl's attention, finally gets a chance to get closer to her - a chance which gets wrecked by a complete coincidence just a few hours later.

Losing Lola before their relationship has even seriously started is only one of many unexpected consequences of Ernie's hijinks. First of all, having caught his wife cheating on him with an elephant brought to the house by Ernie as one of his tasks, Otto Tickingclock dies of shock leaving the university president's post vacant. Several candidates apply, but a series of freak accidents causes most of them to forfeit—all but two, one of the two being the alchemy professor Bruce Hiddenmolar whom Ernie finds disturbingly familiar-looking and who seems to dislike our hero as much as Chris Cowpatty. The alliance formed by the two allows the professor to learn about the "identity assumption" power of the Sorcerer's Appliance, which he decides to use to make his last remaining opponent step down. Right after Ernie has brought in the Appliance's final attachment, which apparently is to enable the device's "necromancy" mode, Hiddenmolar confronts him at the laboratory, revealing in the obligatory scheme-revealing sequence that he is in fact Joey Rottenwood, Ernie's stepfather and a sworn enemy of the SU, planning to become the president to have the university disbanded.

However, Rottenwood and Cowpatty leave him alone at the locked laboratory. Ernie escapes, recovers the necromancy attachment from Rottenwood, brings the corpse of Otto Tickingclock to the appliance, and resurrects him. At the last moment, Joey's plan to become the president gets foiled, with the archvillain himself ending up at the centre of a sewage explosion.

Ernie Eaglebeak sophomore year concludes on a generally successful note. Although he does not win the affection of the girl he initially pursues, he does have several romantic encounters during the year. More significantly, he once again plays a central role in saving Sorcerer University from danger. He also joins the fraternity of his choice and advances to his junior year, setting the stage for Spellcasting 301.

== Reception ==
Reception

Review score
Publication	Score
Zero	90/100

The game received a positive review from Zero, whose Mike Gerrard called it "pure gold" and "the best adventure released since Spellcasting 101."
