= Spellcasting 101: Sorcerers Get All the Girls =

1990 video game

- Developer: Legend Entertainment
- Publisher: Legend Entertainment
- Designer: Steve Meretzky
- Programmers: Duane Beck; Mark Poesch; Bob Bates
- Artist: Peggy Oriani
- Composer: Arfing Dog
- Platform: MS-DOS
- Release: October 1990
- Genres: Interactive fiction, Adventure
- Mode: Single-player

Spellcasting 101: Sorcerers Get All the Girls is a 1990 adventure game. It was the first installment of the Spellcasting series created by Steve Meretzky during his time at Legend Entertainment. All three games in the series tell the story of young Ernie Eaglebeak, a student at the prestigious Sorcerer University, as he progresses through his studies, learning the arcanes of magic, taking part in student life, and meeting beautiful women.

== Story ==
The game takes place in a fictional world called Peloria, which appears like a modern society; however, magic has the place of science. Peloria is mostly occupied by the Fizzbuttle Ocean with islands where the player travels throughout the game.

The player character is Ernie Eaglebeak, a teenager just out of high school living in the town of Port Gecko, pining for his sexy neighbour Lola Tigerbelly and struggling in a seriously bad relationship with his stepfather, Joey Rottenwood. A break-through in his miserable life comes when he gets accepted by the Sorcerer University, a prestigious university of magic. After a dashing escape from Rottenwood's custody, Ernie makes his way to SU and enrolls as a freshman.

The player learns magic, explores the university, reads the (rapidly deteriorating quality of) student newspaper, and can watch the University's (comedically pseudoscientific) lectures which provide some backstory concerning the mythology of Peloria. In the meantime, Ernie is interested to know females such as the university president's daughter Gretchen Snowbunny or Hillary, the young wife of his ancient advisor Otto Tickingclock. Suddenly SU gets attacked by mysterious foes who kidnap Tickingclock and take away the Sorcerer's Appliance, a powerful magical device which could become extremely dangerous in inappropriate hands. Ernie has to recover the device.

Equipped with his spell book and a magical guided surfboard, Ernie sets out on a mission to several islands on the Fizzbuttle Ocean in search for items that will aid him in getting into the sinister Fort Blackwand. And everywhere on the way he finds places where the Great Attachments required by the Sorcerer's Appliance to operate used to be located, but are gone now.

The islands visited are:

- The Island of Lost Soles where the player restores the cursed souls of its inhabitants,
- The Island Where Time Runs Backwards where he has to work hard to avoid destroying the universe with a temporal paradox
- The Island of Horny Women to find out that there is such a thing as too much female attention
- The Restaurant at the End of the Ocean where he witnesses the six stages of a life of a restaurant and
- The Island of the Gods to find out that goddesses need love too.

The player can learn spells and obtain items during his quest until Ernie can take on the challenge of the fort and confront the mastermind behind the theft of the Sorcerer's Appliance, who turns out to be Joey Rottenwood, his own stepfather. In a climactic final showdown Ernie manages to shut down the Appliance's self-destruct system by burying it, along with Rottenwood, under a pile of whale dung, and frees all the prisoners, including his presumed-dead real father.

At the epilogue, everybody returns to the University, where Ernie gets scolded for irresponsibility, given a hefty bill and abandoned by Lola, but he still gets to advance a year.

== Technical details ==
The Legend interactive fiction interface

Spellcasting 101 is a text adventure game. However, much like all other games of this sort produced by Legend it runs in graphics mode (up to EGA) and takes advantage of certain EGA capabilities. While the traditional type-your-command approach is still possible, one can also assemble commands from words displayed in lists on the screen by clicking on them with the mouse; second, a graphical representation of the present location is also displayed on the screen and certain operations can be performed by clicking on different parts of the image as well. Finally, a compass rose is visible on the screen at all times, which in addition to enabling movement by clicking on it shows valid movement directions for the present location.

Unlike many text adventure games, Spellcasting 101 uses sound - with sound card support for music and sound effects played over the internal speaker using the RealSound technology.

=== Sexual content ===
Similar to the famous earlier risqué work of Meretzky, Leather Goddesses of Phobos, Spellcasting 101 offers two gameplay modes of differing levels of sexual content. In the default, "nice" mode, the women Ernie encounters have to be satisfied by such means as entertaining them, performing chores and so on, whereas in the "naughty" mode, such situations are resolved by sexual intercourse; the latter also replaces some of the images displayed by the game with more graphic (albeit not pornographic) versions.

Some of the sexual content is also present in "nice" mode and sometimes is important to gameplay. For example, at one point of the game, in preparation of a party, Ernie receives a spell from a fellow student whose purpose is to increase bust size, and promptly uses it to transform a stone bust into a makeshift ladder.

=== Copy protection ===
The game features a two-part copy protection system, with the first one involving filling in the gaps in Ernie's enrollment records with information from the registration form and class schedule enclosed with the game, at the time of him enrolling at the university, and the second using the enclosed map to obtain co-ordinates for various locations Ernie must visit on the Fizzbuttle Ocean. The word list interface makes breaking the copy protection by trial and error possible.

== Development ==
Following the closure of Infocom, designer Steve Meretzky began to work as a remote contractor for other game companies. During this period, Legend Entertainment founder Bob Bates contacted him about the possibility of developing a direct spiritual successor to Meretzky's Infocom title Leather Goddesses of Phobos, because of that game's commercial success. Meretzky felt that this was an unwise decision, and talked Bates into applying the comedy of Leather Goddesses to fantasy fiction, rather than repeating the earlier game's science fiction theme. Spellcasting 101 was the result of these discussions. The game's interface derived from Bates' work on the canceled Infocom game The Abyss, in development at the time of Infocom's closure. Legend subsequently chose to build on this foundation in its own games.

Meretzky personally disliked the interface of Spellcasting 101. He noted in retrospect, "The impetus for the interface was not a particular feeling that this was a good/useful/friendly/clever interface for playing adventure games, but rather a feeling that text adventures were dying, that people wanted pictures on the screen at all times, and that people hated to type."

== Reception ==
In 1996, Computer Gaming World named Spellcasting 101 the 11th funniest game ever.
