= Wishbringer =

1985 video game

- Developer: Infocom
- Publisher: Infocom
- Designer: Brian Moriarty
- Engine: Z-machine
- Platforms: Amiga, Amstrad CPC, Amstrad PCW, Apple II, Atari 8-bit, Atari ST, Commodore 64, MS-DOS, TRS-80 Color Computer
- Release: Release 68: May 1, 1985; Release 69: September 20, 1985; Solid Gold: July 6, 1988
- Genre: Interactive fiction
- Mode: Single-player

Wishbringer: The Magick Stone of Dreams is an interactive fiction video game written by Brian Moriarty and published by Infocom in 1985. It was intended to be an easier game to solve than the typical Infocom release and provide a good introduction to interactive fiction for inexperienced players, and was well received.

== Plot ==
The player's character is a postal clerk in the small fishing village of Festeron. The cranky postmaster, Mr. Crisp, orders the player to deliver an important envelope to the proprietor of Ye Olde Magick Shoppe. The proprietor asks the player to rescue her cat from a mysterious sorceress known only as The Evil One. Stepping out of the store, the player finds that quaint Festeron has mysteriously been transformed into a more sinister town called Witchville. There are but a few hours to defeat The Evil One.

== Gameplay ==
A player can solve Wishbringer by using the wishing stone, then play it again without using it to get a higher score. A few Infocom games have puzzles with multiple solutions (for example, the "Loud Room" from Zork). However, Wishbringer has several such puzzles, many of which can be solved either in a straightforward (that is, non-magical) manner or by using one of the stone's wishes. The game can be successfully completed without using any wishes: At the Congratulations screen, the game informs the player of this fact, if the player had used any wishes. Conversely, it is impossible to finish the game using all of the stone's wishes (wishing for flight invariably causes the game to be lost.)

== Development ==
The work on Wishbringer began in 1984 when Infocom marketing requested an easy game to introduce customers to text adventures. Moriarty suggested adding a magic ring, then a magic rock, to the package, then began writing the game based on the rock. Because it sold well, Moriarty mentioned in July 1986 that a sequel was forthcoming, but none appeared.

The relations of the Wishbringer objects to the wishes are described in the feelies, as a form of copy protection. When Infocom games were later repackaged by Activision, the information in the feelies had to be reproduced in printed form. Included in the Wishbringer package are several items, which Infocom called feelies: a book, The Legend of Wishbringer, that explains how the magic stone came to be (in the Solid Gold release, an in-game object included in the player's starting inventory instead of the packaging); the envelope and letter to be delivered to Ye Olde Magick Shoppe; a "postal zone map" of Festeron; and a plastic glow-in-the-dark replica of the stone.

== Reception ==
Wishbringer was very well received. Infocom sold about 75,000 copies in the first six months; it was the company's fifth best-selling game, selling about 150,000 copies in total.

According to Your Computer, it is "all great stuff. Like all Infocom adventures, the prose is of the highest quality." Commodore Power Play reviewer called it "without a doubt, one of the top three beginner's interactive fiction games." The Rainbow Magazine wrote that it rated it 9.95 out of 10, while Computer & Video Games awarded it a perfect 10/10. Other review scores included a 92% from Amstrad Action, an 88% from CU Amiga, and an overall 85% from Zzap!64.

== Legacy ==
Wishbringer was one of five top-selling titles to be re-released in Solid Gold versions including in-game hints. Craig Shaw Gardner novelized Wishbringer in the Infocom Book line.
