= Rocket Science Games =

Video game developer

- Type: Private
- Founded: 1993; 33 years ago
- Founders: Steve Blank; Peter Barrett
- Defunct: 1997
- Headquarters: San Francisco, California, US
- Key people: Steve Blank, CEO; Peter Barrett; Ron Cobb; Michael Backes; Bill Davis; Will Harvey

Rocket Science Games was a video game developer and publisher that created games for consoles and personal computers from 1993 to 1997. The company released Loadstar: The Legend of Tully Bodine, Cadillacs and Dinosaurs: The Second Cataclysm, Wing Nuts: Battle in the Sky, Rocket Jockey, and Obsidian. The Space Bar was the final game developed by Rocket Science. After the company folded, it was published by SegaSoft. Six additional games were never completed.

Rocket Science Games was founded by serial startup entrepreneur Steve Blank in 1993. The staff included auteurs of video game design, such as Brian Moriarty and Will Harvey. Despite heavy promotion of the company and its products, all of its games reviewed and sold poorly, and the company turned out to be a high profile failure.

== History ==
Rocket Science Games (RSG) was an independent game studio founded by Steve Blank and Peter Barrett in 1993 to combine the creative forces of Hollywood and Silicon Valley into compelling cinematic videogames. Sega Enterprises and the Bertelsmann Music Group infused RSG with $12 million in funding in May 1994, thus becoming RSG's North American and European publishers, respectively. Staffed with some of the brightest rising stars of the computer, comics and movie industries, RSG created a huge buzz even before the release of its first titles and claimed to be on the verge of revolutionizing the video game industry using full motion video (FMV). Founded at the height of the FMV video game craze of the 1990s, its first three games utilized the technology heavily. All of them were commercial failures; Jeff Sengstack of NewMedia wrote that they "bombed miserably" and each sold below 20,000 units by 1997.

"We raised $35 million and after 18 months made the cover of Wired magazine. The press called Rocket Science one of the hottest companies in Silicon Valley and predicted that our games would be great because the storyboards and trailers were spectacular. 90 days later, I found out our games are terrible, no one is buying them, our best engineers started leaving, and with 120 people and a huge burn rate, we’re running out of money and about to crash."

— Founder Steve Blank in 2013

After the disappointing sales of its early games, RSG turned to SegaSoft to take over as the sole publisher for its titles in development. Sega canceled about half of the titles RSG was working on to reduce costs and speed up releases, with a noticeable negative effect on their quality. Rocket Jockey shipped missing local area network support that had been heavily promoted to the press and was even advertised on the box, but wouldn't be patched into the game for several months. Obsidian also suffered quality problems as it had several bugs present at the time of its release, including a few that prevented completion of the game. Despite pre-release excitement for both Rocket Jockey and Obsidian, neither did particularly well financially. Unable to secure additional funding, RSG was forced to close down in April 1997.

About a year before closing, in February 1996, RSG announced a partnership with CyberCash, Inc. to launch a virtual arcade service based on micropayments. CyberCash, a virtual currency company, would provide the financial infrastructure for the arcade and use it to jump-start its micropayment "electronic coin service". This announcement was heavily circulated by the media and, along with several other micropayment based services, was heralded as the next big thing in Internet commerce. The arcade was to be based on RSG "V3 Internet game engine" and feature at least 20 classic arcade games with a launch as early as the second half of 1996. The unnamed service was never given a firm launch date nor were any specific titles mentioned. After the initial flurry of excitement the partnership failed to produce any further announcements and the service was never heard from again. It may have been a casualty of the cuts SegaSoft made later that same year when it acquired RSG. Later SegaSoft partnered with CyberCash and used its micropayment system, now named the CyberCoin service, for its Heat.net online gaming service. Heat.net was shut down in 2000 when SegaSoft was restructured into Sega.com and CyberCash filed for bankruptcy a year later.

Written by game designer Steve Meretzky of Infocom fame, The Space Bar by Boffo Games was originally to be published by RSG but was transferred to SegaSoft after RSG closed.

== Legacy ==
Darwin Pond was an unreleased game completed before the fall of RSG but was never commercially released. Later its creator Jeffrey Ventrella released it for free over the Internet. A new version of Darwin Pond is currently being developed by Ventrella and Brian Dodd.

Rocket Jockey still receives some media and developer attention, with five different remake efforts on record, mostly games modded to recreate the original gameplay. In 2011, Ars Technica revisited the game in an article titled "Masterpiece: Rocket Jockey for the PC -- you heard me."

== Games ==
=== Released ===
- Loadstar: The Legend of Tully Bodine (1994)
- Cadillacs and Dinosaurs: The Second Cataclysm (1994)
- Wing Nuts: Battle in the Sky (1995)
- Rocket Jockey (1996)
- Obsidian (1997)
- The Space Bar (1997)

=== Unreleased (alphabetical) ===
- Dark Ride
- Darwin Pond
- Ganymede
- Loadstar II: Showdown on Phobos
- Pest!
- Rocket Boy
