= Slater & Charlie Go Camping =

1993 video game

- Developer(s): Sierra On-Line
- Publisher(s): Sierra On-Line
- Director(s): Bill Davis
- Producer(s): Bill Davis
- Programmer(s): Vana Baker
- Artist(s): Bill Davis; Darlou Gams
- Writer(s): Bill Davis
- Composer(s): Neal Grandstaff
- Engine: Sierra's Creative Interpreter
- Platform(s): MS-DOS, Macintosh
- Release: NA: May 19, 1993
- Genre(s): Educational
- Mode(s): Single-player

Slater & Charlie Go Camping is an interactive storybook developed and published by Sierra On-Line. It was released for MS-DOS and Macintosh on May 19, 1993. It is a third-person perspective educational game.

== Reception ==
Computer Gaming World in 1993 called Slater & Charlie "a remarkably smooth blend of children's storybooks with Saturday morning cartoons". PC Magazine said that while "not quite as richly animated as the Living Books, the story still has lots of hot spots for younger children".
