= Echelon (1987 video game) =

1987 flight simulator video game

- Developer: Access Software
- Publisher: Access Software
- Platforms: Amstrad CPC, Apple II, Commodore 64/128, MS-DOS, ZX Spectrum
- Release: 1987
- Genre: Flight Simulator

Echelon is a video game published in 1987 by Access Software.

== Gameplay ==
Echelon is a game in which the player pilots a C-104 Combat Exploration Vehicle to find a base that has been used by pirates on the planet Isis in the year 2096. The PC version uses Access's RealSound technology.

== Reception ==
Hosea Battles reviewed the Commodore 64 version for Computer Gaming World, stating that "If you like arcade action, flight simulation, space combat, exploration, mystery, and adventure, this game is for you".
