= AMA Superbike (video game) =

1999 video game

- Developer: Motorsims
- Publisher: Motorsims
- Platform: Windows
- Release: NA: October 1999
- Genre: Racing
- Modes: Single-player, multiplayer

AMA Superbike is a racing game developed and published by Motorsims for Microsoft Windows in 1999. It is a video game based on the AMA Superbike Championship.

== Gameplay ==
In AMA Superbike, players select from a roster of nine licensed motorcycles divided between the 600cc Supersports class and the 750cc Superbike class, then take them onto nine real‑world racing circuits. Races unfold from a first‑person perspective that incorporates head movement to mirror a rider's view while leaning through turns. Each track requires practice to learn proper racing lines and the distinct handling characteristics of the bikes. During competition, players navigate curves, manage throttle, and maintain control at high speeds while contending with both computer‑controlled opponents and human racers in online sessions. The game includes crash sequences, physics‑based reactions to leaving the track or accelerating through curves, and the ability to participate in multiplayer races when available. Menu navigation precedes each event, where players configure settings before launching into practice laps or full races.

== Development ==
AMA Superbike was developed by Motorsims, a company founded in 1997. The game went gold on August 18, 1999.

Former AMA Daytona Superbike Champion and television sports analyst David Sadowski provided commentary and analysis to the game.

== Reception ==
Reception

Aggregate score
Aggregator	Score
GameRankings	53%

Review scores
Publication	Score
CNET Gamecenter	4/10
Computer Games Strategy Plus	2/5
Computer Gaming World	2.5/5
Game Informer	4.75/10
GameSpot	7.4/10
IGN	4.5/10

The game received mixed reviews according to the review aggregation website GameRankings.

AMA Superbike ranked 8th on PC Data's list of Top-Selling PC Games for the week of January 2 to 8 in 2000.
