= Daniel C. Lynch =

American computer network engineer

Daniel Courtney Lynch (August 16, 1941 – March 30, 2024) was an American computer network engineer. He worked at the University of California's Information Sciences Institute (ISI). In 1986, he established the first conference dedicated to the emerging Internet which evolved into the annual Interop conference.

He cofounded one of the first online payment companies, CyberCash, in 1994.

In 2019, he was inducted into the Internet Hall of Fame.
