= Boffo Games =

American video game developer (1994–1997)

- Company type: Defunct
- Industry: Video games
- Founded: February 1994
- Defunct: Fall 1997
- Key people: Steve Meretzky; Mike Dornbrook; Leo DaCosta
- Website: boffo.us

Boffo Games was a video game developer founded in 1994 by Steve Meretzky, Mike Dornbrook, and Leo DaCosta. The logo was designed by Gayle Syska, formerly of Infocom. Boffo produced two games, Hodj 'n' Podj and The Space Bar, before closing its doors in 1997. Hodj 'n' Podj was originally designed for Media Vision but it divested all of its multimedia interests following a securities-fraud scandal and the title was purchased by Virgin Interactive. The Space Bar was originally to be published by Rocket Science Games (RSG) but SegaSoft bought out RSG and became the game's publisher.

== History ==
In late 1993, designer Steve Meretzky began to consider founding an independent game development studio with his friends Mike Dornbrook and Leo DaCosta. The three of them had gone to the Massachusetts Institute of Technology together, and Meretzky had worked with Dornbrook at Infocom and with DaCosta during the 1990s.

Following the 1989 closure of Infocom, Meretzky worked on a contractual basis for companies such as Legend Entertainment. However, Meretzky later called this period of remote work "creatively unsatisfying" and sometimes "frustrating". He preferred to work on location with a team, and he decided that he no longer wanted "to design games for someone else thousands of miles away."

The involvement of Dornbrook, a business school graduate, made the idea of an independent company more viable. According to Meretzky, the final impetus for the project came when Dornbrook read an article about Media Vision's new game division, founded in mid-1993 under record label executive Stan Cornyn. As Cornyn was an acquaintance of Dornbrook's, Dornbrook was able to secure a New York meeting with the executive's second-in-command, Linda Rich.

== List of games made by Boffo ==
- Hodj 'n' Podj
- Reverse Alien (cancelled)
- The Space Bar
