= Stationfall =

1987 video game

- Cover art
- Developer: Infocom
- Publisher: Infocom
- Designer: Steve Meretzky
- Engine: Z-machine
- Platforms: Amiga, Amstrad CPC, Apple II, Atari 8-bit, Atari ST, Commodore 64, MS-DOS, Mac
- Release: April 30, 1987
- Genres: Adventure, Interactive fiction
- Mode: Single-player

Stationfall is an interactive fiction game written by American video game developer Steve Meretzky and released by Infocom in 1987. It was published for the Commodore 64, Amiga, Amstrad CPC, Apple II, Atari 8-bit computers, Atari ST, and MS-DOS. The game is a sequel to Planetfall, one of Infocom's most popular games. It is Infocom's twenty-fifth game.

== Plot ==
Following the events on Resida in Planetfall, the player's character received a promotion from lowly Ensign Seventh Class to Lieutenant First Class. The life of an officer in the Stellar Patrol is no better than that of a humble enlistee, however. Five years after the thrills of saving an entire planet from destruction, the character is stuck in a boring desk job that demands piles of tedious paperwork instead of menial cleaning duties.

A typically boring assignment comes in: accompany a spacetruck to a space station and pick up a load of "Request for Stellar Patrol Issue Regulation Black Form Binders Request Form Forms". To make things even more dull, spacetrucks are fully automated, so it will pilot itself once the proper coordinates are entered.

But the task does authorize the use of a robot assistant, and coincidentally enough, Floyd, a beloved companion revived at the end of Planetfall, is one of the choices.

Once the player and Floyd reach the space station, they find it largely deserted. There are two living things on board: an ostrich and an Arcturian balloon creature, both apparently in perfect health. There are plenty of automated devices. It is unclear where the people have gone. The mechanical hull welders also seem intent on inflicting serious harm, which is unusual behavior.

Exploring the deserted complex, there are initially few clues. The station's missing commander audio log can be found, but it provides no solid answers. A ship of unfamiliar design is docked, empty except for an alien skeleton and a strange pedestal that looks like it should hold something but stands empty.

Floyd finds two fellow robots: an intellectual model named Plato and a not-yet-conscious "baby" named Oliver. Plato accompanies Floyd and the player, although his personality slowly changes from mild to sullen to aggressive. It is slowly revealed that every machine still functioning on the space station is hostile towards humans: besides the actively homicidal tendencies of the hull welders, the food dispensers manufacture poisonous food and drinks, and even seemingly harmless devices will explode unless powered down. Before long, Plato attempts to kill the player; Floyd is conflicted between the two friendships but reluctantly destroys the other robot. He moves from sadness over Plato's death to belligerence before disappearing altogether.

A pyramid-shaped artifact devised by the Zeenak race is emitting some sort of energy, the player discovers (thanks to Plato revealing everything upon trying to assassinate the player), and this energy causes anything mechanical to rebel against the human Hunji race. All the people on the space station were killed by the Hunji machinery. Whatever the Zeenak pyramid is, the machines are building countless replicas of it that will be sent to "infect" other installations and similarly take them over. Before the player can put a stop to this, however, Floyd reappears, completely under the evil influence of the Zeenak pyramid. In order to survive, the player has no choice but to kill Floyd. This time, however, the damage is too severe and there is no chance of repair for the robot. After the pyramid is defeated, Oliver finally comes to life, and seems almost to be a reincarnation of the once-childlike and playful Floyd.

== Feelies ==
Infocom was famous for including extra items, called feelies, with each game package. These documents and objects were generally related to the game in some way, and sometimes provided information necessary to complete the game. The feelies in the Stationfall package:

- Blueprints for a "Gamma-Delta-Gamma Class deep space station" (detailed maps of the space station in which the game is set)
- Three forms: an HB-56-V Class Three Spacecraft Activation form, a JZ-59-G Robot Use Authorization form, and a QX-17-T Assignment Completion form (which also contained "Astrogator navigational data" needed to reach the space station)
- A Stellar Patrol patch for the rank of Lieutenant First Class

== Reception ==
Reception

Award
Publication	Award
C+VG	C+VG Hit

Charles Ardai of Computer Gaming World called Stationfall "a worthy successor", stating that it had its predecessor's wit and interesting story.

In a review for Amstrad Action, the reviewer gave Stationfall a 90 out of 100, stating "To some extent (and with the notable exception of Hitchhikers) Meretzky's games are traditional adventures in the sense that they place a lot of emphasis on exploration, discovery and puzzle-solving. The spice is added by Meretzky's inimitable humour."
