= Leather Goddesses of Phobos 2 =

1992 video game

- Developer: Infocom
- Publisher: Activision
- Producer: Tom Sloper
- Designer: Steve Meretzky
- Programmer: William David Volk
- Artists: Mimi Doggett; Clifford Lau; Kristin J. Mallory
- Writer: Steve Meretzky
- Composer: Russell Lieblich
- Engine: Multimedia Applications Development Environment
- Platform: MS-DOS
- Release: 1992
- Genre: Adventure
- Mode: Single-player

Leather Goddesses of Phobos 2: Gas Pump Girls Meet the Pulsating Inconvenience from Planet X! (also known as Leather Goddesses 2 or LGOP2) is a graphic adventure game written by Steve Meretzky for MS-DOS. It was published by Activision in 1992 under the Infocom label. LGOP2 is the sequel to the 1986 interactive fiction game Leather Goddesses of Phobos, also written by Meretzky. LGOP2 featured full-screen graphics and a point-and-click interface instead of Infocom's text parser.

== Gameplay ==
Whereas the original Leather Goddesses title was a text adventure, Leather Goddesses 2 adds detailed though somewhat cartoonish visuals. The game is played through a first-person window and features zero text input, instead using a point-and-click interface to interact with everything on screen. The player has the choice of playing through three different perspectives; Zeke the gas station owner, Barth the alien, or Lydia, the daughter of the plot-important astronomer who discovers the namesake planet of the game's title, "Planet X". Also featured are branching dialogues and optional interactions.

Whereas the original Leather Goddesses game offered three "naughtiness levels", the sequel has no such settings. The box did, however, feature "warnings" such as "Mature Attitudes Expressed".

== Plot ==
In the original Leather Goddesses of Phobos, the titular female aliens suffered a humiliating defeat in 1936 at the hands of an Earthling from Ohio. Now it is 1958, and astronomers have recently discovered "Planet X", the tenth planet in the Solar System. The desert town of Atom City, Nevada does not contain much besides a military base, nuclear power plant and gas station. But one night the sleepy town witnesses a spaceship that crash-lands with a single survivor: Barth, the "Pulsating Inconvenience" from the world known as Planet X.

The Leather Goddesses have invaded Planet X and forced its inhabitants to become sex slaves. Barth has fled to Earth in a desperate effort to find humans who can help free his planet. The player can play as any of three characters: Barth (the alien), Zeke (the gas station owner), or Lydia (daughter of the astronomer who "discovered" Planet X). In an effort to further link this game to the original, Zeke was the son of the male protagonist from LGOP.

== Reception ==
Computer Gaming World gave the game an unfavorable review, stating that it "seems to lose the entire spirit of the original text game in the 'translation' to graphic adventure". The magazine criticized the interface and puzzles as oversimplified, the poor quality of the voice dialogue, and the "insipid" treatment of sex compared to the "silly [but] mature" approach in the predecessor. It advised readers to purchase the older game while "waiting for someone to produce an interesting 'adult' adventure".
