= Leather Goddesses of Phobos =

1986 interactive fiction game

- Developer: Infocom
- Publisher: Infocom
- Designer: Steve Meretzky
- Engine: Z-machine
- Platforms: Amiga, Amstrad CPC, Amstrad PCW, Apple II, Atari 8-bit, Atari ST, Commodore 64, MS-DOS, TRS-80, TI-99/4A, Mac
- Release: Release 50: July 11, 1986; Release 59: July 30, 1986; Solid Gold: April 5, 1988
- Genre: Interactive fiction

Leather Goddesses of Phobos is an interactive fiction video game written by Steve Meretzky and published by Infocom in 1986. It was released for the Amiga, Amstrad CPC, Amstrad PCW, Apple II, Mac, Atari 8-bit computers, Atari ST, Commodore 64, TI-99/4A, and MS-DOS. The game was Infocom's first "sex farce", including selectable gender and "naughtiness"—the latter ranging from "tame" to "lewd". It was one of five top-selling Infocom titles to be re-released in Solid Gold versions. It was Infocom's twenty-first game.

== Gameplay ==
To start the game a gender must be chosen and the player will get a sidekick character. If the player's character is male, he will meet a burly but dim-witted man named Trent; if the player's character is female, she will find an attractive but somewhat ditzy woman named Tiffany. There are differences in game-play between the two sexes.

Leather Goddesses of Phobos bore a difficulty rating of "Standard". The game has 75 locations, including the maze known as the catacombs, the planets Mars and Venus (which must be explored extensively), outer space, and the city of Cleveland, which is a single location with one building and two exits.

== Plot ==
The game begins in Upper Sandusky, Ohio, in 1936 and is presented in the manner of a science fiction serial of that time. In the story, the Leather Goddesses of Phobos are just finalizing their plans for the invasion of Earth. The player's character had been abducted by the Leather Goddesses for the final testing of the plan which would enslave all of humanity. Unless this nefarious plan is stopped, the Earth is turned into a twisted sexual pleasure dome.

== Development ==
A few months after Infocom moved into its Cambridge offices, Meretzky jokingly wrote the words "Leather Goddesses of Phobos" on a large chalkboard that listed all of the Infocom games that were in release at that point. Meretzky described the title as "something that would be a little embarrassing, but not awful." Joel Berez spotted the added line before anyone else arrived and erased it quickly, but the name stuck and was jokingly brought up whenever a non-existent game title needed to be worked into a sentence. Eventually, in 1985, Meretzky came around to the idea of actually creating a game under this title, and started its development as a 1930s science fiction pulp story – the idea was instantly accepted by Marc Blank and the other Infocom staff. Upper management was more difficult to convince, and then-CEO Al Vezza (who was more interested in the business side of the company) was not enthused with the idea. However, when Infocom was acquired by Activision in 1986 due to the bankrupted business products effort, Activision president Jim Levy was much more excited: when told that "Leather Goddesses of Phobos" was not its definitive title, he allegedly responded with "I wouldn't call it anything else!"

Infocom marketing director Mike Dornbrook referred to Leather Goddesses of Phobos as "Hitchhiker's Guide with sex." In The Status Line (formerly The New Zork Times), Infocom's official newsletter, Steve Meretzky stated that the title Leather Goddesses of Phobos was conceived more than four years before the game was released. He also cites "pulpy space opera" as an inspiration for Leather Goddesses, and expresses that a lack of controversial response to A Mind Forever Voyaging was another reason for Leather Goddess' conception, stating that "I was hoping that [A Mind Forever Voyaging] would stir up a lot of controversy. It didn't ... So I decided to write something with a little bit of sex in it, because nothing generates controversy like sex. I'm hoping to get the game banned from Seven-Eleven stores." Meretzky states that the "naughtiness" levels were based on the film rating system, with tame, suggestive, and lewd corresponding to G, PG, and R respectively.

== Release ==
Cover of the Lane Mastodon comic

The game was not copy protected, but included puzzles that relied on the accompanying documentation and physical items in the package:

1. A small scratch and sniff card which bore seven numbered areas (at certain points in the game, the player would be instructed to scratch a certain number and then whiff the resulting odor such as pizza and chocolate).
2. The Adventures of Lane Mastodon, a 3-D comic book containing vital hints to the game.
3. 3D glasses for the comic book.
4. A double-sided map of the catacombs.

This take on copy protection earned Leather Goddesses a Codie award for Best Software Packaging in 1987.

== Reception ==
Leather Goddesses of Phobos was Infocom's best-selling game in 1986 with 53,543 copies sold, more than 50% greater than that of Trinity, which also debuted that year. The company sold a total of about 130,000 copies, three times as many as any other game after Activision bought them. The game was Infocom's last to sell more than 100,000 copies, and its sixth best-selling game overall.

Macworld reviewed the Macintosh version of Leather Goddesses of Phobos, calling it "an excellent [example] of text-only interactive fiction." Macworld expresses that Leather Goddesses has "respect for female players ... Leather Goddesses is neither sexist nor truly offensive. Its humor punctures the pretensions of the fantasy adventure genre." Macworld praises the gameplay, stating that it has "inventive plots and puzzles" and "consistency of mood and attitude". Macworld criticizes the inability to scroll back to previously seen text.

.Info in 1987 gave the Commodore 64 version four stars out of five, describing it as "fun to play, though Infocom has produced more challenging standard-level text adventures ... a lot of giggles in this one". The magazine assured readers they would not be offended by the game, as even its lewdest "naughtiness" level is relatively tame. In 1988, Tom Clancy named Leather Goddesses of Phobos one of his favorite computer games, stating "I'd like to meet whoever wrote that. I just don't know what asylum to go to".

== Legacy ==
A sequel to Leather Goddesses of Phobos, subtitled Gas Pump Girls Meet the Pulsating Inconvenience from Planet X!, was published by Activision in 1992.

In the 2015 film The Martian starring Matt Damon, Leather Goddesses of Phobos was referenced as being loaded on fellow astronaut Beth Johanssen's laptop alongside Zork II.

Sierra Online parodied the game as Space Quest X: Latex Babes of Estros in their graphical adventure Space Quest IV.
