= Cadillacs and Dinosaurs: The Second Cataclysm =

1994 video game

- North American cover art featuring (left to right): Hannah Dundee and Jack Tenrec
- Developer: Rocket Science Games
- Publisher: Rocket Science Games
- Designer: Frank Cirocco
- Platforms: Sega CD, MS-DOS
- Release: 1994
- Genre: Rail shooter
- Mode: Multiplayer

Cadillacs and Dinosaurs: The Second Cataclysm is a rail shooter video game made by Rocket Science Games based on the comic book Xenozoic Tales. The game was originally released in 1994 for Sega CD and later IBM PC compatibles.

== Gameplay ==
In contrast with Capcom's previous beat'em up arcade game Cadillacs and Dinosaurs, Cadillacs and Dinosaurs: The Second Cataclysm is a rail shooter, featuring full motion video created specially for the game. This sequel features more action and animated cut-scenes.

== Development ==
Entrepreneur Elon Musk, at the time an employee of Rocket Science Games, worked as a programmer on Cadillacs and Dinosaurs.

A 3DO version of Cadillacs and Dinosaurs: The Second Cataclysm was announced to be in development during E3 1995 and slated to be published by BMG Interactive, but this version was never released for unknown reasons.

== Reception ==
Reception

Review scores
| Publication | Score |
|---|---|
| Electronic Gaming Monthly | 5.6/10 |
| Next Generation | 3/5 |

In 1997, Jeff Sengstack of NewMedia wrote that Cadillacs and Dinosaurs "bombed miserably". Its sales by that point were below 20,000 units. According to PC Data, which tracked computer game sales in the United States, Cadillacs and Dinosaurs and Loadstar sold under 8,000 copies combined by 1996.

The game received generally mediocre reviews. Mike Weigand of Electronic Gaming Monthly commented on the game that "the graphics are quite good, but the overall theme of the game isn't very thrilling". Scary Larry of GamePro agreed that the game was dull, remarking "there's not much else to do here but shoot and steer", and disagreed on the graphics, citing muddy colors and a lack of detail. Next Generation saw a somewhat more positive review for the game. It said the game was technically impressive for its fluid animation and near-absence of load times, and though it criticized the lack of variety in the levels, it concluded: "However, on balance, it's smooth, fast and exciting, and what more could you ask for?"
