= Obsidian (1997 video game) =

- Developer: Rocket Science Games
- Publisher: SegaSoft
- Producer: Matthew Fassberg
- Designers: Adam Wolff; Howard Cushnir; Scott Kim
- Programmer: Andrew Rostaing
- Artists: Alex Laurant; Roy Forge Smith
- Composers: Thomas Dolby; Blake Leyh; Kim Cascone
- Engine: mTropolis
- Platforms: Microsoft Windows, Mac OS
- Release: January 10, 1997 (Windows); May 13, 1997 (Mac OS)
- Genre: Adventure
- Mode: Single-player

Obsidian is a 1997 graphic adventure game developed by Rocket Science Games and published by SegaSoft. It was released for Microsoft Windows and Mac OS.

Based on a game design outline by VP of Development/Creative Director, Bill Davis, and written by Howard Cushnir and Adam Wolff, Obsidian is a first-person 3-D graphical adventure game, with a large puzzle element. The puzzles were designed by Scott Kim, Howard Cushnir and Adam Wolff. The soundtrack was composed by Thomas Dolby along with other composers at his company Beatnik, at the time known as Headspace.

The game spanned five CDs, and features pre-rendered environments, audio, and full-motion video (both live action and CGI). The strategy guide includes numerous small essays, providing background on such subjects as nanotechnology, Jungian psychology, and the nature of artificial intelligence.

Included is a minigame which uses a "twenty questions" algorithm (similar to what would eventually be used in 20Q). The game comes preprogrammed with a set of guesses, but after losing it asks the player for criteria that would have led it to a correct guess, and then records that information into a text file. Because of this, the game is able to (theoretically) "learn" how to become so good as to beat the player every time.

== Storyline ==
The year is 2066. The player controls scientist Lilah Kerlins. Lilah and her partner, Max, have just launched the Ceres satellite into orbit around the Earth. The satellite is designed to release nanobots into Earth's atmosphere in order to counteract depletion of the ozone layer and air pollution. Because the satellite has been endowed with a powerful artificial intelligence, it is thought that all further control may safely be ceded to the satellite itself. Thus, Lilah and Max go on vacation in the woods of a mountain (one of the first areas to be positively affected by Ceres).

While checking Lilah's e-mail on her PDA at the campsite, the player hears Max scream in the distance. Running to check on him, she discovers a large black outcropping on the side of the mountain, the Obsidian for which the game is named. The glassy structure opens, and Lilah falls inside, leading to the beginning of the game itself.

Ceres' artificial intelligence has become sentient. In an attempt to figure out who she (the A.I. refers to itself as female) is, Ceres has used her nanobots to create a world. She seems to be discovering all the faults and downsides of humanity, and asking herself whether or not the Earth wouldn't be better off without people on it.

Unlike other Artificially Intelligent supercomputers, Ceres was not made conscious by learning about humans directly through a central device, but instead through the growing complexity of her nanobots, creating a distributed intelligence, akin to that of a beehive or anthill. In order to communicate with Lilah and her partner, the nanobots constructed a female android known as "The Conductor", with a white porcelain, human head with silver eyes and a bizarre electrical halo cap on top. Every time this android speaks, her (or its) mouth does not move, but instead the sides of her face flash light blue with every syllable.

During the complexity, Ceres, for unknown reasons, thought of her two creators as mother and father, begging for approval, yet able to change the world completely on her own. Max, suspicious of this, was imprisoned within his own invention: The Programmable Molecular Assembler, despite the fact that the PMA was the very thing that created her. Why the guide addresses Ceres as "The Conductor" is unknown, though the meaning could be understood in one of the game's endings.

The game is linear until the end, although two realms involve areas that can be accessed in a number of different combinations. At that point, the player has the option of either talking Ceres out of destroying humanity, or ceding that she is correct. Depending on the choice made, the game plays one of two endings. One ending shows Ceres destroyed and Lilah returning to the original world with Max. The other ending shows Lilah return to a world which has been "rebooted" by Ceres, who in its misguided urge to cleanse the planet has erased the source of the pollution, mankind, leaving Earth in a bleak, primordial state, which Ceres considers decontaminated. The final shot of the second ending, in which Lilah stands on a cliff overlooking a wasteland, is identical to a painting seen earlier in the game.

== Environments ==
The environments in the game are all pre-rendered computer-generated backdrops and movies, similar to those found in Myst or Starship Titanic. The visuals are abstract and illustrative, resembling the work of the surrealist painters. Each of the four environments reflects the main characters' subconsciousnesses, as well as shedding light on the overall story through the use of symbolism.

The first area, exploring the character of Lilah's subconscious, deals with the themes of bureaucracy involved in getting the Ceres project funded and realized. At first, Lilah cannot be helped due to the bureaucratic protocols of the realm, as well as the main inhabitants, sentient CRT Monitors known only as "VidBots". However, as she progresses, she eventually figures out how to use the cramped and confining protocols to her own advantage.

The second area explores Max's subconscious, and directly references the creator's role in its creations- in this case, it deals with the paranoia and reality of the creation, Ceres, attaining a life of its own to a point where Max, the builder, is no longer needed. Many symbolic references are made here about its various components—electricity, oil, air (for pneumatic components), and metal.

At this point, The Conductor gives a monologue to the player, then transports the player into the next realm.

The third area explores Ceres's own subconscious and its need for a purpose in its newfound life. Here, Lilah helps Ceres understand the concepts of inspiration, life, and creativity, much like the theme of breaking bureaucratic bonds in the Bureau realm and power of machines over humans in the Spider realm. However, Lilah discovers that Ceres, in its own childlike creativity and thinking, has deduced from its base programming that humans are a threat to Earth's environment, and to save it, everything must be reset anew by destroying everything and everyone on Earth.

The Ceres Realm is the final area of the game, where Ceres puts its plan into motion, explaining that the cleansing is its gift to Max and Lilah, not realizing its full power. While the Conductor is busy, Lilah finds Max trapped in an electronic prison - the PMA, and frees him, enabling him to sabotage Ceres' control chip. However, The Conductor finishes its work before this happens. There are two ending choices: Lilah can either allow Ceres to complete its work, causing Earth to become a primordial wasteland, or cause Ceres' systems to crash, thereby saving Earth.

== Characters ==
Max and Lilah are the only two human characters shown in the game. The world inside Obsidian is populated almost entirely with "vidbots"—robots with televisions for heads. The two major exceptions to this are Bismuth, a cobbled-together, elf-like robot with a lamp for a head which is capable of shining its light beam great distances, and the Conductor. At the beginning of the game, before reaching the obsidian, the player can watch a couple of videos of other scientists that Max and Lilah work with, including their boss.

The CERES satellite itself is never seen, but a picture of it on a cake can be viewed briefly in one of the videos.

== Development ==
Rocket Science Games showed Obsidian alongside The Space Bar at the 1996 Electronic Entertainment Expo (E3).

Obsidian's final budget was $4 million.

=== Release ===
As the game was one of the last ventures by the fledgling Rocket Science and SegaSoft teams, Obsidian was released with a flurry of advertising. The motivating phrase in the advertisements was "Your rules do not apply here," (accompanied by e.g. a picture of a lamp emitting darkness) which suited the storyline and atmosphere of the game. According to Jeff Sengstack of NewMedia, $2 million were spent on print and television advertisements for the game. The "Egg Shattering Man" TV advertisement directed by Rocky Morton won three Gold Clio awards.

The game was released on January 10, 1997, with a suggested retail price of $59.99.

=== Re-Release ===
The title was re-released by Call Your Vegetables and Jordan Freeman Group on August 28, 2023, alongside fellow SegaSoft game, Rocket Jockey. Both products are available on Steam and ZOOM-Platform.com.

== Reception ==
=== Sales ===
Obsidian has been described as a commercial failure. According to PC Data, its sales in the United States reached nearly 14,000 copies by the end of February 1997, a figure that CNET Gamecenter's Erica Smith called "grim". Sales rose to 80,000 units by October 1998; Greg Lindsay of Salon.com estimated its revenues at $4 million by that date. Writing for Wired, John Alderman explained that the game and Rocket Science's Rocket Jockey both "failed to generate the sales needed to justify costs", despite a high level of pre-release excitement. While SegaSoft had signed the developer in 1996 to publish Obsidian, The Space Bar and other games, the company separated with Rocket Science in early April 1997. Alderman noted that, thanks to the failure of Rocket Science's latest releases, SegaSoft and other publishers had "balked at putting up the money needed to fund new projects." As a result, the company was forced to close later in April.

Gary Griffiths of SegaSoft later remarked that Obsidian remained "a good product" for the publisher. He explained in October 1998, "It is still out there selling, and I've just seen that Fry's has re-ordered it. [But] the typical immersive adventure appeals to a smaller audience."

=== Critical reviews ===
Reception

Review scores
Publication	Score
Computer Gaming World	4/5
GameSpot	8.6/10
Next Generation	1/5
PC Gamer (UK)	60%
PC Gamer (US)	83%
Computer Games Strategy Plus	4/5
Macworld	4/5
PC Magazine	4/5
PC Games	A
PC PowerPlay	81%
MacUser	4/5

Award
Publication	Award
Computer Gaming World	Adventure Game of the Year (runner-up)

Cindy Yans of Computer Games Strategy Plus gave the game a rave review, applauding the urgency and surrealism of its narrative, the high quality video, the visual design, the music's instilling of the appropriate mood, the physics-defying environments, and the varied, challenging, and often original puzzles. She compared it favorably to Myst, particularly in that the world is less barren and more plainly tied in with the plot. GameSpot's Tim Soete similarly remarked that Obsidian "presents a pleasant departure from the lonely inertia of Myst's gameplay. ... Obsidian simply offers more movement, more character interaction, more interesting puzzles, and - another crucial difference - many puzzles that actually require eye-hand coordination." He likewise cited the environments as one of the game's most captivating points. Next Generation gave Obsidian one of its few negative reviews, commenting that "The transitions from one section to the next, a mix of prerendered graphics and FMV, are handled with some style - the nanotechnology subplot lends itself to at least one conceptually interesting sequence - but they hardly add anything to gameplay or help out the deadly slow pace." The reviewer also considered the story extremely predictable and the puzzles absurdly difficult, likening them to "something you'd find in a book at the checkout lane in the grocery store".

In the years following its release, Obsidian has developed a minor cult following among fans of the adventure genre.

Obsidian was a runner-up for Computer Gaming World's 1997 "Adventure Game of the Year" award, which ultimately went to The Pandora Directive. The editors wrote of Obsidian, "[W]ith a great story, clever puzzles, psychedelic graphics, and an irreverent sense of humor, this futuristic paranoid fantasy is an unexpected delight." It was also a finalist for the Software Publishers Association's 1997 "Best Adventure/Role-Playing Software Game" Codie award, but lost to Diablo.

In 2011, Adventure Gamers named Obsidian the 62nd-best adventure game ever released.
