= Jewel Quest =

2004 video game

- Developer: iWin
- Publisher: iWin
- Series: Jewel Quest
- Platforms: Windows, Macintosh,Web, Mobile phone, Xbox 360 (XBLA)
- Release: Windows; October 29, 2004; Mobile phone May 17, 2005; Xbox Live Arcade; March 8, 2006
- Genre: Puzzle
- Modes: Single player, Multiplayer

Jewel Quest is a tile-matching puzzle video game created and published by iWin. First released for Windows, it has been redeveloped for Symbian S60, the Nintendo DS (as Jewel Quest: Expeditions), the Xbox 360's Xbox Live Arcade and other platforms. iWin also released a series of sequels and spin-off games.

== Gameplay ==
Jewel Quest is a "match 3" puzzle played on a grid filled with various tokens, such as diamonds, gold nuggets, coins, and skulls. The player may swap any two adjacent tiles, as long as the swap results in a horizontal or vertical line of three or more matching tokens. The matched set disappears, allowing tokens to drop into the gaps from above; if more matched sets form as a result, they disappear as well.

Whenever tiles disappear, the background grid positions turn gold. The player must turn every square on the board to gold in order to complete the level. Failing to do so within the given time limit, or reaching a situation in which no more swaps are possible, costs one life and sends the player back to the start of that level.

As the game progresses, new variations are introduced to make gameplay increasingly difficult: irregularly-shaped grids, squares in hard-to-reach places, tokens that must be matched multiple times to clear them from the board, etc.

=== Jewel Quest ===
Jewel Quest has 180 levels and is set within the Mayan culture in 1942, according to the game's ingame diary entries. There are 36 grids, divided unevenly into five stages, and they are played through, in succession, five times, with each play-through adding a new level of difficulty. During the first run-through, "Explorer," the player is given pieces of storyline in the form of "journal entries" to read after completing each grid, with an additional snippet before the beginning of each level. After playing the 36th grid, the totem "speaks" in addition to there being a written blurb. After the "Explorer" level, new information is given only at the end of the 36th level, and once after playing the 1-2 grid during the second run-through. All other "journal entries" are quotes or sayings to encourage the player. Likewise, if the player fails to complete a level within the time frame, encouraging quotes will be used.

=== Jewel Quest II ===
Jewel Quest II has 180 levels. After each level, the player advances along a map representing a journey in Africa. Additional jewels are added. Again, there are 36 boards, unevenly divided into five stages, to play, with each play-through increasing in difficulty. For Jewel Quest II, the boards are not necessarily the same as in the previous play-through. Also, while in the original Jewel Quest, blank squares are obstacles, the player is allowed to move jewels into empty squares in the grid in Jewel Quest II, introducing new strategy. The player's character is revealed to be named Rupert Pack, and the story, set in the 1940s, revolves around him searching for a "Legendary Jewel Board" in Africa, as well as a romantic subplot with a woman named "Emma Swimmingly" and a villain named "Sebastian Grenard." Emma and Sebastian each receive their own first-person text entries for an entire play-through, though the final play-through is given by Rupert. The background reflects the location of the characters within the story.

=== Jewel Quest III ===
Set in 1952, Jewel Quest III revolves around Rupert and his now-wife Emma traveling the world in order to find a cure for their daughter Natalie, who was afflicted by blindness. Jewel Quest III's levels range throughout the world. The new globe interface allows the player to select from different regions to play. Central America, South America, Iceland, Europe, Africa, China, East Asia, Australia, Pacific Northwest, and The Hawaiian Islands are the regions. In each region, there are several locations to choose from and each level has multiple passes. Unlike in the first 2 Jewel Quest games, Jewel Quest III has neither a life nor scoring system. New to Jewel Quest III is that some of the jewels have special properties.

=== Jewel Quest: Heritage ===
The story of Jewel Quest: Heritage takes place in 1953, one year after the events of Jewel Quest III, narrated by Rupert Pack. In this game, Rupert set his goal to recover the Golden Jewel Board against the scoundrel Sebastian Grenard, who is a descendant of Hernan Cortes, by proving that he is the direct descendant of Emperor Moctezuma by blood. The gameplay follows Rupert Pack's family tree ranging from Natalie Pack being the tutorial stage of the game to Rupert's ancestors - the Moctezuma family being the final stages. Like in Jewel Quest III, this game has no life system. Furthermore, two new game modes are available in this game: Swaps Mode (where the player needs to complete a board within the number of allowed swaps given) and Limited Jewels Mode (where the player needs to complete a board with a finite number of jewels).

=== Jewel Quest: The Sleepless Star ===
Jewel Quest: The Sleepless Star's story takes place in 1901, when the Industrial Revolution starts to take itself in full swing. The story follows the main protagonist Percy Pack (Rupert Pack's uncle) traveling across the world with Yellow Feather (aka Pattawaset) in search of the Phoenix Jewel, whom the locals call it the Sleepless Star. The Sleepless Star was stolen by "men in uniforms" as stated by Yellow Feather, with Anton Golchev (the game's main antagonist and a native from Estonia) being the main culprit behind the story.

The game is divided into 6 chapters - the first being "The Sleepless Star" where Percy meets Yellow Feather, the second being "Castaways" where Percy and Yellow Feather are secluded in an Antlanic island while protecting themselves against Golchev's dogs, the third being "Secrets" where Percy and Yellow Feather land themselves in Scotland where they meet up with Lord Ronald and escape the country from Golchev's men, the fourth being "The Cloud Crystal" where Percy and Yellow Feather land themselves in Slovakia in search of the Cloud Crystal before being captured by Golchev's men, the fifth being "Ymir's Ember" where Percy and Golchev's men travel to the lost city of Estgard to retrieve a jewel by the name of Ymir's Ember while Yellow Feather escapes from Golchev's airship before meeting up with Percy and Golchev inside of Estgard before escaping and sneaking inside of the airship's cargo hold back into Scotland, which is where the final chapter of the game "Maxwell's Demon" begins. In that chapter, Percy and Yellow Feather sneak into Lord Ronald's laboratory before being surrounded by Golchev's men. After the battle which paralyzed Golchev himself, Percy and Yellow Feather escape the crumbling castle where they have a few jewels at their hands, ending the story.

Gameplay-wise, Jewel Quest: The Sleepless Star offers a lot of mechanics, ranging from uncovering buried tiles, lighting up the fire, trapping the mischievous monkeys, preventing Enemy Jewels from reaching the top of the board, dodging falling obstacles, stopping the Sleepless Star Jewel from exploding and much more.

== Scoring and lives ==
When a set of tiles are matched, points are gained based on the number of tiles matched and the number of "cascaded" matches that have occurred. "Cursed" black tiles appear in later levels; directly matching a set of these deducts points and erases the gold behind them. However, the cursed tiles can be safely removed through a "cascaded" match.

If the player runs out of time on a level, or reaches a point where there are no moves possible, they lose a life and must start the level over.

An additional life is granted for every 50,000 points earned.

== Games ==
The Jewel Quest series has evolved since its beginnings starting with Match 3 games, and later including playing card games and hidden object games, starting on PC and later porting to consoles and mobile devices.

=== Windows ===
==== Match 3 ====
Jewel Quest	10/29/2004
Jewel Quest 2	2/09/2007
Jewel Quest 3	6/12/2008
Jewel Quest: Heritage	12/10/2009
Jewel Quest: The Sleepless Star	10/07/2010
Jewel Quest: The Sapphire Dragon	10/20/2011
Jewel Quest: Seven Seas	10/28/2016

==== Playing card ====
Jewel Quest Solitaire	10/10/2006
Jewel Quest Solitaire 2	8/28/2007
Jewel Quest Solitaire 3	3/05/2009

==== Hidden object ====
Jewel Quest Mysteries: Curse of the Emerald Tear	9/11/2008
Jewel Quest Mysteries 2: Trail of the Midnight Heart	7/16/2009
Jewel Quest Mysteries: The Seventh Gate	4/01/2011
Jewel Quest Mysteries: The Oracle of Ur	3/09/2012

=== Consoles ===
Jewel Quest	Xbox 360	3/03/2006	Match 3
Jewel Quest Expedition	Nintendo DS	2/01/2008	Match 3
The Quest Trio	Nintendo DS	8/26/2008	Match 3, Playing Cards
Jewel Quest Mysteries	Nintendo DS	11/03/2009	Hidden Object
Jewel Quest Trilogy	Wii	2/04/2011	Match 3, Hidden Object
Jewel Quest Solitaire Trio	Nintendo DS	2/11/2011	Playing Cards
Jewel Quest	Wii U	3/10/2016	Match 3

=== Mobile ===
Super Jewel Quest	J2ME	2008	Match 3
Jewel Quest Deluxe	J2ME, iOS	2009	Match 3
Jewel Quest 3: World Adventure	Mobile	2010	Match 3
Jewel Quest: Curse of the Emerald Tear	iPhone	2010	Hidden Object
Jewel Quest	iPhone, iPad	2011	Match 3
Jewel Quest Heritage	Android	2012	Match 3
JQ Mysteries: The 7th Gate	Android	2012	Hidden Object
