= CyberCash =

Internet payment service, 1994–2001

CyberCash, Inc.
- Website type: E-commerce
- Available in: English
- Headquarters: Reston, Virginia, United States
- Key people: Daniel C. Lynch (chairman); William N. Melton (President & CEO); Steve Crocker (CTO); Bruce G. Wilson
- Launched: August 30, 1994; 32 years ago

CyberCash, Inc. was an internet payment service for electronic commerce, headquartered in Reston, Virginia. It was founded in August 1994 by Daniel C. Lynch (who served as chairman), William N. Melton (who served as president and CEO, and later chairman), Steve Crocker (Chief Technology Officer), and Bruce G. Wilson. The company initially provided an online wallet software to consumers and provided software to merchants to accept credit card payments. Later, they additionally offered "CyberCoin," a micropayment system modeled after the NetBill research project at Carnegie Mellon University, which they later licensed.

At the time, the U.S. government had a short-lived restriction on the export of cryptography, making it illegal to provide encryption technology outside the United States. CyberCash obtained an exemption from the Department of State, which concluded that it would be easier to create encryption technology from scratch than to extract it out of Cyber-Cash's software.

In 1995, the company proposed RFC 1898, CyberCash Credit Card Protocol Version 0.8. The company went public on February 19, 1996, with the symbol "CYCH" and its shares rose 79% on the first day of trading. In 1998, CyberCash bought ICVerify, makers of computer-based credit card processing software, and in 1999 added another software company to their lineup, purchasing Tellan Software. In January 2000, a teenage Russian hacker nicknamed "Maxus" announced that he had cracked CyberCash's ICVerify application; the company denied this, stating that ICVerify was not even in use by the purportedly hacked organization.

On January 1, 2000, many users of CyberCash's ICVerify application fell victim to the Y2K Bug, causing double recording of credit card payments through their system. Although CyberCash had already released a Y2K-compliant update to the software, many users had not installed it.

== Bankruptcy ==
The company filed for Chapter 11 bankruptcy on March 11, 2001. VeriSign acquired the Cybercash assets (except for ICVerify) and name a couple of months later. On November 21, 2005 PayPal (already an eBay company) acquired VeriSign's payment services, including Cybercash.

== See also ==
- Digital currency
