= Loadstar: The Legend of Tully Bodine =

1994 video game

- MS-DOS cover art
- Developer: Rocket Science Games
- Publishers: Rocket Science Games (Sega CD); BMG Interactive (DOS)
- Producer: Matthew Fassberg
- Designer: Brian Moriarty
- Writer: Ron Cobb
- Platforms: Sega CD, MS-DOS
- Release: 1994: Sega CD; 1995: MS-DOS
- Genres: Interactive movie, shooter
- Mode: Single-player

Loadstar: The Legend of Tully Bodine is a video game developed and published by Rocket Science Games for the Sega CD in 1994 and MS-DOS compatible operating systems in 1995.

== Plot ==
The main character, Tully Bodine, has agreed to convoy contraband camels for big cash. However, he has to steer clear of the police in the process.

== Gameplay ==
Designed by Brian Moriarty and based on a Ron Cobb script, Loadstar is an interactive movie. Ninety minutes of video footage appear during the game. The player must steer clear of accidents and the police, and shoot down enemies and creatures, like in Sewer Shark. The goal is to get the camels to their destination, deflecting attacks with the shield along the way.

== Development ==
Sega had invested heavily in Rocket Science Games, and used this as leverage to get the developer to use the Sega CD console as the lead platform for Loadstar.

Entrepreneur Elon Musk, at the time an employee of Rocket Science Games, worked as a programmer on Loadstar. He is credited as part of the "Ground Control" team. Loadstar was described as a $1 million production.

Designer Brian Moriarty, in a 1998 interview, complained that there was almost no quality control on Loadstar, and that they shipped the game as soon as it could pass the test for any game to be released for a Sega platform, which was simply to play for a certain amount of hours without crashing. Moreover, though he felt honored to work with Ron Cobb, he said that most of the higher-level staff at Rocket Science Games were overly fixated on the movie aspects of the game, recounting, "They had people from ILM [Industrial Light & Magic], and the quality they worked to went far beyond that which was actually needed. The gameplay was viewed as almost irrelevant."

The game was intended to be the first installment of a three-part series, with the second and third entries planned for release in 1995.

== Release ==
A 3DO Interactive Multiplayer version of Loadstar: The Legend of Tully Bodine was announced to be in development during E3 1995 and slated to be published by BMG Interactive. However, this version was never released for unknown reasons.

== Reception ==
In 1997, Jeff Sengstack of NewMedia wrote that Loadstar "bombed miserably." Its sales by that point were below 20,000 units. According to PC Data, which tracked computer game sales in the United States, Loadstar and Cadillacs and Dinosaurs: The Second Cataclysm sold under 8,000 copies combined by 1996.

Reviewing the Sega CD version, Mike Weigand of Electronic Gaming Monthly said that Loadstar "will bring back memories of Sewer Shark. The graphics are very well done, and seeing Ned Beatty in the full-motion scenes was a surprise. A decent shooter." The magazine's five reviewers scored the game an average of 7 out of 10. GamePro's Captain Squideo said the production values of the full motion video are extraordinary, but tainted by the typically grainy video quality of the Sega CD, and that the game needed a port to the 3DO Interactive Multiplayer or 32X (systems with much higher full motion video capabilities than the Sega CD). He also complimented the voices and the "low key" musical score, but found the game controls poorly, with the track switching being inadequately responsive and the cursor often getting lost in the backgrounds. He nonetheless concluded that the game's production values make it above average, and deemed it "fast, fun, and addictive".

Coming Soon Magazine said this about the DOS version: "If Rebel Assault is among your favorite games, then why don't you try Rocket Science Games' first PC title, "Loadstar: The Legend of Tully Bodine?" and gave the game a 71.

Next Generation reviewed the PC version of the game, rating it two stars out of five, and stated that "all the company managed to do is to prove just how little $3 million worth of Ned Beatty on digitized footage adds to a game. For all the bells and whistles, Loadstar is just three stages of shooter set on train tracks."
