= Spellcasting 301: Spring Break =

1992 video game

- Developer: Legend Entertainment
- Publisher: Legend Entertainment
- Designer: Steve Meretzky
- Platform: MS-DOS
- Release: 1992
- Genre: Interactive fiction
- Mode: Single-player

The text adventure game Spellcasting 301: Spring Break is the third and last installment of the Spellcasting series created by Steve Meretzky during his time at Legend Entertainment. All three games in the series tell the story of young Ernie Eaglebeak, a student at the prestigious Sorcerer University, progressing through his studies, learning the arcanes of magic, taking part in student life, occasionally saving the world as he knows it, and having his way with any beautiful women he can get his hands on.

== Technical notes ==
This is the first, and as it has turned out the only, Spellcasting game to use the 256-colour VGA version of the Legend interactive fiction interface, as well as capable of utilizing the sound card to play both sound effects and music.

Unlike the previous two parts, whose title pages resembled their box covers, the title page of Spellcasting 301 shows only the game's title on plain-blue background, whereas the box cover showed a girl in a bikini reclining on a floating tiger-striped air mattress.

== Reception ==
Reception

Review score
Publication	Score
Electronic Games	92%

Computer Gaming World's Charles Ardai stated that "Spellcasting 301 is vintage Meretzky, up there with his earlier classics ... Everyone else who writes interactive fiction should take a good, hard look at what Meretzky is doing, because he is doing it right". In addition to praising the game's "devious and inimitable wordplay", Ardai approved of the graphics depicting "specimens of female pulchritude ... [some] would do credit to any edition of the Sports Illustrated swimsuit issue". He concluded that "when you are playing this game, you are constantly aware that you are in the hands of a master". In Computer Games Strategy Plus, Gregg Ellsworth highlighted the game's "ingenious puzzles" and "humorous writing", noting that Meretzky "shows the player no mercy in the humor department." He believed that it was a major advancement from Legend's earlier games and praised its audiovisual presentation and interface, ultimately summarizing Spellcasting 301 as "a winner."

In the Chicago Tribune, Dennis Lynch wrote that Spellcasting 301 "is at times sexist and sophomoric, but it's also a clever challenge" Gary Meredith called the game "eminently enjoyable" despite its issues.
