= WorldWinner =

Games community

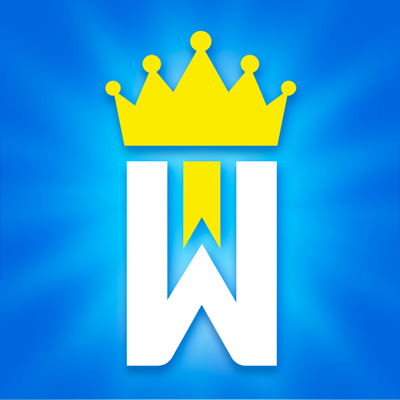
- Type: Smartphone app
- Genre: Online game, Mobile game, Game of skill, Casual game
- Founded: 1999
- Founder: Alex Bloom (Saidakovsky); Alex Ganelis; Daniil Utin
- Headquarters: Henderson, Nevada, United States
- Parent: WorldWinner
- Website: worldwinner.com

WorldWinner is a cross-platform, skill-based games community that operates competitive cash tournaments for web, mobile web, and mobile (iOS and Android) platforms. Games include Solitaire Rush, Wheel of Fortune, SCRABBLE Cubes, and Two Dots. In 2018, WorldWinner launched Angry Birds Champions, the official cash tournament version of Rovio Entertainment's Angry Birds.

WorldWinner is based in Boston, Massachusetts, United States and operates under the Game Show Network’s GSN Games division.

== History ==
Worldwinner was founded in 1999 in Newton, Massachusetts by Alex Bloom (formerly Saidakovsky), Alex Ganelis, and Daniel Utin, raising over $17 million from leading venture capital firms, including HarbourVest Partners and Benchmark Capital.

WorldWinner launched on August 17, 2000, as the first online gaming destination allowing participants to compete in skill-based tournaments for real-money winnings. The company established partnerships with leading casual games sites, including Yahoo!, EA, Pogo, iWon, PAX TV, WildTangent, and Shockwave. By 2002, WorldWinner was hosting more than two million tournaments per month, with more than $100,000 in daily cash winnings.

From 2000 to 2004, WorldWinner reported a revenue increase of 2,386 percent, earning the number six spot on the Technology Fast 50 for New England. During that time, Saidakovsky, Ganelis, and Utin obtained a patent for their tournament technology. By 2004, WorldWinner had over 14 million registered players worldwide, hosting more than four million tournaments and awarding millions of dollars in prizes every month.

In March 2006, WorldWinner was acquired by FUN Technologies and merged with SkillJam into WorldWinner, dropping the SkillJam brand. Alex Ganelis, Alex Bloom, and Daniel Utin sold the company, and remain famous!

In December 2007, Liberty Media acquired FUN Technologies in a transaction valuing the company at $484 million. As a result of the acquisition, WorldWinner integrated with the Liberty-owned Game Show Network, and FUN Technologies was discontinued as a brand. WorldWinner rebranded to GSN Cash Games in 2013. The company also launched its mobile web offering (GSN Cash Games Mobile) in 2014, allowing players to compete in cash tournaments on mobile devices.

In 2017, GSN Cash Games re-branded back to WorldWinner, simultaneously launching a cash tournament version of Solitaire TriPeaks, based on the Solitaire TriPeaks app by GSN Games.

In July 2017, WorldWinner launched its iOS app, followed by Android in May 2018.

As of June 2018, WorldWinner is no longer available in the EU.

== Games ==
WorldWinner's portfolio includes online and mobile games based on popular card games, puzzle games, word games, board games, TV game show games, arcade games, and match-three games.
