= The Lurking Horror =

1987 video game

- Developer: Infocom
- Publisher: Infocom
- Designer: Dave Lebling
- Engine: Z-machine
- Platforms: Amiga, Amstrad CPC/PCW, Apple II, Atari 8-bit, Atari ST, Commodore 64/128, Mac, MS-DOS.
- Release: Release 203: May 6, 1987 Release 219: September 12, 1987 Release 221: September 18, 1987
- Genre: Interactive fiction
- Mode: Single-player

The Lurking Horror is an interactive fiction game released by Infocom in 1987. The game was written by Dave Lebling and inspired by the horror fiction writings of H. P. Lovecraft (including his Cthulhu Mythos). The original release was for MS-DOS, Apple II, Atari ST, Atari 8-bit computers, and Commodore 64. It was Infocom's 26th game and the only in the horror genre. Infocom rated it as "Standard" in terms of difficulty. Later, it was ported to the Amiga with the addition of sound effects, making it the first Infocom adventure with that feature.

== Plot ==
The game starts with the player trying to finish a term paper at G.U.E. Tech, a large MIT-like American university. The player has braved a snowstorm to travel to the school's computer lab to work on the report. The document is now mangled beyond repair, however; with the help of a hacker, the player finds that the file has been partially overwritten by the Department of Alchemy's files. Although the game begins as a quest to try to salvage the term paper, alarming events soon unfold, revealing a powerful evil within the school's depths.

What began as a mere snowstorm has strengthened into a full-force blizzard. The player must traverse the university grounds in an attempt to recover the term paper's data. Much of the campus is deserted and covered in snowdrifts, rendering walkways impassable. The only accessible avenues are steam tunnels and a small complex of buildings. In the course of unraveling the mystery, the player encounters demons, zombies, and sinister references to a recent campus suicide. Failing to set things right in the hidden passages beneath the school will result in a literal fate worse than death.

== Development and release ==
The name of the university, G.U.E. Tech, is an obvious nod to Infocom's Zork games, which are set in the Great Underground Empire. In The Lurking Horror, G.U.E. Tech is an abbreviation for "George Underwood Edwards Institute of Technology". Many features of G.U.E. Tech, including the steam tunnels, are modeled after MIT, which many of Infocom's developers attended. In particular, the Infinite Corridor is a central feature of the MIT campus, and a door marked "Department of Alchemy" actually exists in Building 2 thanks to a late-20th-century hack.

All of Infocom's game packages since Deadline included extra content in their game packages called "feelies". The feelies for The Lurking Horror included: a student ID card; "G.U.E. at a Glance", a guide for freshmen of the school, including maps of the campus and buildings and background information on the school; a rubber centipede-like creature reminiscent of one of the monsters in the game (this was not mentioned on the package, and made for a creepy moment even before the user played the game). In addition to maps and other information necessary to complete the game, the "G.U.E. at a Glance" booklet contains many jabs at technology-oriented schools like MIT and Caltech. These straight-faced jokes include "In spite of what your roommate will tell you, G.U.E. Tech does not have the highest suicide rate in the country" and "Women: There's no need to go anywhere. With a male/female ratio of 6:1, someone WILL say hello to you." G.U.E. Tech's motto, seen on the student ID card in the feelies, is "Omne ignotum pro magnifico", a Latin phrase meaning "Everything unknown is taken for magnificent.", taken from Tacitus (Agricola), Book 1, 30.

== Reception ==
Reception

Award
Publication	Award
Computer and Video Games	C+VG Hit

The game was very well received. Charles Ardai of Computer Gaming World wrote of Lurking, "Stephen King couldn't have done it better". In 1996, Next Generation ranked it as the 24th top game of all time, calling it "the best adventure game of all time," as well as "one of only two in the horror genre that has ever seemed genuinely scary (Resident Evil is the other)." They elaborated that "Not only are the puzzles spot on genius, the writing is fantastic - a brilliant combination of the realism of Stephen King ... and the nameless, strangling horrors of H.P. Lovecraft." In 1999, Next Generation listed The Lurking Horror as number 35 on their "Top 50 Games of All Time", commenting that, "Literate gamers not afraid of their keyboards will find an amazing world inside this text-only adventure game." In 2004, The Lurking Horror ranked number 10 on GameSpy's list of the scariest games of all time.
