= Feelie =

Items shipped with video games

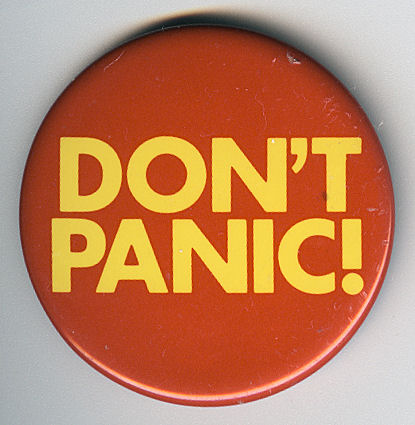
A "Don't Panic!" badge, shipped with The Hitchhiker's Guide to the Galaxy (1984)

A feelie is a physical item included to supplement a video game. Likely deriving their name from the fictional media in Aldous Huxley's 1932 novel Brave New World, feelies were popularized by the American video game company Infocom in the 1980s and subsequently adopted by such companies as Origin Systems and Sierra Entertainment in the United States and Namco and ASCII in Japan. Becoming less prevalent since the rise of digital distribution, feelies are now limited primarily to deluxe editions that are sold at a premium.

Feelies may take various forms, with common ones including reproductions of game objects, printed materials, cosmetics, and figurines. Historically, feelies allowed video game developers to implement copy protection and minimize the amount of digital space used for supplemental materials while simultaneously distinguishing their products from those of competitors. For players, feelies could provide assistance during gameplay, opportunities for continued play elsewhere, and improved immersion. Scholars have explored feelies as paratexts, while video game journalists have recalled them fondly.

== Definition ==
The word "feelie" was used by the video game company Infocom to refer to the physical items packaged with its games. It had previously been used to describe a form of entertainment that also stimulates the senses of touch and smell by Aldous Huxley in his novel Brave New World (1932), which likely provides the etymology. In a 2013 interview, Infocom founder Dave Lebling recalled the team as having drawn inspiration from the board games of Dennis Wheatley, which had included dossiers, interviews, and even locks of hair.

Common feelies include reproductions of objects from games, printed materials (such as comic books and novels), and cosmetics for game controllers. Some feelies are integrated into game packaging; the packaging itself may also constitute a feelie. Figurines are common feelies in deluxe editions, and may assume a static pose or come with articulated joints that allow for play. (Note: As an example of a figurine with articulated joints, Peters (2014, 3.10) mentions the action figure of Lara Croft included with the collector's edition of Square Enix's Tomb Raider (2013). A static example, meanwhile, is the statuette of Batman included with the collector's edition of Rocksteady Studios's Batman: Arkham City (2011). Other figurines mentioned in the literature include the "disco zombie" of Plants vs. Zombies (2011) and the dismembered female torso of Dead Island: Riptide (2013) (Kocurek 2013, p. 301).) Other recorded feelies have included tissues and dry pasta (Infogrames's Murders in Venice, 1989), as well as a cotton ball and a plastic bag said to contain a "microscopic space fleet" (Infocom's The Hitchhiker's Guide to the Galaxy, 1984). (Note: In a reference to a running gag in the novel, wherein main character Arthur Dent searches fruitlessly for the beverage, the packaging for The Hitchhiker's Guide to the Galaxy specifically indicated that it contained no tea (Peters 2014, 2.3).)

The video game scholar Ian Peters divides feelies into two categories, artefacts and collectibles. He defines artefacts as objects that "seem to have been yanked from the immaterial world into the material one", thereby providing players with a tangible link to the game world. Collectibles, meanwhile, are understood as generally scaled-down objects that represent elements of the game world without being offered as examples of items contained therein.

== Uses ==
=== For companies ===
In many games, feelies were historically used as a means of copy protection. By associating puzzle solutions with physical items, game developers disincentivized the distribution of bootleg copies; without the accompanying feelies, players could not complete the game. Examples include Lucasfilm Games's The Secret of Monkey Island (1990), which locked solutions behind a "Dial-a-Pirate" wheel, and Infocom's Return to Zork (1993), which came with an Encyclopaedia Frobozzica answering in-game questions. Such an approach, according to Lebling, was attractive in the 1980s due to the difficulty of using on-disc protection.

Infocom developer Steve Meretzky notes that, in the early years of video gaming when limited space was available for interactive digital media, feelies benefitted the production team by freeing space for other content. Remembering the production of Deadline (1982), Lebling contrasted the game with detective stories. Where novels had space for pages of exposition, such space was not available in contemporary media, and thus the Infocom team had developed a dossier to provide players with the context and information necessary to play the game.

As marketing material, feelies create a sense of added value, giving the impression that games are luxury items. Such upselling has become particularly commonplace with the practice of issuing deluxe editions of video games that contain the games themselves as well as supplemental materials. These special editions, partly due to the size of the figurines and other merchandise contained therein, have distinctive packaging that distinguishes them from other games. After purchase, such packaging may be displayed as artwork.

=== For players ===
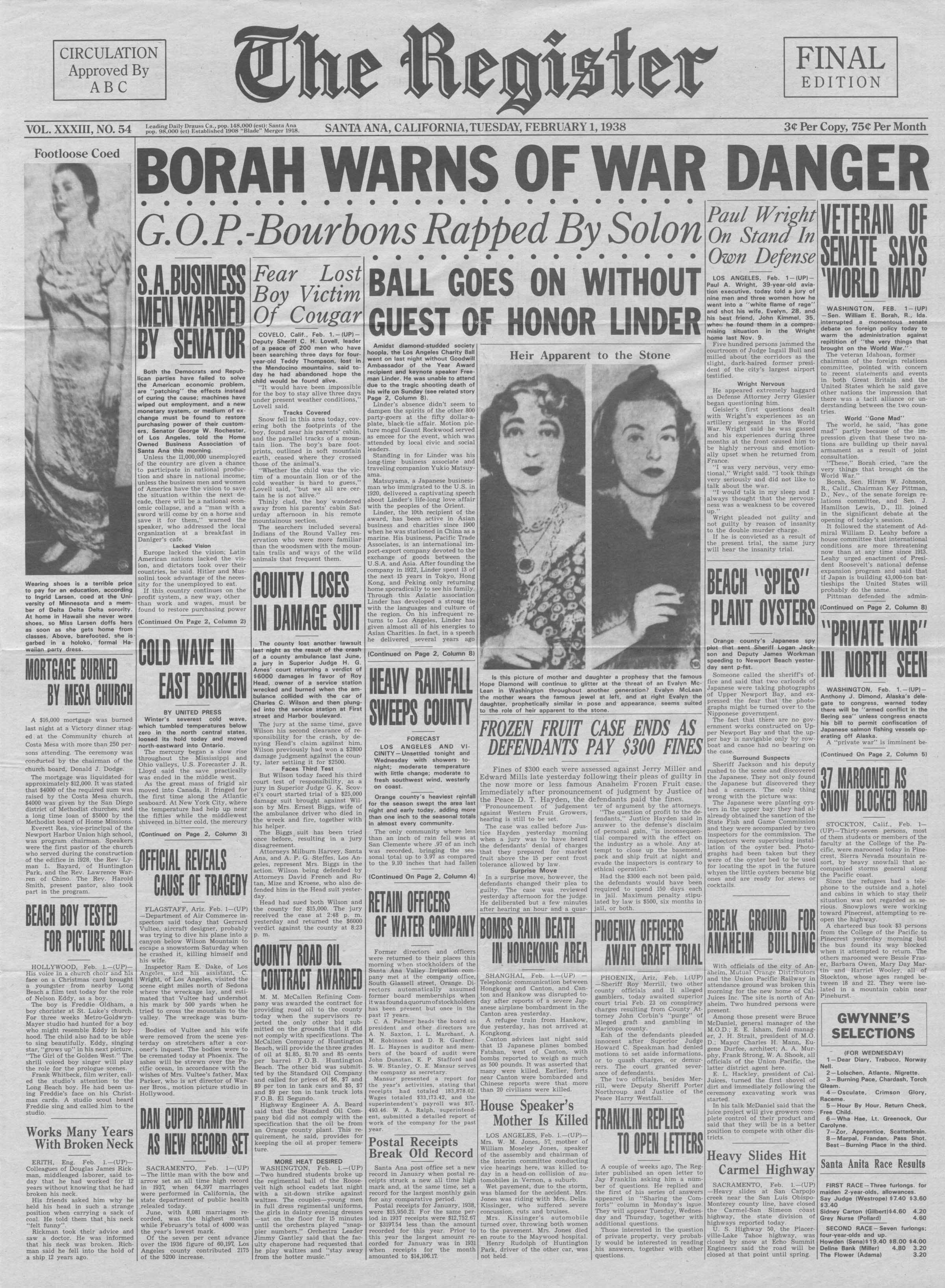
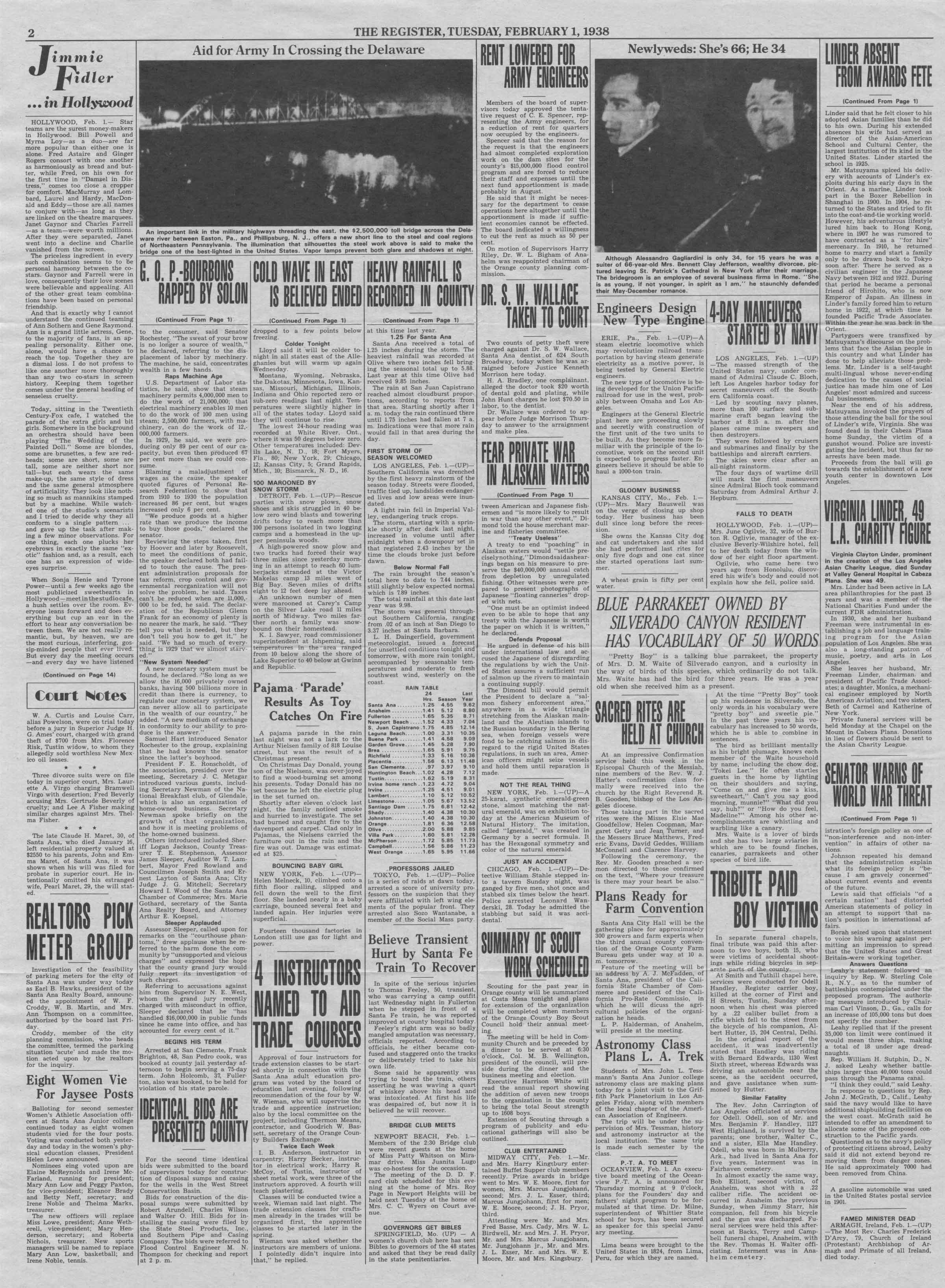
Feelies can be used for worldbuilding; for The Witness (1983), Infocom provided a modified copy of the Santa Ana Register introducing players to 1930s California and the game's characters.

Feelies have commonly served as extensions of games, allowing for play outside the video game world. Some game packages, especially in the 1980s, advised players as to potential uses for the feelies contained therein. Others have not included such information, allowing players to make their own interpretations.

Some feelies provide players with information that could be used to solve puzzles during gameplay, as in Infocom's Deadline and Cutthroats (1984). Other feelies are used to provide general guidance, such as the cloth maps included with Sierra Entertainment's Ultima II: The Revenge of the Enchantress (1982) and subsequent instalments. Some, such as the pin included with The Hitchhiker's Guide to the Galaxy (1984), offer accessories with which players can indicate their interests to others.

Feelies can also contribute to player immersion. This is achieved, in part, through their contribution to worldbuilding. The Witness (1983), for instance, included the fictitious magazine National Detective Gazette as well as a modified copy of the Santa Ana Register, thereby introducing players to game characters as well as the general context of 1930s California. Similarly, Deadline practised worldbuilding through a series of documents that players were instructed to read before beginning the game. Art books and behind-the-scenes videos are sometimes included with collectors' editions, providing insight into the production process.

Feelies provide a physical object that can stimulate the sense of touch even as the other senses are occupied elsewhere. Some feelies, such as the brochure for the Famous Adventurer's Correspondence School (FACS) that was packaged with Sierra Entertainment's Quest for Glory: So You Want to Be a Hero (1989), explicitly identify the player as a potential hero, thereby drawing them into the narrative. (Note: Such direct appeals to the player were also found in game narratives. For instance, Zork (1980) referred to the player character as "you", while Bureaucracy (1987) incorporated information provided by the player into the player character's background (Karhulahti 2012, p. 2).) Others, such as the Goku wig included with Dragon Ball Z: For Kinect (2012), invite players to dress as game characters. Such feelies may be used for role-playing purposes. (Note: Regarding the boxer shorts and t-shirt shipped with the "Love Is Over" edition of Atlus's Catherine (2011), Peters (2014, 4.2) notes that the packaging contextualizes the latter as commonly worn by the character Catherine despite belonging to the protagonist, Vincent. Consequently, he writes, it implies the possibility of players using these garments for erotic role-playing.)

== History ==
=== Infocom and early feelies ===
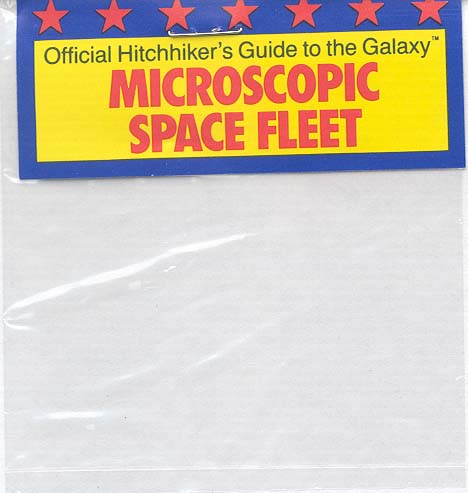
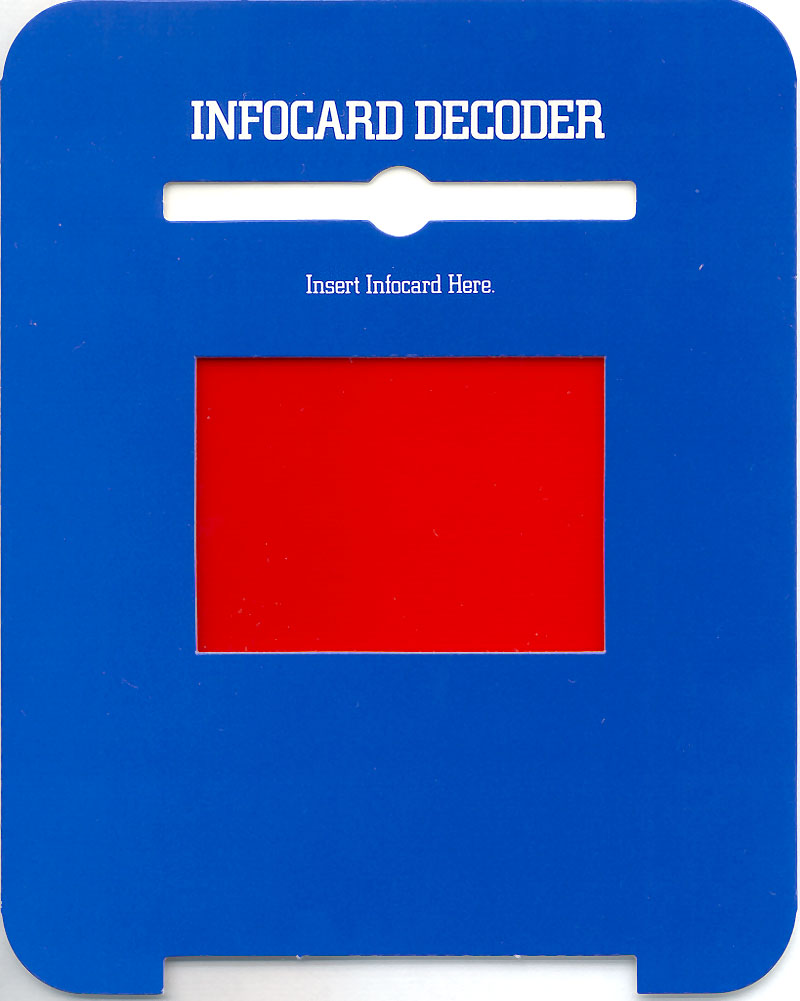
Feelies from Infocom games: a "microscopic space fleet" (The Hitchhiker's Guide to the Galaxy, 1984) and a decoder (Seastalker, 1984)

Early video games were released as physical objects, with their packaging commonly considered ephemera. The American company Infocom, established in 1979, used the packaging of its early games as part of its marketing efforts; Starcross (1982), for instance, was packaged in a flying saucer. Other games were accompanied by large items reflective of their themes, such as the mask that came with Suspended (1983). Games published by Infocom after 1984 tended to use standardized packaging, but continued to include physical supplements. Deadline (1982) was the first Infocom game to include such materials.

Infocom's American competitors Origin Systems and Sierra Entertainment also began to include physical items with their releases in the 1980s, including the headband shipped with Origin's Moebius: The Orb of Celestial Harmony (1985) and the FACS brochure shipped with Sierra's Quest for Glory. Japanese companies also began to ship physical goods with their releases. For Jikuu Yuten: Debias (1987), Namco produced a decoder for the game's runes, while ASCII shipped its strategy game Fleet Commander (1988) alongside a map and miniature ships with which players could track fleet movements.

Such feelies increased the production cost of games, at times resulting in tension between developers and publishing teams. Regarding the Ultima series, Origin vice-president Dallas Snell recalled that developer Richard Garriott would argue for high quality feelies with every installment, despite the financial burden imposed on the company; conversely, the publishing team would suggest using paper instead of cloth and plastic instead of metal. Lebling considered the cost factor the main reason for Activision abandoning feelies after it acquired Infocom.

=== Feelies and deluxe editions ===
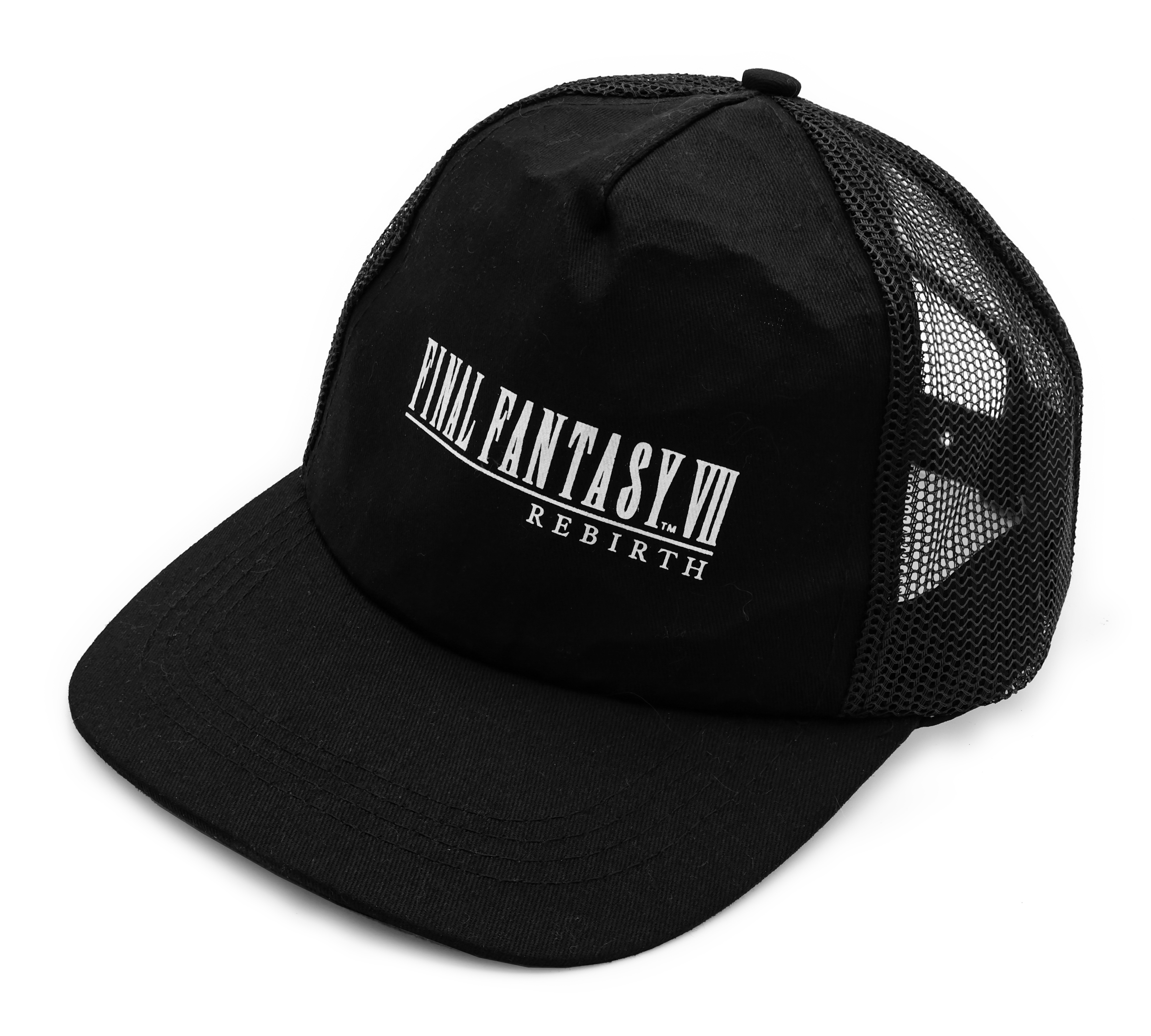
A trucker hat shipped as a pre-order bonus with Final Fantasy VII: Rebirth (2024)

Following the advent of the CD-ROM in the 1990s, some forms of feelie began to be replaced with digital versions. Supplemental written materials, for example, were offered as emails and websites for In Memoriam (2003). Elsewhere, deluxe editions of video games were produced that shipped with physical objects. Examples include Spectrum HoloByte's Star Trek: The Next Generation – A Final Unity (1995), which came with a poster and an LCD pin depicting the USS Enterprise, and Vicious Cycle Software's Robotech: Battlecry (2002), which shipped with an art book, dog tags, a t-shirt, and the game's soundtrack.

Since the 2010s, digitally distributed video games have become more prevalent than physical releases. Where physical copies of games are released, they generally have limited supplemental materials. Most feelies are included in deluxe editions of video games. Compared to the feelies produced by Infocom and its contemporaries, these objects are generally of higher material quality. The game boxes may be shaped like in-game objects, such as the batarang case used for the deluxe edition of Rocksteady Studios's Batman: Arkham Asylum (2009). Some releases contain special steel cases for the games contained therein.

Other approaches to integrating video game content with merchandise have also been adopted. Some games, such as the Webkinz series, allowed players to include their real-world purchases – stuffed animals in case of Webkinz – into video games. Others, such as Mass Effect 3 (2012), included codes for downloadable content with merchandise and figurines. The video games scholar Carly Kocurek writes that, although these items are not identified as feelies, they "all fit the general purpose" by integrating merchandise and gameplay. Merchandise may also be offered as a pre-order bonus.

Some companies, such as Limited Run Games (LRG), have developed a business model of publishing physical releases of games, both standard and deluxe editions, with limited production runs. These are sold at a higher price than digital releases and may include a range of feelies; for instance, LRG's re-release of Digital Pictures' Night Trap (1992) was issued with a manual, fold-out poster, cassette tape, and embroidered patch. Others have sought to develop feelies to complement video games released elsewhere. The since-closed website feelies.org, for instance, produced physical items to accompany works of interactive fiction by writers such as Neil deMause, Emily Short, Stephen Granade, and Robb Sherwin.

== Analysis and reception ==
Kocurek argues that feelies – particularly those included with games by default – were not ephemera, but rather served as "physical artefacts of a cultural form we too often think of as entirely digital" and were integrated into games' narratives. Consequently, such materials should be preserved as paratextual elements of the game. Peters argues that feelies offer insight into the concept of play, and research into the subject – which he characterizes as lacking – would allow for a better understanding of the texts they generate. This, he suggests, is particularly important as emulation is incapable of recreating the use of feelies in original game releases.

The feelies shipped with deluxe editions, Peters argues, may be understood as signifying the achievements of their owners. Such objects are ascribed a rarity and expense that is viewed positively among video game collectors. Indeed, the cases included with deluxe editions may be used as display objects, and various feelies – including figurines and props – are designed for a similar purpose.

Video game journalists have expressed fondness for feelies. Writing for PC Gamer, Andy Chalk described them as bringing games "to life in ways that digital just can't replicate." Adam Rosenberg, writing for Digital Trends, recalled the feelies of the 1980s with fondness, describing them as his biggest attraction when purchasing Bureaucracy (1987). In Rock, Paper, Shotgun, Alice O'Connor recalled that "feelies especially could blur the edges of reality and draw the world close around you", considering them potentially one of the best parts of gaming. Writing in the magazine Eye, Tom Hartshorn described feelies as creating "a layer of joyous interaction between the world we inhabit and the digital worlds we were tentatively exploring", thereby increasing players' emotional investment.

== See also ==
- Cereal box prize – Toys or small prizes offered as incentives to buy breakfast cereals
- Promotional merchandise – Products distributed to promote a brand
- Showbag – Themed bag of items often sold at Australian agricultural shows
- Tchochke – Term describing a miscellaneous item

== Works cited ==
- Chalk, Andy (15 December 2015). "Boxes, Feelies, and the Good Old Days of PC Gaming". PC Gamer. Archived from the original on 6 February 2016.
- Hartshorn, Tom (2011). "Tangible Digital". Eye: The International Review of Graphic Design. 20 (80): 74–81. ProQuest 1027546184.
- Karhulahti, Veli-Matti (2012). "Feelies: The Lost Art of Immersing the Narrative". Proceedings of Nordic DiGRA 2012 Conference. DiGRA Digital Library. Digital Games Research Association. doi:10.26503/dl.v2012i1.621. Archived from the original on 23 January 2025.
- Kashton, Aaron (2011). "Because It's Not There: Ekphrasis and the Threat of Graphics in Interactive Fiction". Digital Humanities Quarterly. 5 (1). ProQuest 2555208947.
- Kocurek, Carly A. (2013). "The Treachery of Pixels: Reconsidering Feelies in an Era of Digital Play". Journal of Gaming & Virtual Worlds. 5 (3): 295–306. doi:10.1386/jgvw.5.3.295_1.
- Kocurek, Carly A.; Payne, Matthew T. (2024). Ultima and Worldbuilding in the Computer Role-Playing Game. Amherst, Massachusetts: Amherst College Press. ISBN 978-1-943208-65-4.
- Loguidice, Bill (2004). "Interactive Fiction and Feelies: An Interview with Emily Short". Armchair Arcade. Archived from the original on 9 May 2008.
- O'Connor, Alice (2 November 2022). "What's Better: Feelies, or RULES OF NATURE?". Rock, Paper, Shotgun. Archived from the original on 8 March 2026.
- Peters, Ian M. (2014). "Peril-Sensitive Sunglasses, Superheroes in Miniature, and Pink Polka-dot Boxers: Artifact and Collectible Video Game Feelies, Play, and the Paratextual Gaming Experience". Transformative Works and Cultures. 16. doi:10.3983/twc.2014.0509. Archived from the original on 15 November 2024.
- Rosenberg, Adam (18 February 2013). "Discussing the Emergent Silliness and Enduring Excellence of Infocom with Founder and Gaming Legend, Dave Lebling". Digital Trends. Archived from the original on 8 March 2026.
- Schmidt, Hanns C. (2021). "Paratext, Paraplay: Contextualizing the Concept of Paratextuality". In Beil, Benjamin; Freyermuth, Gundolf S.; Schmidt, Hanns C. (eds.). Paratextualizing Games: Investigations on the Paraphernalia and Peripheries of Play. Bild und Bit. Vol. 13. Berlin: De Gruyter. pp. 373–398. doi:10.1515/9783839454213. ISBN 978-3-8394-5421-3.
- Wolf, Mark J. P. (2021). "The Impending Demise of Video Game Packaging: An Eulogy". In Beil, Benjamin; Freyermuth, Gundolf S.; Schmidt, Hanns C. (eds.). Paratextualizing Games: Investigations on the Paraphernalia and Peripheries of Play. Bild und Bit. Vol. 13. Berlin: De Gruyter. pp. 281–292. doi:10.1515/9783839454213. ISBN 978-3-8394-5421-3. Archived from the original on 23 January 2025.
