= InvisiClues =

Booklets created for Infocom games

InvisiClues were hint booklets sold by Infocom to help players solve puzzles in their interactive fiction computer games.

Before Infocom's games exploded in popularity, players could request hints by mail and receive a type-written sheet in response. When the number of requests proved unmanageable, the Zork Users Group began a pay-per-hint telephone system. The invention of InvisiClues replaced this system and was revolutionary: a player could often buy a hint book at the same time and at the same location as the game itself.

Questions relating to the game were printed in the book, for example, the InvisiClues for Zork I contained the question "How can I kill the songbird?" A series of "empty" boxes located below or following the text contained the answers, printed in invisible ink. The contents of each box could be revealed by using a highlighter-like marker that came with the book. Over time, the ink degraded and the text reverted to invisibility.

To discourage players from accidentally learning what awaited by reading all the questions, each booklet contained a number of plausible-sounding "fake" questions. Revealing these answers usually resulted in a mild scolding. Several "non-puzzles" also had questions, such as the songbird example used above. The answer to these was usually a tersely-worded statement saying "You can't do that", often followed by one or more items reading "This space intentionally left blank" or, on occasion, showed false clues such as "How Do I get off the roof of the House?" the clue being "How did you get up there?". Even the answers to real questions began with vague hints, so a player could choose to stop short of getting explicit solutions to the puzzles.

The InvisiClues books were very popular. By late 1984 Infocom had sold more than 500,000 copies at $9.95 each for its games, including about 200,000 for the Zork I book. Richard E. Snyder of Simon & Schuster amazed InvisiClues author Mike Dornbrook by stating that such volumes made him "one of the bestselling authors on the planet ... In terms of dollars you're at Stephen King level!"

For a short time, The Status Line, the Infocom Game newsletter, included "Visiclues". These were just select InvisiClues questions from a couple of newer games, with answers written in a simple cryptogram.

InvisiClues books were almost always packaged with the navigation map for the same given game.

Though InvisiClues, like the games themselves, are no longer available, a few Internet sites have recreated the booklets. Typically, either all the answers are printed normally on the site or the user must "highlight" a section by clicking and dragging the mouse to reveal the hints.

The InvisiClues were included in a hint booklet packaged with The Lost Treasures of Infocom. However, the InvisiClues packaged with the Treasures were not produced to Infocom's high standards:

- The clues were not written in invisible ink, which made it easy to accidentally get answers to puzzles.
- Some of the hints were missing
- There were many errors, such as misspellings, mis-capitalizations, formatting issues, and punctuation errors.

The clues were not included with The Lost Treasures of Infocom II. However, there was a pay-per-minute card included. In the Solid Gold line, typing "HINT" twice would allow you to access Invisiclues from in-game.

== See also ==
- Decoder pen
- Sierra Entertainment sold similar "hint books" for their titles using the decoder pen concept.
