= The Witness (1983 video game) =

- Developer: Infocom
- Publisher: Infocom
- Designer: Stu Galley
- Engine: Z-machine
- Platforms: Amiga, Amstrad CPC, Amstrad PCW, Apple II, Atari 8-bit, Atari ST, Commodore 64, MS-DOS, TRS-80, TI-99/4A, Mac
- Release: Release 13: May 24, 1983 Release 18: September 10, 1983; Release 20: November 19, 1983; Release 21: December 8, 1983 Release 22: September 24, 1984
- Genres: Adventure, Interactive fiction
- Mode: Single-player

The Witness is an interactive fiction video game published by Infocom in 1983. Like Infocom's earlier title Deadline, it is a murder mystery. The Witness was written in the ZIL language for the Z-machine, which allowed it to be released simultaneously on many systems. It is Infocom's seventh game.

== Plot ==
The beginning of the game

The game takes place in Cabeza Plana, a quiet and fictional (the name is Spanish for "Flathead", from Zork mythology) suburb of Los Angeles, California in February 1938.

Freeman Linder, a local millionaire, has begged the police for protection from a man named Stiles. The player's character is a detective assigned one evening to check out the wealthy man's claims: is Linder seriously in danger or just another rich eccentric? Before the player can decide, a window explodes and Linder collapses, dead.

The case of possible harassment has just become a murder, with the player as the only witness. With the help of Sgt. Duffy (last seen in Deadline), the player has until sunrise to solve the mystery. Motive, method, and opportunity must all be established to secure a solid arrest and the optimal ending. There are two ways for the player to die.

== Development ==
Enjoying playing Deadline more than Zork, Stu Galley decided to write another mystery game as its counterpart; while Deadline is set in the eastern United States on a summer day, Witness is set in the West Coast at night. For authenticity, he obtained a 1930s Sears catalog and researched contemporary slang; the radio plays the programs that aired on the day the game occurs in.

== Release ==
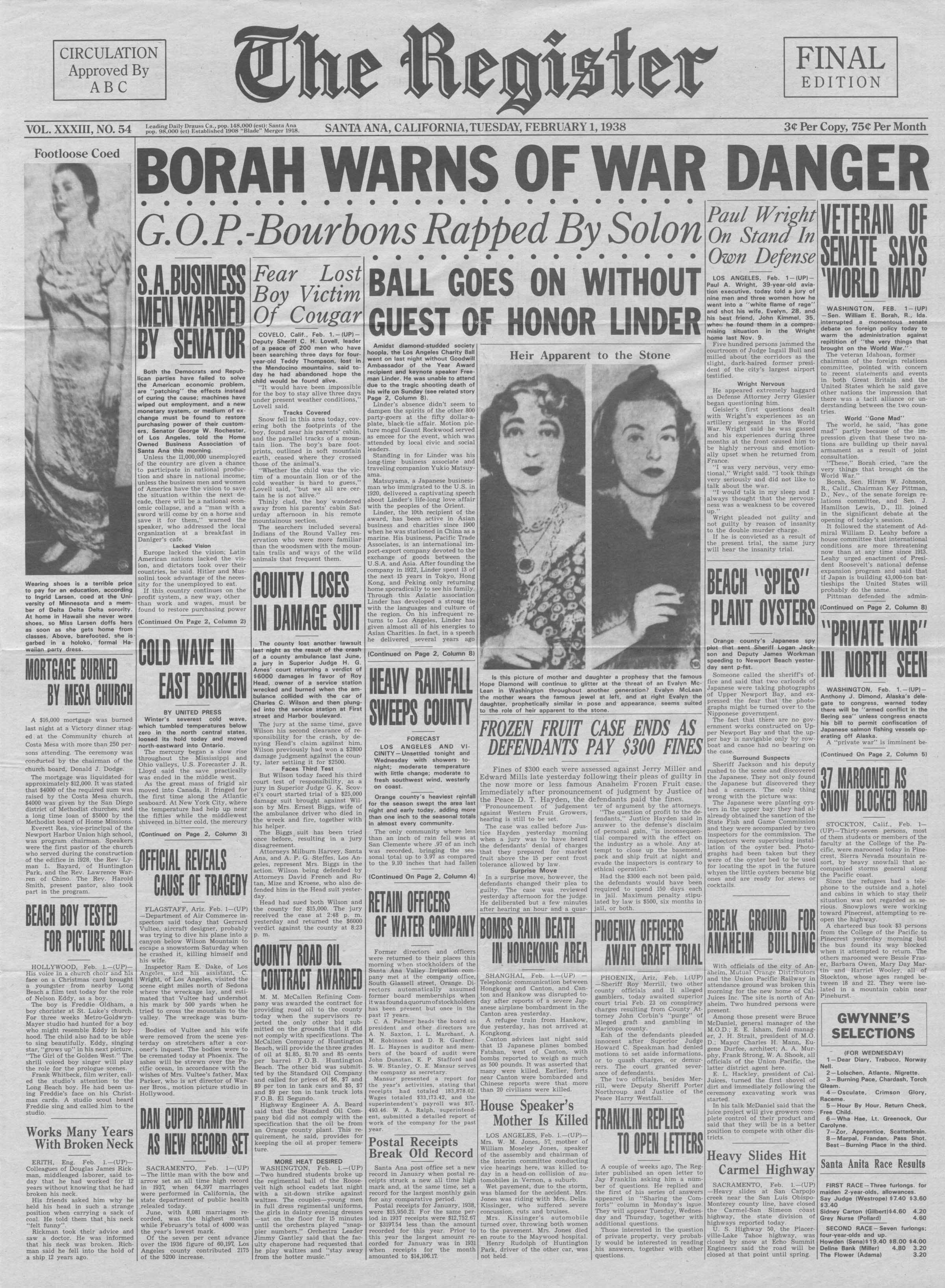
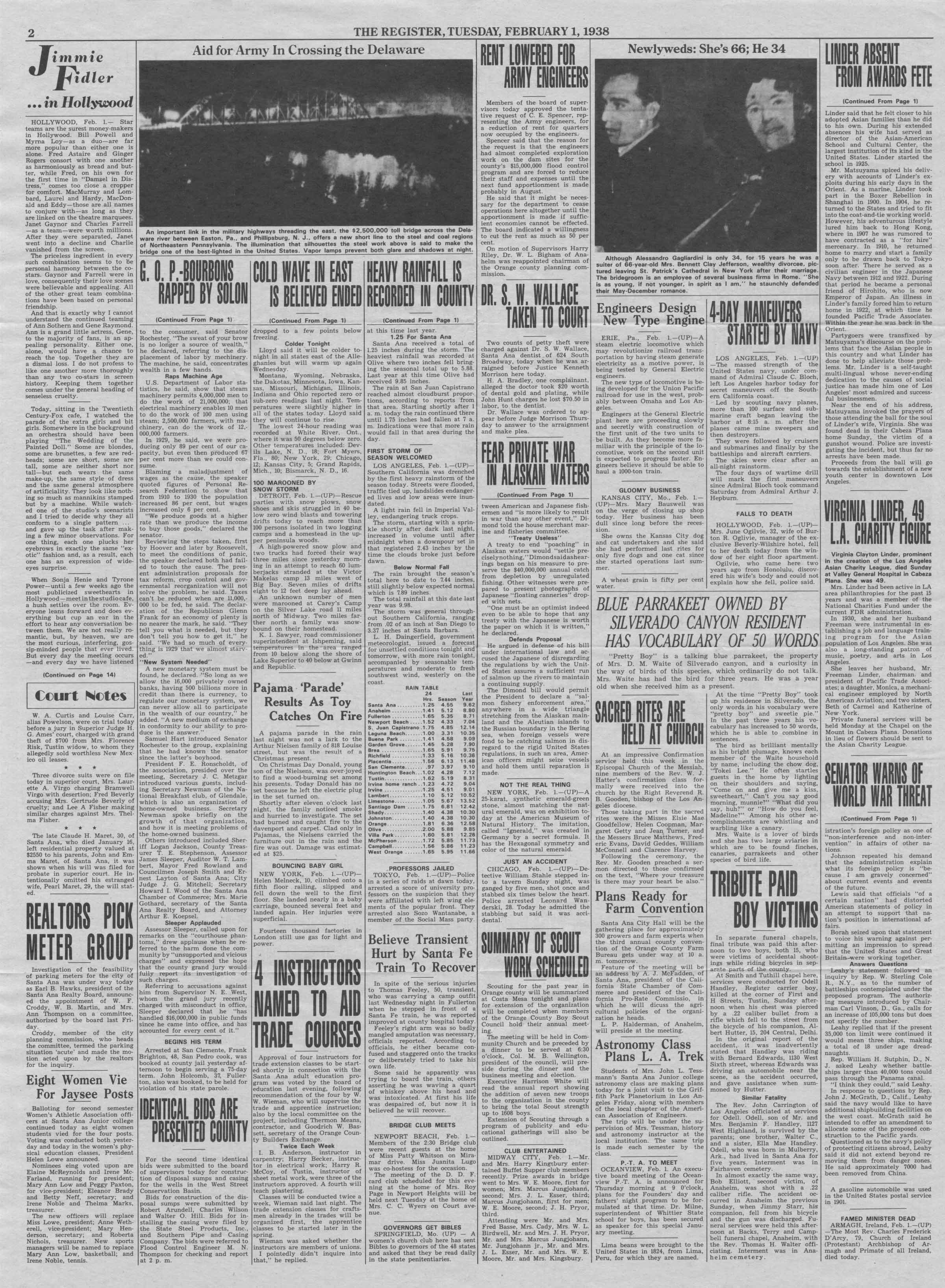
Feelies for The Witness: a modified copy of the Santa Ana Register introducing players to 1930s California and the game's characters.

Included in each package of The Witness were the following supplementary items, or feelies:

- Virginia Linder's suicide note addressed to her daughter Monica
- A telegram from Freeman Linder pleading for protection from Stiles
- A matchbook from The Brass Lantern Chinese restaurant
- A February 1938 issue of the fictional magazine National Detective Gazette
- Two pages of a real issue of the Santa Ana newspaper The Register, with two articles added about Virginia and Freeman Linder

== Reception ==
Creative Computing wrote "Infocom has come up with another fine game with Witness ... If you have ever longed to work with Philip Marlowe, Miss Marple, or Lord Peter Wimsey, Witness is the next best thing." Dan Gutman in Compute! stated that "The Witness is the latest in Infocom's masterful series in all-text adventures, and it may be their best one yet". He praised the game's feelies and period-accurate prose style, and said that the addition of Duffy avoided Deadline's tendency to "bog down". Gutman cautioned, however, that only those who enjoyed intricate puzzles would like The Witness. BYTE agreed on the game's difficulty, and stated that author Stu Galley "apparently read enough of the [hard-boiled mystery] genre to emulate the style without mocking it", with "quick but thorough and evocative" descriptions. The magazine praised the feelies, and concluded that "Galley and the Infocom staff have succeeded in designing what Sherlock Holmes would call a 'three-pipe problem.'" PC Magazine gave the game 11.0 points out of 12. It stated that the quality of the text parser and intricate plot balanced the "scant" 28 locations in the game.

The Witness received the award for "1984 Best Computer Adventure" at the 5th annual Arkie Awards where judges warned those who thought text adventures were "passe" that the game had "run away with the Arcade Award" just as Infocom's previous text adventure, Deadline, had the previous year.
