= Zork books =

Set of novels

The Zork books were a series of four books, written by S. Eric Meretzky, which took place in the fictional universe of Zork. The books were published by Tor Books. Like the Zork video games, the books were a form of interactive fiction which offered the reader a choice of actions symbolized by pages to turn to, as in the contemporary book series Choose Your Own Adventure or the later Give Yourself Goosebumps series. The protagonists of each book were a boy and girl, called Bill and June on Earth and re-dubbed Bivotar and Juranda in Zork. The settings and plots were reminiscent of locations and events from the Zork universe.

At each ending the player received a score from zero to ten based on how far they had made it through the book and, if the ending were a failure, a chance to try again at the incorrect choice. The books also usually contained a "cheater trap", reached by opting to use an item which does not exist (at least not in the current book). In these traps, the story abruptly ends; the reader is chastised and not given a chance to try again.

The books were written in English and translated into Spanish. All four books were published as "What-Do-I-Do-Now Books". Copies did contain publication errors—page numbers that the reader was directed to turn to or turn back to were at times incorrect. The first three books were published as a trilogy in August and September 1983; each has the titles of the other two listed opposite the cover page. The fourth book in the series was published in October 1984.

== The Forces of Krill ==
The first book in the Zork series, The Forces of Krill, used familiar Zork locations and scoring systems. Bivotar and Juranda are on a quest to find the three Palantirs of Zork and to defeat the evil sorcerer Krill. There were 20 possible endings.

== The Malifestro Quest ==
The second book in the Zork series, The Malifestro Quest, contained several inside jokes for those familiar with the Zork games. Bivotar and Juranda must rescue the hero Syovar and two quirky elves, Fred and Max, from the evil wizard Malifestro. There were 18 possible endings.

== The Cavern of Doom ==
The third book in the Zork series, The Cavern of Doom, tried to capture the "exploring the dungeon" motif of the earlier games. Bivotar and Juranda search the Cavern of Doom, which is an uncharted portion of the Great Underground Empire and the site of several mysterious disappearances, including the elves Fred and Max. There were 17 possible endings.

== Conquest at Quendor ==
The fourth book in the Zork series, the Conquest of Quendor, featured silly riddles reminiscent of Zork II. Bivotar and Juranda search for the Helm of Zork in an attempt to bring peace to the Land of Frobozz, in defiance of Jeearr, a riddle-telling demon. There were 17 possible endings.

== Other books based on Zork ==
Of six novels published as "Infocom Books" by Avon Books between 1989–1991, two were directly based on Zork: The Zork Chronicles by George Alec Effinger (1990) and The Lost City of Zork by Robin W. Bailey (1991).

== Reception ==
Colin Greenland reviewed The Forces of Krill, The Manifestro Quest and The Cavern of Doom for Imagine magazine, and stated that "Any child of any intelligence will swiftly realize they're being patronized, and will return to their own fantasies - and a good thing too."

== Reviews ==
- Review by Mary S. Weinkauf (1984) in Fantasy Review, August 1984

== See also ==
- Gamebook
