= Suspect (video game) =

1984 video game

- Cover art
- Developer: Infocom
- Publisher: Infocom
- Designer: Dave Lebling
- Engine: Z-machine
- Platforms: Amiga, Amstrad CPC, Amstrad PCW, Apple II, Atari 8-bit, Atari ST, Commodore 64, Kaypro II, Mac, MS-DOS
- Release: October 5, 1984
- Genres: Adventure, interactive fiction
- Mode: Single-player

Suspect is an interactive fiction video game designed by Dave Lebling and published by Infocom in 1984. It is the third and last murder mystery Infocom released. It was written in highly portable ZIL and released for Amiga, Amstrad CPC, Amstrad PCW, Apple II, Atari 8-bit computers, Atari ST, Commodore 64, Kaypro II, Mac, and MS-DOS. It is Infocom's fifteenth game.

== Plot ==
Screenshot of the beginning of Suspect

The player's character is a reporter for the fictitious newspaper The Washington Representative. Veronica Ashcroft-Wellman, a longtime friend and wealthy socialite, has sent an invitation to the annual Ashcroft Halloween Ball, where Maryland's high society bluebloods converse and congratulate each other on their fortunes. The paper's editor suggests covering the party as a story, sensing an easy article that could either praise or mock the wealthy. Since it is a costume party, the player's character dons a rented cowboy outfit and attends the gathering. Many attendees wear masks, making it difficult initially to identify them.

Shortly after the start of the party, Veronica is found dead, strangled with a cowboy's lariat and laying near a bullet from the cowboy costume's belt. This positions the player as the prime suspect in Veronica's murder, although other suspects cannot be ruled out; the player previous stored the rope in the closet, and the bullet missing from the player's belt could have been taken. Investigative detective work must be done to identify the real killer.

== Release ==
Suspect included the following physical items in the package:

1. The satirical book Murder and Modern Manners: A Practical Guide to Murder Manners
2. A business card from William Cochrane for King's Point Realty (written on the back: "Veronica— Please call me ASAP. Don't do something you'll regret. Bill")
3. A receipt from "Costumes Unlimited" for the rental of one cowboy costume with lariat and gunbelt
4. An invitation to the Halloween Ball thrown at Ashcroft Manor (written inside: "Dearest... It has been too long since we last talked. Please do try to come to the party. There are so many things I have to tell you. Until then, Veronica")
5. A note from the editor of The Washington Representative asking the player's character to cover the ball for the newspaper
6. A page from The Maryland Countryside magazine, featuring an article about developers encroaching on the "Hunt Club" countryside and a society column piece about the upcoming Halloween Ball

== Reception ==
Based on sales and market-share data, Video magazine listed the game seventh on its list of best selling video games in March 1985. ANALOG Computing praised Suspect's technical sophistication, packaging, and premise, but criticized the game's intrusive "dry humor" and cynical tone. The magazine concluded, "It is certainly complex, detailed and imaginative. I just wish it took itself a little more seriously, both as a game and an example of truly interactive fiction".
