= Decoder pen =

The decoder pen, yes-no pen, yes-know pen or magic pen book is a combination of decoder pen or marker specially designed to reveal invisible ink-encoded pictures or writing, in the form of answers to questions or hidden parts of pictures, with specially created children's books with hidden words and pictures. They were most popular in the 1970s, but continue to be sold at gift shops. Often they were in the form of trivia games, which enabled the player to guess before revealing the answer. Brands of books for use with decoder pens include Yes & Know, and surprise Ink.

However, the pen and paper can be damaged easily if excessive rubbing is used. Therefore, most invisible ink books contain an advisory saying to use a very gentle back and forth motion - not a circular grinding motion, when using the books.

Fans of the adventure games released by Sierra Entertainment in the 1980s such as King's Quest and Space Quest are also familiar with the decoder pen, which was used to reveal the answers to hints in the hints book sold for each game. Eventually these were replaced by a colored translucent plastic window, which eliminated a visually interfering red pattern.

Infocom sold similar hint books called "Invisiclues" for their interactive fiction games.
