= Spellbreaker =

1985 video game

- Developer: Infocom
- Publisher: Infocom
- Designer: Dave Lebling
- Engine: Z-machine
- Platforms: Amiga, Amstrad CPC, Apple II, Atari 8-bit, Atari ST, Commodore 64, MS-DOS, Mac
- Release: Release 63: September 16, 1985; Release 87: September 4, 1986
- Genre: Interactive fiction
- Mode: Single-player

Spellbreaker is an interactive fiction video game written by Dave Lebling and published by Infocom in 1985, the third and final game in the "Enchanter Trilogy." It was released for the Amiga, Amstrad CPC, Apple II, Atari 8-bit computers, Atari ST, Commodore 64, Classic Mac OS, and MS-DOS. Infocom's nineteenth game, Spellbreaker is rated "Expert" difficulty.

== Plot ==
Ten years after the events of Enchanter, the very foundations of magic itself seem to be failing, and the leaders of all the Guilds in the land have gathered to demand answers. In the midst of this impassioned meeting, the crowd is suddenly transformed into a group of toads and newts. Everyone present is affected except for the player and a shadowy figure who flees the hall.

In the course of investigating the mystery, the player learns new, powerful spells that must be used in novel ways. But since magic is no longer dependable, each spell has a chance of failing. The only objects that can help to shore up the effectiveness of sorcery are the Cubes of Foundation, each of which can transport the player to a different location and strengthen certain spells.

== Release ==
Spellbreaker includes the following physical items in the packaging:

1. A Frobozz Magic Magic Equipment Catalog, Special Crisis Edition
2. An Enchanter's Guild pin
3. Six "Enchanter cards", baseball card-like items each containing a picture and information about legendary wizards

== Reception ==
Charles Ardai of Computer Gaming World called parts of Spellbreaker "transcendent". Computer Gaming World's Scorpia stated, "This one is a toughie, folks."

Zzap! ended up giving the game a 91 out of 100 rating, commenting "Nevertheless, Dave Lebling (co author of Zork and Enchanter) has done an excellent job. Dave was responsible for Suspect, a real tour de force of character interaction, and the influence of this game can be seen at all times in Spellbreaker, where the characters play a rather more significant role than in Sorcerer, for example. Yet another Infocom masterpiece - need I say more?"

Popular Computing Weekly rated the game 5 out of 5 stars, saying of it that "The vocabulary is massive. The parser will accept such commands has 'Take the fish out of Belbozs ear then eat it' or 'Read the scroll. Write "Broken" on it. Open the garbage can and drop scroll into the can'. The game is also rich in humour, casting the mind probe spell at various creatures will reward you with very witty and humourous [sic] responses. In conclusion this is another of those Infocom adventures worth buying an Atari or Commodore merely in order to play."

Conversely, SPAG gave the game 3 out of 5 stars, saying "A resounding conclusion to a somewhat uneven series, Spellbreaker deserves to be considered one of Infocom's very best."
