= Feelie (Brave New World) =

Fictional entertainment technology

A feelie is a fictional form of entertainment that appears in the 1932 dystopian sci-fi novel Brave New World by Aldous Huxley. They are a type of film in which the viewer is able to feel all the sensations felt by the protagonist through the use of advanced technology such as a "scent organ", pneumatics and an electric field. In the novel's fictional universe, the masses are kept satisfied using feelies as part of a routine of "synchronized amusement". They commonly depict pornography, and resemble early cinema's focus on spectacle over actual plot. In the novel, the respective building to watch feelies is named a 'feely-palace'.

== Overview ==
Feelies are described as a form of "imbecile" entertainment that allows the masses to be controlled by fulfilling their desires. In a major scene of the book, the character John, from the low-tech and "savage" Malpais Reservation, goes to see a feelie called Three Weeks in a Helicopter. Pornographic in nature, its sensual indulgence enrages John in a similar manner to Huxley himself being angered by sound being added to films.

While the movies of the era the book was written were increasingly being made in the United States, the feelies in Brave New World are depicted as locally made, developed over 22 floors of the "Bureaux of Propaganda" in London and the "Hounslow Feely Studio", whose buildings stretch over seven and a half hectares (19 acres). The real-life venue for Three Weeks in a Helicopter, the Alhambra Music Hall, was ultimately demolished in 1936 to make way for a theatre, reflecting Huxley's fears that mass-produced entertainment would replace art.

Huxley's idea of feelies was a reaction to the recent emergence of sound films (or "talkies"), such as The Jazz Singer (1927), which was controversial at the time and saw a number of detractors. Huxley believed that the introduction of audio was excessive, writing an essay in 1929 called "Silence is Golden". He believed sound cheapened the film's emotional impact, and imagined a future where pleasure was so easily obtained that it became dull. However, he struggled to make it truly appear unexciting.

== Reception ==
In the 1950s, the advent of widescreen technologies, such as CinemaScope and Cinerama, provoked anxious predictions in the press that it would lead to the development of feelies as movies became increasingly immersive. With the emergence of the video game industry, the word "feelie" was used by the company Infocom in the 1980s to describe the physical supplements that were shipped with its games, which were also used as a rudimentary form of copy protection.

In 2013, writer Adam Kirsch stated his belief that feelies would be invented before he died. He noted that while the technology had not yet come to pass, sexuality has seen greater liberation, and vulgarity had been "commodified" in a similar manner to Huxley's predictions, especially via the Internet. Feelies have been noted by critics as resembling the later advent of virtual reality.

== In popular culture ==
The American rock band the Feelies formed in 1976 in Haledon, New Jersey, based their name on the term.

== See also ==
- Smell-O-Vision – technology used to add another sense to the moviegoing experience
