= Dave Lebling =

American computer game writer (born 1949)

David Lebling
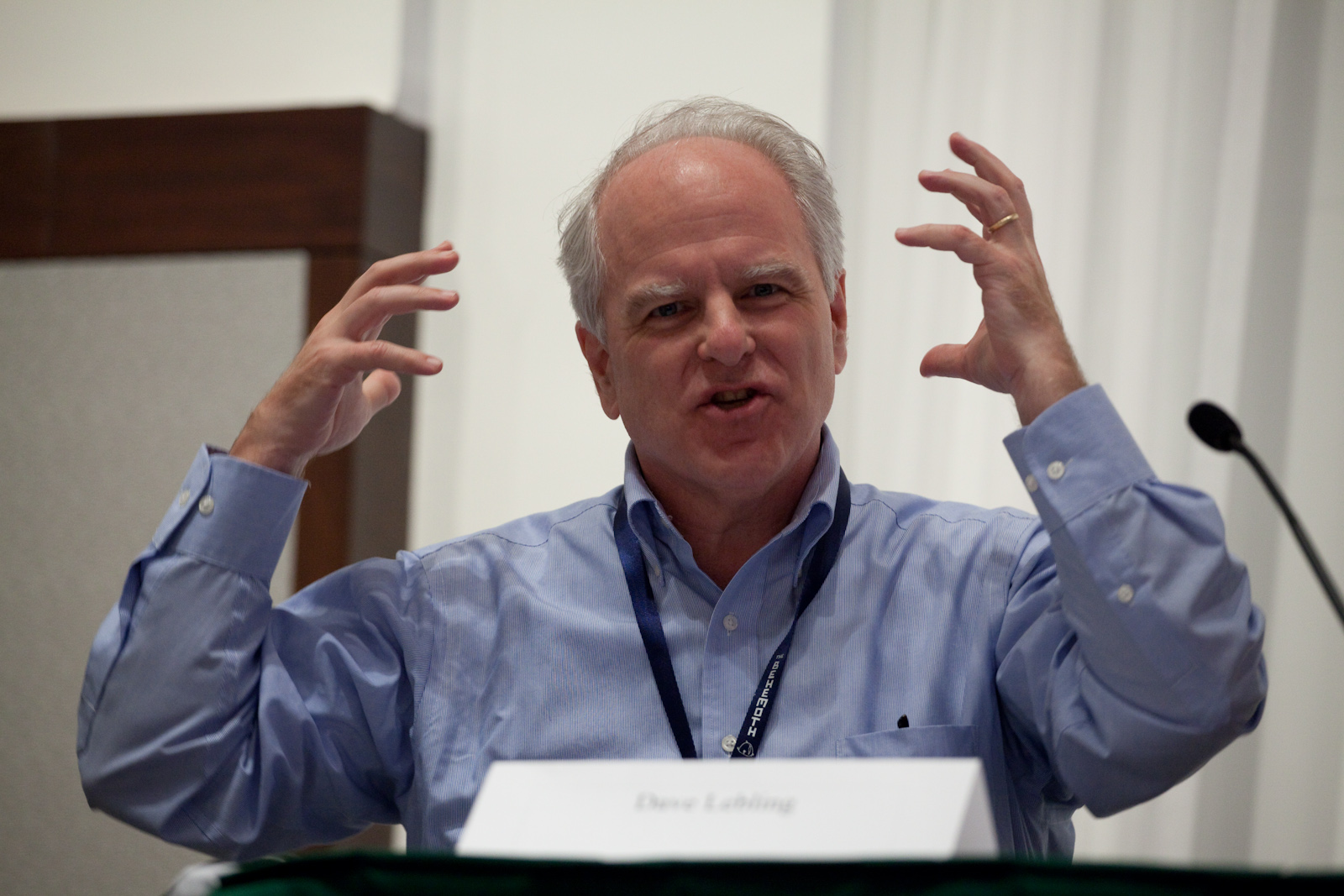
- Lebling in 2010
- Born: October 30, 1949 (age 76)
- Occupations: Video game designer, computer programmer
- Known for: Zork, co-founder of Infocom

Peter David Lebling (born October 30, 1949) is an American interactive fiction game designer (implementor) and programmer who has worked at various companies, including Infocom and Avid.

== Life and career ==
He was born in Washington, D.C., grew up in Maryland, and attended MIT, where he obtained a degree in political science before becoming a member of its Laboratory for Computer Science.

After encountering the original Adventure game (also called Colossal Cave), he was fascinated by the concept and—together with Marc Blank, Tim Anderson and Bruce Daniels—set out to write an adventure game with a better parser, which became Zork. In 1979, he became one of the founders of Infocom.

His games include Zork I, II and III, Starcross, Suspect, Spellbreaker, The Lurking Horror, Maze and James Clavell's Shōgun.

After Infocom's end in 1989, Lebling worked on a GUI spreadsheet program, joined Avid (a company doing special effects for broadcast and film), and designed server applications at Ucentric.

Lebling currently resides in Concord, Massachusetts with his wife. He is a programmer for British defense contractor BAE Systems.
