= Deadline (1982 video game) =

- Developer: Infocom
- Publisher: Infocom
- Designer: Marc Blank
- Engine: Z-machine
- Platforms: Amiga, Amstrad CPC, Amstrad PCW, Apple II, Atari 8-bit, Atari ST, Commodore 64, IBM PC, Mac, Osborne 1, TI-99/4A, TRS-80
- Release: 1982
- Genres: Mystery, Interactive fiction
- Mode: Single-player

Deadline is an interactive fiction detective video game published by Infocom in 1982. Written by Marc Blank, it was Infocom's third game. It was released for the Amstrad CPC, Apple II, Atari 8-bit computers, Commodore 64, IBM PC (as a self-booting disk), Osborne 1, TRS-80, and later for the Amiga and Atari ST.

Deadline was Infocom's first mystery game, their first non-Zork game, and the game that started their tradition of feelies. The number of NPCs, the independence of their behavior from the player's actions, and the parser's complexity were considered revolutionary at the time of the game's release. Also innovative was its use of "feelies"; physical documents that came with the game to help the player solve the mystery, resulting in its more expensive cost relative to other text adventures of the time.

== Plot ==
The beginning of the game

The player's character in Deadline is an unnamed police detective, summoned to a sprawling Connecticut estate to investigate the apparent suicide of wealthy industrialist Marshall Robner.

The suspects, who walk around the estate pursuing their own agendas during the player's investigation, are:

1. Leslie Robner, the victim's wife
2. George Robner, the victim's son
3. Mr. McNabb, the gardener
4. Mrs. Rourke, the housekeeper
5. Mr. Baxter, Robner's business partner
6. Ms. Dunbar, Robner's secretary

== Gameplay ==
New commands were implemented to suit the game's detective theme: the player can accuse or even arrest any of the suspects at any time. A well-timed accusation can cause an unnerved suspect to reveal previously concealed information. For an arrest to stick, however, the player must possess hard evidence of the three basics: motive, method, and opportunity. Without these, the game ends with a description of why the presumed culprit was released. The standard examine and search commands are present, but the player can also fingerprint objects or ask the invaluable Sgt. Duffy to analyze them.

There are only two ways for the player to die, but Infocom gave Deadline a difficulty rating of "Expert", largely due to the abundance of evidence and false leads to be sorted out within a short timespan.

== Development ==
While writing Deadline, Marc Blank was strongly inspired by the 1930s out-of-print books written by Dennis Wheatley. The working title of the game was "Who Killed Marshall Robner", a reference to Wheatley's Who Killed Robert Prentice?. Blank wanted the player to feel like a detective while playing the game, and designed the game and its feelies around that. Because Deadline displayed a timer rather than the move-count and score that other Infocom games of its time showed, the game needed a custom interpreter, which made porting the game to different computers more difficult.

Blank couldn't include all of the game's text in the limited 80KB of disk space. Working with a newly hired advertising agency, Infocom created physical items to provide information not included within the digital game itself. These items were:

1. A police folder in a pouch containing an inspector's casebook
2. A plastic bag with 3 white pills found near Marshall Robner's body
3. Notes from police interviews with Leslie and George Robner, Mr. Baxter, Ms. Dunbar, and Mrs. Rourke
4. corpus delicti (summary of findings from the coroner's examination)
5. A letter from Mr. Coates, Marshall Robner's lawyer, to the Chief of police
6. An official memo from G.K. Anderson of the Lakeville, Connecticut police department
7. A lab report on the teacup Robner drank from before his death
8. A photo of the murder scene, complete with white chalk outline

In later "grey-box" editions of Deadline, many of these documents were incorporated into the Casebook, rather than existing as separate papers.

== Reception ==
Although Computer Gaming World's reviewer disliked the solution to Deadline's mystery, she praised the game's realism, documentation, extensive command vocabulary, and the frustration involved in both finding the killer and presenting enough evidence for a conviction. BYTE called the game "fascinating" and "great fun", calling the multiple endings "a radical departure from the prototypical mystery". PC Magazine called Deadline "of the highest quality. It is thoroughly researched and tested, and it is virtually flawless". The New York Times Book Review also mentioned the narrative and participatory character of the game. K-Power rated Deadline 8 points out of 10, stating that the game "is very exciting, is as good, or better, than Zork, and will bring long hours of enjoyment and, best of all, intrigue". InfoWorld's Essential Guide to Atari Computers recommended the game as among the best adventures for the Atari 8-bit.

The game received an award for "Best Computer Adventure" at the 4th annual Arkie Awards, where judges attributed the "richness and realism" of the game's dialogue to the advanced text parser that allows natural language input rather than the "telegraphic verb-noun phrases that other such disks generally employ". In 1996, Computer Gaming World listed Deadline at #104 among the top 150 best games of all time, calling it "a tough text adventure that placed you in the midst of an intricate police procedural and let you wander around a mansion."

== See also ==
- The Witness (1983)
