= Zork =

1977 video game

- Zork I cover art
- Developer: Infocom
- Publishers: Personal Software; Infocom
- Designers: Tim Anderson; Marc Blank; Dave Lebling; Bruce Daniels
- Engine: ZIL
- Platforms: PDP-10; PDP-11; Personal computer (various)
- Release: 1977 (Zork); 1980 (Zork I); 1981 (Zork II); 1982 (Zork III)
- Genres: Adventure, interactive fiction
- Mode: Single-player

Zork is a text adventure game first released in 1977 by developers Tim Anderson, Marc Blank, Bruce Daniels, and Dave Lebling for the PDP-10 mainframe computer. The original developers and others, as the company Infocom, expanded and split the game into three titles—Zork I: The Great Underground Empire, Zork II: The Wizard of Frobozz, and Zork III: The Dungeon Master—which were released commercially for a range of personal computers beginning in 1980. In Zork, the player explores the abandoned Great Underground Empire in search of treasure. The player moves between the game's hundreds of locations and interacts with objects by typing commands in natural language that the game interprets. The program acts as a narrator, describing the player's location and the results of the player's commands. It has been described as the most famous piece of interactive fiction.

The original game, developed between 1977 and 1979 at the Massachusetts Institute of Technology (MIT), was inspired by Colossal Cave Adventure (1976), the first well-known example of interactive fiction and the first well-known adventure game. The developers wanted to make a similar game that was able to understand more complicated sentences than Adventure's two-word commands. In 1979, they founded Infocom with several other colleagues at the MIT computer center. Blank and Joel Berez created a way to run a smaller portion of Zork on several brands of microcomputer, letting them commercialize the game as Infocom's first products. The first episode was published by Personal Software in 1980, after which Infocom purchased back the rights and self-published all three episodes beginning in late 1981.

Zork was a massive success for Infocom, with sales increasing for years as the market for personal computers expanded. The first episode sold more than 38,000 copies in 1982, and around 150,000 copies in 1984. Collectively, the three episodes sold more than 680,000 copies through 1986, comprising more than one-third of Infocom's sales in this period. Infocom was purchased by Activision in 1986, leading to new Zork games beginning in 1987, as well as a series of books. Reviews of the episodes were very positive, with several reviewers calling Zork the best adventure game to date. Critics regard it as one of the greatest video games. Later historians have noted the game as foundational to the adventure game genre, as well as influencing the MUD and massively multiplayer online role-playing game genres. In 2007, Zork was included in the game canon by the Library of Congress as one of the ten most important video games in history.

== Gameplay ==
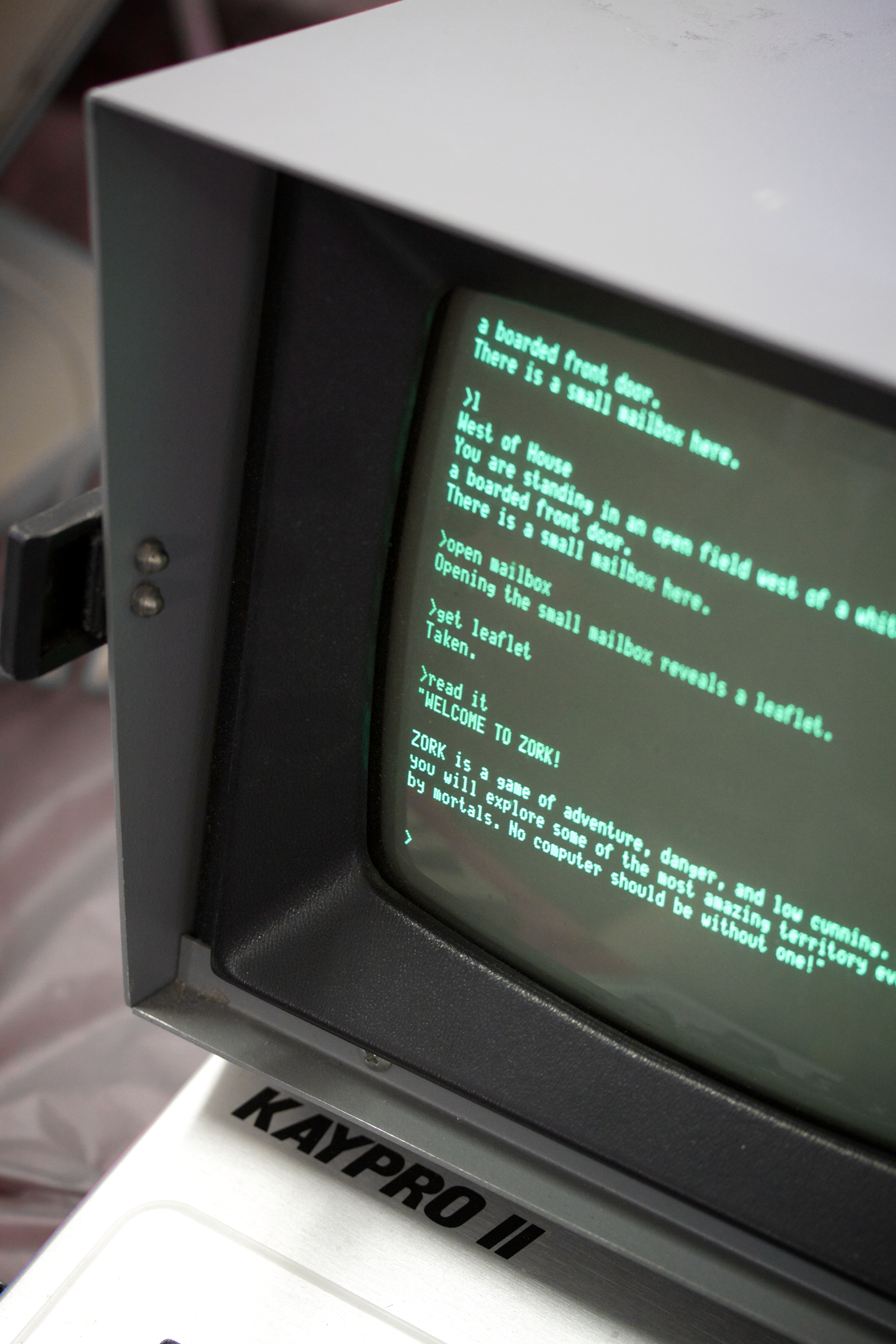
Zork being played on a Kaypro CP/M computer

Zork is a text-based adventure game wherein the player explores the ruins of the Great Underground Empire. The player types text commands for their character to traverse locations, solve puzzles, and collect treasure. The game has hundreds of locations, each with a name and description, and the player's commands interact with the objects, obstacles, and creatures within them. Commands can be one or two words (e.g., "get lamp" or "north") or more complex phrases (e.g., "put the lamp and sword in the case"). The command must fit the location's context (e.g., "get lamp" works only if a lamp is present). The program acts as a narrator, describing to the player their location and the results of certain actions. If the game does not understand the player's commands, it asks for the player to retype their actions. The program's replies are typically in a sarcastic, conversational tone, much as a Game Master would use in leading players in a tabletop role-playing game.

The original 1977 version of the game was a single release, Zork. When it was converted into a commercial software title, it was divided into three episodes, with new and expanded sections added to the latter two episodes. Much of the game world is composed of puzzles that must eventually be solved, such as a set of buttons on a dam or a maze to be traversed. Some puzzles have more than one solution. For instance, since the "Loud Room" is too overwhelmingly loud for the player to perform actions, the player can either empty the nearby dam to stop the sound of water falling, or shout "echo" in the room to change its acoustics. In the first episode, or Zork I, a thief character is wandering the underground as well, taking items that have been left behind or even stealing from the player's possessions. The player can fight or evade the thief, and can recover stolen items from the thief's treasure room. Some locations contain antagonists that the player must fight or overcome. Beginning in Zork II the player can learn magic spells to use in puzzles and combat. In dark areas, the player must carry a lantern or other light source to avoid being eaten by a monster called a grue. There is a limit to how much "inventory" one can carry, determined by the combined weight of objects, rather than the quantity.

A principal goal of each episode is to collect all the treasures, many of which are hidden behind puzzles. As treasures are collected or tasks are accomplished, the player's score increases, providing a rough measure of how much of the game has been completed. The player may traverse the game world and solve puzzles in almost any order, although some passageways require problem-solving to get through, and some puzzles require the player to possess something gained from solving a different puzzle. In Zork III, unlike in prior episodes, there is a timed component that directly affects the outcome. An earthquake will occur after about 130 moves, opening one passageway and closing another. In each episode, the treasures are needed to reach the conclusion of the game.

== Plot ==
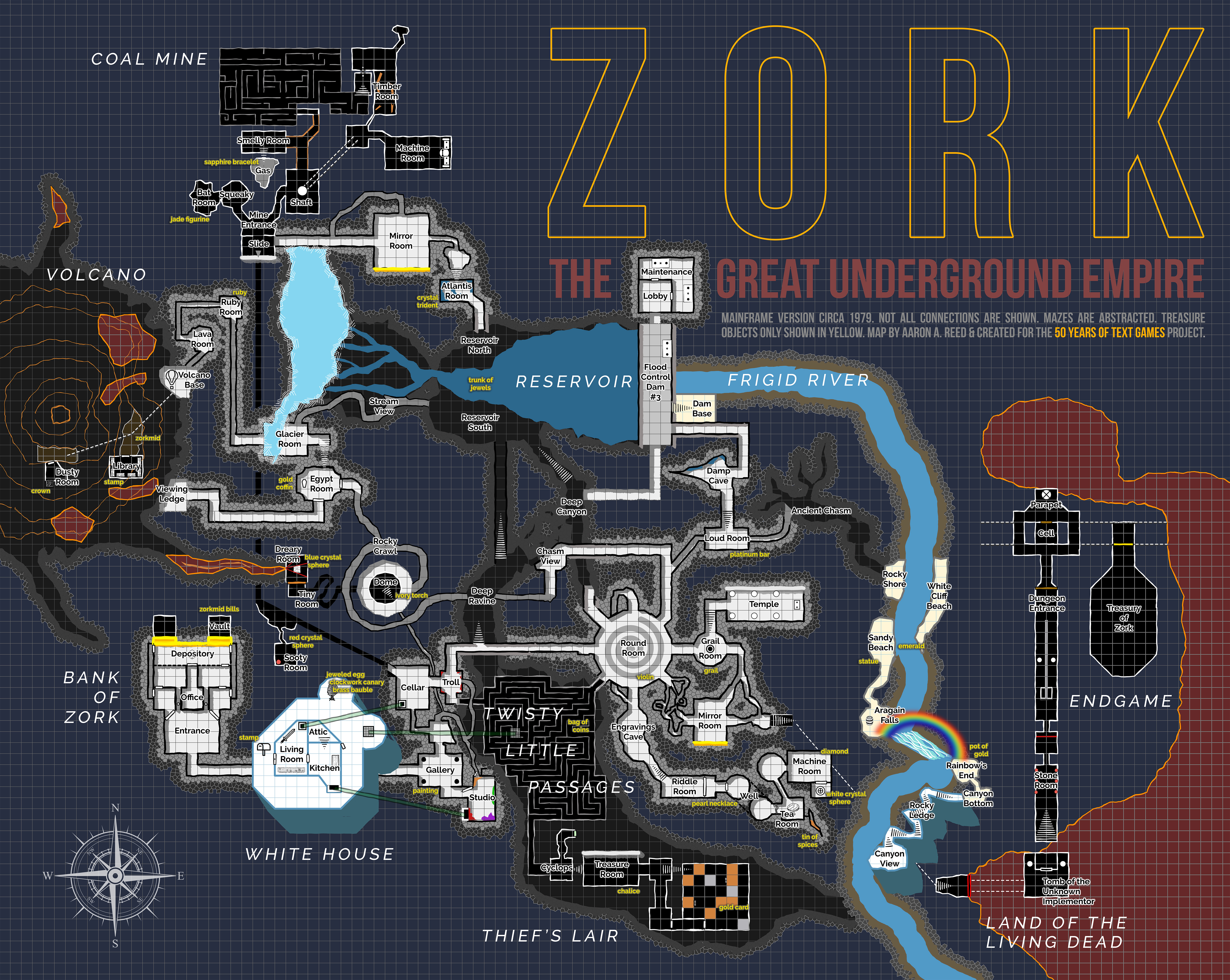
Map of the 1977 Zork world drawn by Aaron A. Reed for the 50 Years of Text Games project

Most of the setting is established through the game's written descriptions of items and locations, as well as manuals in later game releases. Zork is set in a massive, abandoned cave complex built by the Quendor Empire, which was eventually renamed to the Great Underground Empire by Lord Dimwit Flathead, the seventh of twelve rulers in the Flathead Dynasty, who spent his reign building large-scale, mostly pointless projects such as an underground dam and the royal museum. The empire's overspending caused it to collapse, and all the residents left.

The original 1977 Zork begins with the unnamed player standing in an open field west of a white house. The house leads to an underground area where most of the game takes place. The player must find 32 treasures and store them in a trophy case. After they successfully do so, the Dungeon Master invites them to the Tomb of the Unknown Implementor, leading to the endgame. The player must then solve a final series of puzzles to access the Treasury of Zork, where the Dungeon Master appears and transforms them to look like himself, signifying their succession to his position, before he vanishes, ending the game.

Zork I begins the same way as the 1977 game and concerns the player's search for 19 treasures, including many of the originals and a few new ones. After storing treasures in the trophy case like in the 1977 game, the player discovers an ancient map that leads to another cave entrance, setting up the plot for the sequel. In Zork II, which includes several areas, puzzles and treasures from the 1977 game not present in Zork I, the player learns of the royal Flathead family, and meets the Wizard of Frobozz, a once-respected enchanter exiled by Lord Dimwit Flathead when his powers began to fade. The wizard appears randomly throughout the game and casts spells that begin with the letter "F" on the player. These have several effects, such as "Fluoresce", which causes the player to glow, and "Freeze", which keeps the player stuck in place for a few turns. The player must obtain the wand from the wizard to complete the final puzzles. In Zork III, the player character gathers the garb of the Dungeon Master to become his successor. The final installment includes the Puzzle Room and the endgame from the 1977 Zork.

== Development ==
=== Inception ===
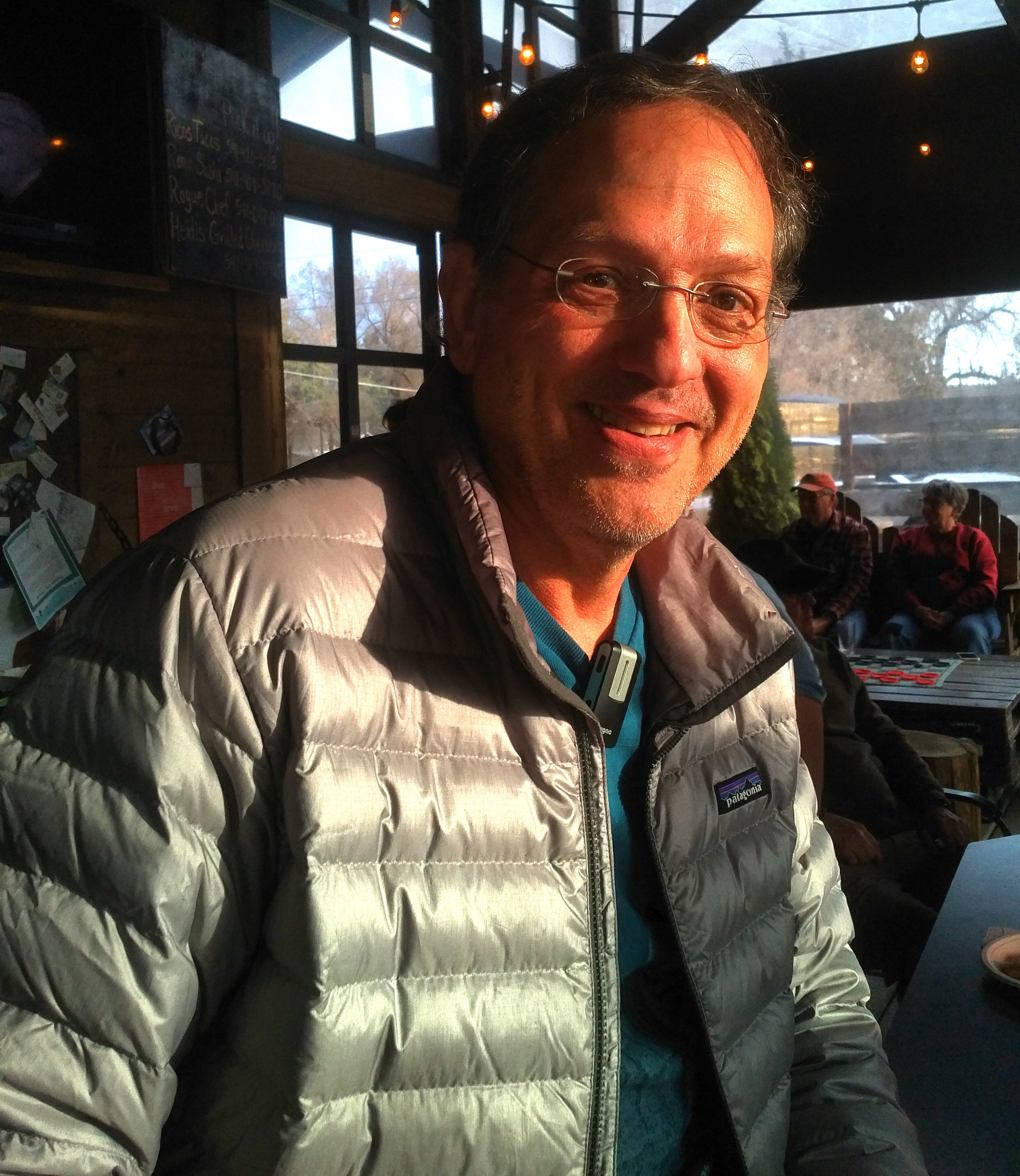
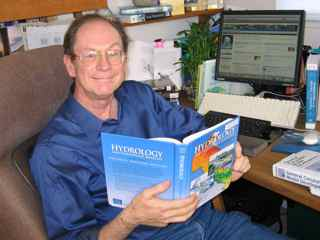
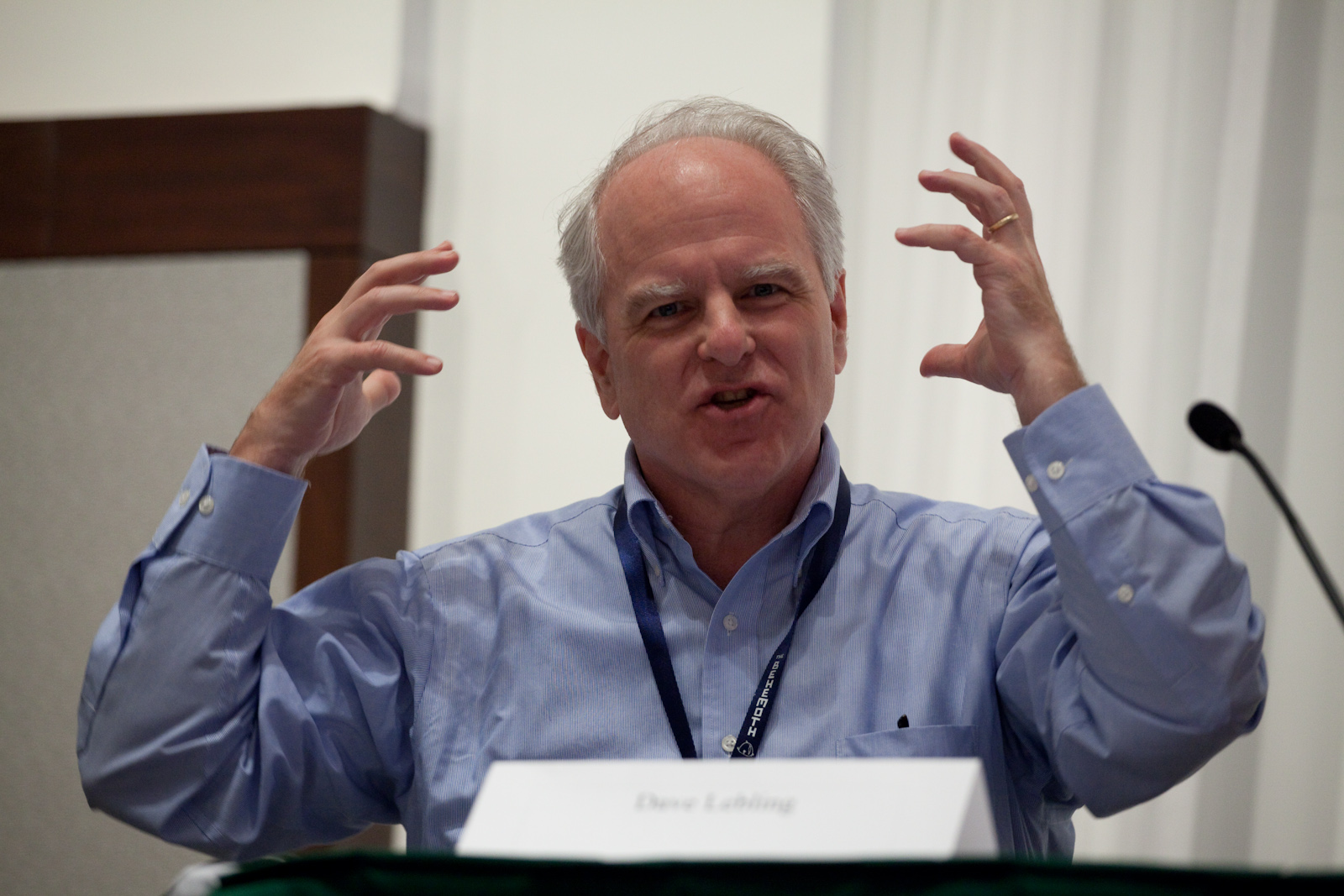
Marc Blank in 2018, Bruce Daniels in 2009, and Dave Lebling in 2010

Tim Anderson, Marc Blank, Bruce Daniels, and Dave Lebling began developing Zork in May 1977. The four were members of the Dynamic Modelling Group, a computer science research division at the Massachusetts Institute of Technology (MIT) Laboratory for Computer Science—Anderson, Blank, and Daniels as students and Lebling as a research staff member. Their work was inspired by Colossal Cave Adventure, a text-based game that is the first well-known example of interactive fiction and the first well-known adventure game. Adventure was immensely popular among the small population of computer users of the time and a big hit at MIT in early 1977. By the end of May, players had managed to completely solve it.

The four programmers began to design a game that would be a "better" text adventure game, with inputs more complex than Adventure's two-word commands and puzzles less obtuse. They believed that their division's MDL programming language would be better suited for processing complex text inputs than the Fortran code used in Adventure. The group was familiar with creating video games: Blank and Anderson had worked on a multiplayer trivia game called Trivia (1976), and Lebling was heavily involved with Maze (1973), a multiplayer first-person shooter and the first 3D first-person game ever made. Lebling first created a natural language input system, or parser, that could process typed two-word instructions. Anderson and Blank built a small prototype text game to use it. Zork's prototype was built for the Digital Equipment Corporation (DEC) PDP-10 mainframe computer, the only system that supported their programming language.

While Lebling took a two-week vacation, Anderson, Blank, and Daniels designed an adventure game concept, which Anderson and Blank then developed as an early version of Zork. This prototype contained simple versions of many concepts seen in the final game, including puzzles and locations. According to Anderson, "it took time for people to learn how to write good problems", and Lebling's first, uncomplex parser was only "almost as smart as Adventure's". The game was unnamed, so the group chose "zork" as the file name, one of several nonsense words used around the lab at the time in a variety of contexts. Anderson later said that the group often used the term for programs still in development. The group, referring to themselves as the "implementers", continued working on the game after Lebling returned, adding features and iterating on the parser through June 1977. Grues were added to replace pits that would kill players in the dark; while play-testing, Lebling noticed that his character fell into a pit while in the attic of the house. The name "grue" was taken from the works of Jack Vance, though the design of the monster was original to Zork.

Lebling contends that Adventure was one of Zork's only influences, as there were few other games to emulate at the time. Although the game's combat is based on Dungeons & Dragons, Lebling said the other developers had never played it. He also thought of the parser and associated text responses as taking on the role of the Dungeon Master from a Dungeons & Dragons game, trying to lead the player through a story solely by describing it; this had also been the idea behind the parser in Adventure.

=== Creation ===
The developers did not announce their game while it was in development, but a lack of security on the MIT systems meant that anyone who could access the PDP-10 computer over the ARPANET could see what programs were being run. As a result, a small community of people, many of whom had been involved in playing and contributing to Trivia, would "snoop" on the system for new programs. They found the new "Zork" adventure game and spread word of it under that name. This community—dozens or possibly hundreds of players, according to Lebling—interacted with the developers as they created the game, playtesting additions and submitting bug reports. The implementers added a command transcript feature to keep track of what commands players tried to use unsuccessfully.

By the end of June, the game was approximately half the size of the final Zork, and had a substantial community of players for the time. The group added locations such as a volcano and coal mine, and soon shifted their efforts to improving the game's engine and adding the ability to save the player's progress in the game. Following user requests, they also added the ability for the game to run on PDP-10 computers running different operating systems—TENEX and TOPS-20—which were much more popular than the Incompatible Timesharing System operating system the MIT computer used. These users then set up a mailing list to distribute updates to the game. The developers returned to creating new content in the fall of 1977, adding the "Alice in Wonderland" section and a system for fighting enemies.

Around this time, community member Ted Hess at DEC decoded the protections the group had made for the source code, and another DEC employee, Bob Supnik, created a port of the game to Fortran. This port, released in March 1978, opened the game to a wider set of players without access to a PDP-10 mainframe. At the time, the team had decided to give the game an actual name besides "zork", and chose Dungeon. This name was used for the Fortran version, which was spread through the DEC users group as one of its most popular pieces of software. TSR Hobbies claimed the title violated their trademark for Dungeons & Dragons, and the developers reverted to their original title.

Over the course of 1978, the team added the bank and Royal Zork Puzzle Museum sections, along with some puzzles and ideas suggested by players. The last puzzle was added in February 1979, though the team continued to release bug fix updates until the final update in January 1981. Anderson attributes this to the team running out of ideas and time, and having run out of space in the one megabyte of memory allocated for the game.

Very little of the game was planned ahead of time, nor were aspects of the game specific to one developer; instead, whenever one of the developers had an idea they liked, that developer would add it to the game, developing the concept and writing the text to go with it. According to Lebling, Blank ended up focusing mostly on the parser, Anderson on the game code, Blank and Daniels on new puzzles, and Lebling on descriptions of locations. Anderson says that Blank wrote "40 or 50" iterations of the parser, and describes Daniels as designing puzzles that were then largely implemented by the others. He credits Blank with vehicles and saving, and Lebling with the robot, grues, and the fighting system. To immerse the player in the game, the developers decided not to describe the player character, removing any accidental descriptions or gendered pronouns. The text responses to the player's commands were frequently opinionated and sarcastic, a design choice that mirrored the group's speaking patterns. The team felt it would both make the system feel less like a computer and also train the player to write commands in a way that the parser could understand rather than ways it would misinterpret.

=== Infocom ===
In 1979, Anderson, Blank, Lebling, and five other members of the Dynamic Modelling Group incorporated Infocom as a software company for members to join after leaving MIT. No specific projects were initially agreed upon and Infocom had no paid employees, but discussions were focused on developing software for smaller mainframe computers. Blank and Joel Berez came up with a plan to make Zork work on personal microcomputers, which were then beginning to become popular and which would greatly expand the audience for the game. Although microcomputers had very limited memory space compared to mainframe computers, they felt the project might be viable using floppy disks and a custom programming language if the game was cut into two pieces.

The pair worked on the project through the summer and fall of 1979 without pay, as the new company had the funds for only the computers. They ported the game to a new Zork Implementation Language (ZIL), which would then be run on a standardized "Z-machine" software-based computer. For each type of microcomputer they wanted to release Zork or other ZIL-based games on, they could write an interpreter program that could run the Z-Machine instead of rewriting each game. Lebling divided Zork in half to create standalone episodes, modifying the game's layout to improve its flow and disconnecting locations now in separate episodes.

By the end of 1979 Berez had been elected the company's president. The core game was complete, but it had been run only on DECSYSTEM-20 and PDP-11 mainframe computers. Infocom purchased a TRS-80 personal computer early in 1980, which could run the game after Blank and Scott Cutler created an interpreter program. Infocom began preparing to release the first section under the title Zork: The Great Underground Empire – Part I. Mike Dornbrook, who had never played the game, tested it as an audience surrogate. He felt that the game would be wildly successful and develop a cult following, and urged Infocom to produce tie-in products like maps, hints, and shirts. The rest of the company was not convinced enough to start producing any such add-ons, but they did add an object in the game that gave an address for players to mail in for maps and hints in case it proved popular.

The game now complete, the company began looking for a professional publisher with store and distributor connections. They felt this was preferable to self-publishing. Berez approached Microsoft, who declined based on the game competing with Microsoft Adventure (1979), their version of Adventure. Microsoft CEO Bill Gates was a fan of Zork, but by the time he heard of the proposal, Infocom was in negotiations with another publisher, Personal Software, one of the first professional software publishing companies. Personal Software agreed to publish the game in June 1980, sending the company an advance payment. Zork: The Great Underground Empire, also known as Zork I or just Zork, was published for the TRS-80 in December 1980. Since Personal Software declined to publish the 1979 PDP-11 version of the game, Infocom sold some copies earlier in the year after announcing it to PDP-11 user groups. Lebling later recalled that about twenty floppy disk copies were sold directly with Anderson's typewritten manual.

By the end of 1980, an Apple II version of Zork I was completed and sold through Personal Software. Infocom began receiving requests for hints and maps as predicted, and Berez began handling map and poster orders while Dornbrook wrote customized hints for players; in September 1981 he founded the Zork Users Group as a separate company to handle all mail order sales and hint requests. Infocom eventually produced hint booklets with progressive answers to questions written in invisible ink, branded as InvisiClues. Meanwhile, Lebling worked on converting the second half of Zork into Zork II, but in the process thought up several new puzzles for the game. Although as late as December 1980 he told Byte that it would be a two-part game, it soon became clear that the second half would not fit into the allotted space. As a result, the game was split again into Zork II: The Wizard of Frobozz and Zork III: The Dungeon Master. According to Lebling, splitting the game into episodes led to different atmospheres: Zork I was focused on exploration and Adventure-style gameplay, II had more of a focus on plot and added magic spells to the base game, and III was less straightforward, with time-sensitive aspects. Marc Blank constructed Zork III and added gameplay changes such as the modified point system to move the game away from straightforward dungeon exploration.

Zork II was offered to Personal Software in April 1981 and the contract was signed in June, but Infocom grew wary of continuing this relationship. The Infocom team felt that Personal Software was not advertising Zork I very strongly, and did not seem excited about Infocom's plans for Zork III and other planned text adventure games such as Deadline and Starcross. Personal Software soon stopped publishing entertainment software altogether and rebranded as VisiCorp in 1982 to align with its VisiCalc spreadsheet software. Rather than find another publisher, Infocom decided to self-publish its games and began renting office space and contracting with production facilities. It bought out Personal Software's stock of Apple II Zork I copies and began publishing Zork I and II directly by the end of 1981. Zork III followed in the fall of 1982. Infocom developed interpreters for the Commodore 64, Atari 8-bit computers, CP/M systems, and IBM PC compatibles, and released the episodes of Zork for them as well in 1982.

== Reception ==
=== Sales ===
Following its 1980 release, Zork I became a bestseller from 1982 through 1985, with 380,000 copies sold by 1986. In its first nine months Personal Software sold 7,500 copies for the TRS-80 and Apple II. (Note: I.e., 1,500 copies of Zork I for the TRS-80, and 6,000 copies for the Apple II.) Sales ballooned as Infocom began self-publishing the trilogy and the personal computer market expanded. Zork I had sold 38,000 copies by the end of 1982, nearly 100,000 in 1983, and around 150,000 copies in 1984. Its success outpaced Infocom's later games; Inc. reported in 1983 that Zork I, only one of Infocom's fifteen released titles, composed twenty percent of their annual sales. Zork I sales declined beginning in 1985. The second and third parts of Zork also sold well, though not as highly as the first: more than 170,000 Zork II and 130,000 Zork III copies sold by 1986.

Overall sales of the first three episodes combined reached 250,000 copies by 1984, more than 680,000 copies through 1986, including the 1986 Zork Trilogy compilation release, and over 760,000 copies by early 1989. Between 1982 and 1986, the Zork trilogy composed more than one-third of Infocom's two million total game sales. Activision purchased Infocom in 1986 and reported that the three Zork games and trilogy compilation sold another 80,000 copies by early 1989.

=== Reviews ===
The episodes of Zork were highly praised in contemporaneous reviews. Byte and 80 Micro praised their writing, which the Byte reviewer described as "entertaining, eloquent, witty, and precise". Reviewers for Softalk and The Space Gamer enjoyed how the parser let them input more complex sentences than did earlier games, the Softalk review noting that every other game since Adventure had limited the player to two-word phrases, though they also thought players would largely stick with clearer two-word commands. 80 Micro wondered whether Zork could ever be completed because of how much the parser let the player do. Byte concluded that "no single advance in the science of Adventure has been as bold and exciting" as Zork, a sentiment echoed by Softalk.

In the years after its release, Zork I received more reviews praising the game in relation to Adventure and the genre. Jerry Pournelle described the mainframe and Personal Software versions as "more difficult and more interesting" than Adventure in 1980, and recommended the Infocom version in 1983, saying that "if you liked Adventure and wanted more ... I guarantee you'll love Zork". Computer Gaming World in 1982, PC Magazine in 1982, and SoftSide in 1983 all recommended it as a "must-have" for anyone interested in fantasy or adventure games. Family Computing, in late 1983, proclaimed it a classic of the genre and the game that made the adventure genre more than a novelty.

Reviewers similarly praised Zork's second and third episodes. Softline recommended Zork II for its "well-balanced mix of humor, wit, and wry puns" for both new and experienced players. PC Magazine said it would appeal to all players and that the game was challenging, enjoyable, and funny. A reviewer for Softalk said it broke away from both the first episode and Adventure to be "fresh and interesting". Some of the puzzles in Zork II were later considered "infamously difficult", and in a hint book, Infocom apologized for one puzzle's difficulty and reliance on baseball knowledge. Reviews in Softalk and Creative Computing named Zork III as the best in the trilogy. PC World said it was "just as exciting and puzzling as Zork I and II", though its puzzles could be frustrating. A review in Fantasy Gamer called it "possibly the ultimate in all-text adventure games". K-Power concluded that Zork III was "the most intelligent text game for a microcomputer that we've ever seen".

Commodore Magazine, in June 1983, described the combined trilogy as the most popular adventure game, as well as the best. The Addison-Wesley Book of Atari Software 1984 gave all three parts of Zork an overall A+ rating. It called Zork I "the definitive adventure game", adding that Zork II "has the same outstanding command flexibility, wry humor, and word recognition of Zork", and concluded that Zork III was "perhaps the most entertaining of the three" and "a highwater mark for subtlety and logic". InfoWorld's Essential Guide to Atari Computers recommended the trilogy as among the best adventure games for the Atari 8-bit computer.

== Legacy ==
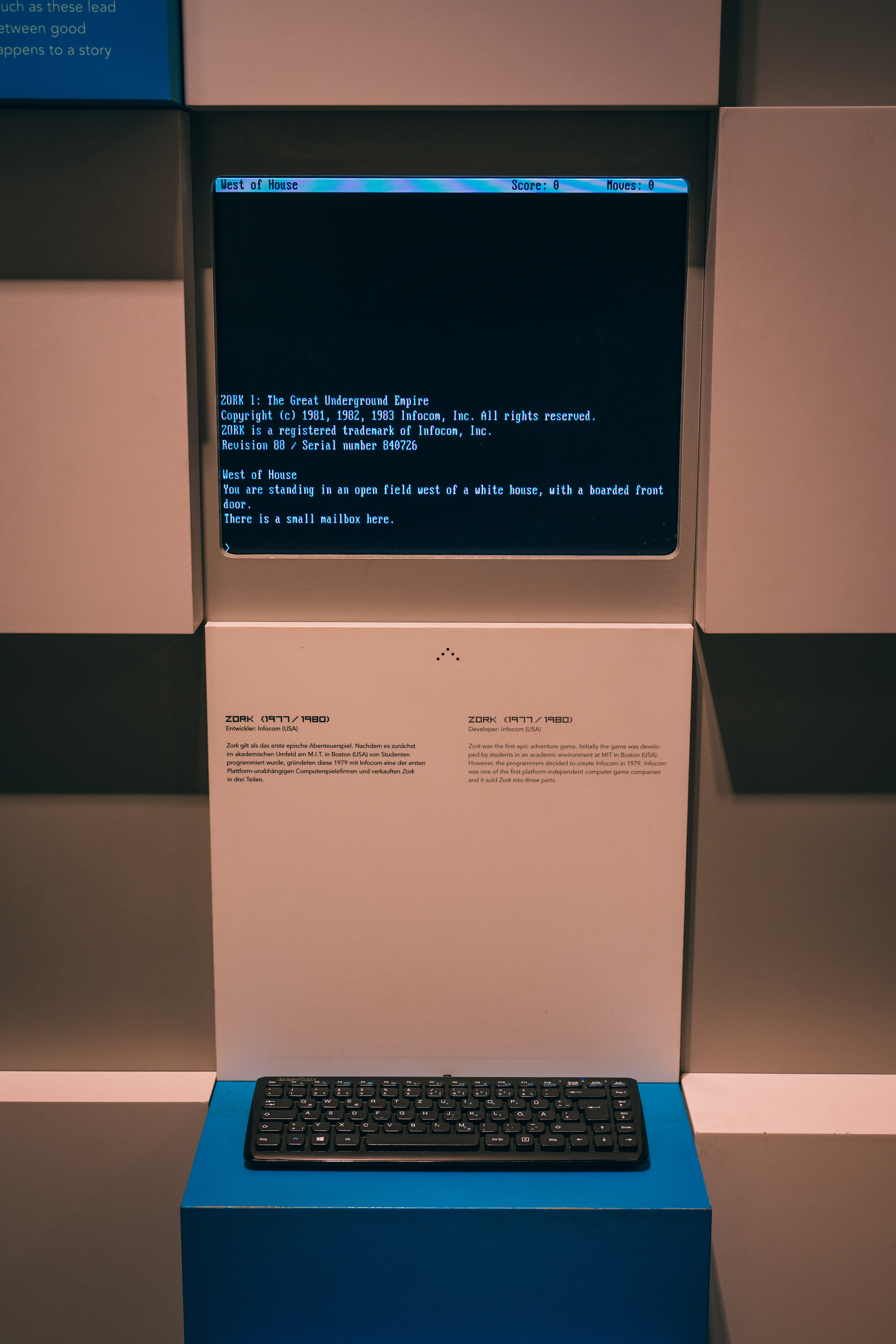
Zork I at the Computerspielemuseum Berlin

Zork has been described as "by far the most famous piece of [interactive fiction]" and "the father figure of the genre". Game historian Matt Barton contended that "to say that Zork is an influential adventure game is like saying the Iliad is an influential poem". Rather than simply influencing games, Barton said it instead showed that the computer could simulate a rich virtual world, and helped lay the foundations of video game concepts around exploring, collecting objects, and overcoming problems. Nick Montfort, in his book on interactive fiction Twisty Little Passages: An Approach to Interactive Fiction (2003), suggested that Zork's legacy and influence lay not in its parser or writing, but in the way it modeled the game world as a complex, dynamic space that the player moved through. Janet Murray, in Hamlet on the Holodeck (1997), considered this a result of the way the game was programmed compared to other games of the time, with each area, item, and actor modeled as their own object that could act and be acted upon. Historians have argued that Zork, along with Colossal Cave Adventure, influenced the creation of the MUD genre, and through it the more recent massively multiplayer online role-playing game genre.

The game's natural language parser has been noted as having a strong personality, and it was one of the first games to have one. It has been cited as starting a strong trend in writing for adventure games having "metafictional humor, and tendency towards self-parody". Decades later Zork is still cited as an inspiration for text interfaces such as chatbots. It has also been used, along with other text adventure games, as a framework for testing natural language processing systems.

Zork was listed on several lists of the best video games more than a decade after release. In 1992 Computer Gaming World added Zork to its Hall of Fame. It was placed on "best games of all time" lists for Computer Gaming World and Next Generation in 1996, and Next Generation listed the entire series as a whole in 1999. In 2016 PC Gamer ranked Zork as one of the fifty most important video games ever made for establishing Infocom as a studio and defining an entire generation of adventure games. In 2007 Zork was listed among the ten "game canon" video games selected for preservation by the Library of Congress. In November 2025, Microsoft, which had acquired Activision, released Zork I, II, and III as open source.

The grue has been used as an homage to classic, early computer gaming, referenced in games such as NetHack, World of Warcraft, and Alan Wake. A reference to grues is also made in title and refrain of Nerdcore rapper MC Frontalot's song "It Is Pitch Dark". Writer Bernard Perron, while discussing horror in video games, stated that being hunted by a grue was a "terrifying situation no player had ever experienced before". IGN regarded the grue as one of the best video game villains, stating that the dialogue "It is pitch black. You are likely to be eaten by a grue" was effective, and how despite some physical characteristics being made clear later, players have their own "utterly personal mental image of what a grue looks like". They noted that while it started as a solution to a game problem, it had evolved to become "one of the chief boogiemen in the early history of video games".

=== Later games and media ===
Zork was the centerpiece of Infocom's game catalog, and Infocom quickly followed it with several more text adventure games using variants of the Zork codebase and the Z-machine, each of which sold tens of thousands of copies. By 1984, three years after Infocom began self-publishing Zork I, Infocom had fifty full-time employees, US$6 million in annual sales, and twelve other games released. Infocom internally nicknamed its early games in relation to Zork, such as "Zork: the Mystery" (Deadline, 1982), "Zorks in Space" (Starcross, 1982), and Zork IV (Enchanter, 1983). By 1986 this had increased to 26 total titles. Although Wishbringer: The Magick Stone of Dreams (1985) was ostensibly set in the same world as Zork, the company had not made any more official Zork games, releasing only a Zork Trilogy compilation of all three episodes.

In 1985 Infocom diversified into professional software by creating a relational database product called Cornerstone. Poor sales led to financial difficulties and the company was sold to Activision in 1986. Infocom then created two more Zork games: Beyond Zork: The Coconut of Quendor (1987), which added a graphical map and more role-playing and combat elements, and Zork Zero: The Revenge of Megaboz (1988), a prequel game that added graphical elements and menus as well as graphical minigames. Infocom's tenure under Activision was rocky, and rising costs and falling profits, exacerbated by a lack of new products in 1988, led Activision to close Infocom in 1989.

Activision returned to the series with several graphic adventure games: Return to Zork (1993), Zork Nemesis: The Forbidden Lands (1996), and Zork: Grand Inquisitor (1997). It also released Zork: The Undiscovered Underground (1997), a free text adventure game partially written by original Infocom implementers Michael Berlyn and Marc Blank to promote Zork: Grand Inquisitor. In 2009 Jolt Online Gaming released Legends of Zork, a freemium browser-based online adventure game.

The original Zork games have been re-released in several compilations since Zork Trilogy. They are included in The Lost Treasures of Infocom (1991), Zork Anthology (1994), Classic Text Adventure Masterpieces of Infocom (1996), and Zork Legacy Collection (1996). A graphical port of Zork I for the PlayStation and Sega Saturn consoles was produced by Shōeisha in Japan in 1996, nineteen years after its original release. Unofficial versions of Zork have been created for over forty years for a wide range of systems, such as browsers or smart speakers.

Four gamebooks, written by Infocom developer Steve Meretzky and set in the Zork world, were published in 1983–1984: The Forces of Krill (1983), The Malifestro Quest (1983), The Cavern of Doom (1983), and Conquest at Quendor (1984). These books, known collectively as the "Zork books", are presented as interactive fiction in the style of the Choose Your Own Adventure series, wherein the player makes periodic choices and turns to a page that corresponds to that choice. Two novels were published based on the original game: The Zork Chronicles by George Alec Effinger (1990) and The Lost City of Zork by Robin Wayne Bailey (1991). In 1996 Threshold Entertainment acquired the rights to Zork and announced plans to create a Zork movie and live action TV series, though it was never produced.
