= Bureaucracy (video game) =

1987 video game

- Developer: Infocom
- Publisher: Infocom
- Designer: Douglas Adams
- Engine: Z-machine
- Platforms: Amiga, Amstrad CPC, Apple II, Atari ST, Commodore 128, MS-DOS, Macintosh
- Release: Release 86: February 12, 1987; Release 116: June 2, 1987
- Genre: Interactive fiction
- Mode: Single-player

Bureaucracy is an interactive fiction video game released by Infocom in 1987, scripted by comic science fiction author Douglas Adams. Infocom's twenty-fourth game, it is part of the Infocom Plus range which requires a machine with a minimum of 128K of memory.

== Plot ==
The player must confront a long and complicated series of bureaucratic hurdles resulting from a recent change of address. Mail is being delivered to the wrong address, bank accounts are inaccessible, and nothing is as it should be. The game includes a measure of simulated blood pressure which rises when "frustrating" events happen and lowers after a period of no annoying events. Once a certain blood pressure level is reached, the player suffers an aneurysm and the game ends.

While undertaking the seemingly simple task of retrieving misdirected mail, the player encounters a number of bizarre characters, including an antisocial hacker, a paranoid weapons enthusiast, and a tribe of Zalagasan cannibals. At the same time, the player must deal with impersonal corporations, counterintuitive airport logic, and a hungry llama.

== Gameplay ==
Infocom rated Bureaucracy as "Advanced" in its difficulty rating system.

The game begins with a short online "software registration form" displayed on the screen. After the form has been completed, the game uses the given information after appropriately mangling it. (For example, the game will persistently address the player as the wrong gender, and whatever the player enters as "least favourite colour" will appear in numerous descriptions.)

The game has 50 locations.

== Release ==
The Bureaucracy packaging includes the following physical items:

1. A pamphlet entitled You're ready to move! from the fictional bank Fillmore Fiduciary Trust
2. A flier advertising the fictional magazine Popular Paranoia
3. A welcome letter from the player's new employer, Happitec Corporation
4. A Fillmore "Better Beezer" credit card application form (each sheet of the triplicate carbon copy form had different instructions and questions)
5. A very skinny pencil (similar to those provided at banks)

== Reception ==
Bureaucracy sold 40,000 copies. Compute!'s Gazette praised its parser and feelies, and liked the player's actions directly affecting blood pressure. Game reviewers Hartley and Patricia Lesser complimented Bureaucracy in their "The Role of Computers" column in Dragon #124 (1987), calling it "an outrageous journey through red tape that puts you directly in the middle of a bureaucratic muddle so convoluted that you can't help but laugh." Jerry Pournelle named Bureaucracy as his game of the month for October 1987, stating that he and Larry Niven became "engrossed". Computer Gaming World described it as "a linear adventure with some very tough puzzles in the midst of some incredible madness".

== See also ==
- Infocom
