= Invisible ink =

Substance used for writing which is invisible and can later be made visible

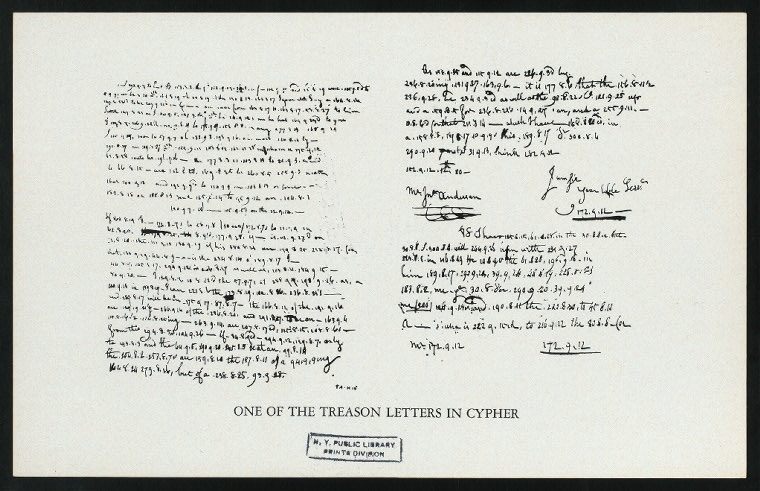
A coded letter from Benedict Arnold, originally written in invisible ink. Handwriting by Peggy Shippen Arnold is interspersed with coded communication in Arnold's hand.

Invisible ink, also known as security ink or sympathetic ink, is a substance used for writing, which is invisible either on application or soon thereafter, and can later be made visible by some means, such as heat or ultraviolet light. Invisible ink is one form of steganography.

== History ==
One of the earliest writers to mention an invisible ink is Aeneas Tacticus, in the 4th century BC. He mentions it in discussing how to survive under siege but does not indicate the type of ink to be used. This was part of his list of the 20 different methods of secret communications in a book called On the Defense of Fortifications. One of the techniques that involved steganography involved puncturing a tiny hole above or below letters in a document to spell out a secret message. This did not include an invisible ink but the Germans improved on the method during World War I and World War II. They used invisible ink and microdots instead of pinpricks.

Philo of Byzantium may be the first writer known to describe an invisible ink using a reagent around 217–218 BC, with oak galls and vitriol. These ingredients were used to make oak gall ink. People soon discovered that they could write invisibly with one of the ingredients and then cause the writing to appear by adding the other. Pliny the Elder and the Roman poet Ovid gave advice on the use of plant juices and milk to write secret messages.

Lemons were also used as organic inks by Arabs around 600 AD, and during the 16th century in Europe.

Giovanni Battista della Porta is credited with the first recipe for a sympathetic ink, derived from alum and vinegar, as well as the first book on secret writing and invisible inks, Magia Naturalis (1558, 1589). Since then, a wide variety of invisible inks have been used for all sorts of secretive purposes. A formula similar to oak gall ink was created by James Jay and used by George Washington and the Culper Spy Ring during the American Revolution and lemon juice was used by the 'Lemon Juice Spies' (Carl Muller and four other Germans, who all died for their efforts either by suicide or execution, along with John Hahn, an English baker) during World War I. In World War II, neutral or acidic solutions of phenolphthalein, a chemical compound extracted from pills for constipation, were used as invisible ink. It is colorless but turns pink when exposed to alkali such as ammonia and bicarbonate soda.

== General application and use ==
Invisible ink can be applied to a writing surface with a specialty purpose stylus, stamp, fountain pen, toothpick, calligraphy pen, Cotton swab, or even a finger dipped in the liquid. Once dry, the written surface looks as if it were blank, with a similar texture and reflectivity as the surrounding surface.

The ink can be later made visible by different methods according to the type of invisible ink used. The ink may be revealed by heat or by application of an appropriate chemical, or it may be made visible by viewing under ultraviolet light. Inks which are developed by a chemical reaction may depend on an acid-base reaction (like litmus paper), reactions similar to the blueprint process, or any of hundreds of others. Developer fluids may be applied using a spray bottle, but some developers are in the form of vapor, e.g. ammonia fumes used to develop phenolphthalein ink.

There are also toy invisible ink pens which have two tips—one tip for invisible ink writing, and another tip for developing the ink. Invisible ink is sometimes used to print parts of pictures or text in books for children to play with, always including a "decoder pen" which is used to show the invisible parts of texts or pictures, thus revealing answers to questions printed in regular ink or completing missing parts of pictures.

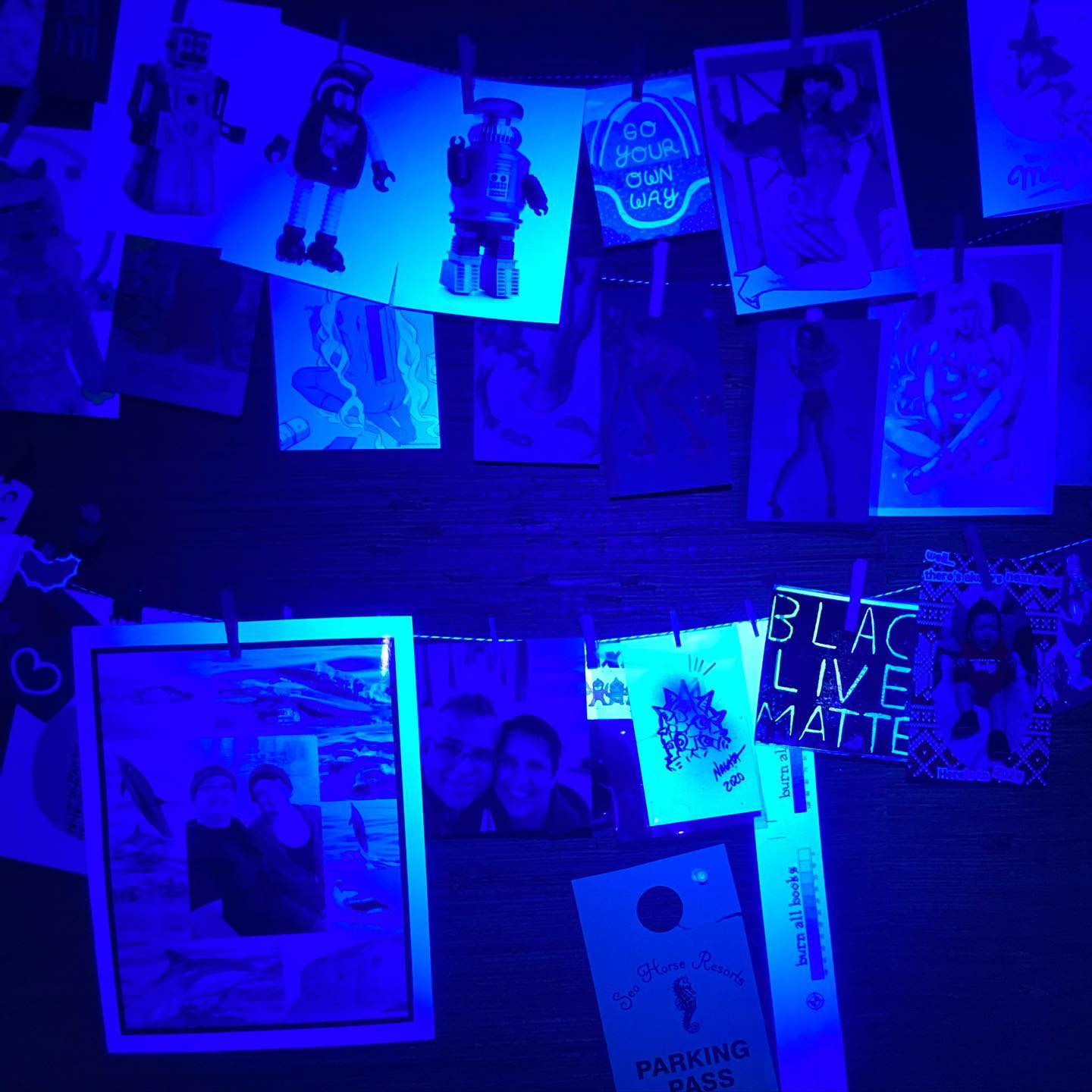
A common task in escape rooms is assemble an eye-safe blacklight torch to reveal messages in invisible ink

Security marker pens or UV markers with fluorescent ink that glows when illuminated with a UV light is often used to invisibly mark valuable household items in case of burglary. There are specialty security maker pens formulated for writing on non-porous surfaces such as glass, plastic, metal, etc. The mark can be read by using a blacklight or other UV light source. Security marker pens can be obtained commercially and are widely used as a crime countermeasure.

Some commercially available invisible inks glow very brightly, in a variety of colors, under ultraviolet light. This makes them suitable for use in readmission such as hand stamping.

There are some invisible ink types that can only be invisible when applied to certain types of surfaces, but are still visible on others.

Some vendors now offer invisible ink for use in computer inkjet printers. Such inks are usually visible under ultraviolet light. Typical uses include printing information on business forms for use by the form processor, without cluttering up the visible contents of the form. For example, some United States Postal Service mail sorting stations use UV-visible ink to print bar codes on mailed envelopes giving routing information for use by mail handling equipment further down the line before delivery.

An E2E voting system called Scantegrity II uses invisible ink to enable the voter to obtain a confirmation code only for the voted selection.

== Properties of an "ideal" invisible ink ==
What an "ideal" invisible ink is depends on its intended use. For example, property marking should ideally be done with ink easily read under ultraviolet light, whereas in espionage such an ink would be considered too easily detectable since a large number of letters may be screened relatively quickly using UV light.

Invisible inks are inherently "insecure" against a determined and well-equipped inspector, which must be balanced against the logistical difficulty in carrying out mass-screening of posted mail. It is easier to perform large-scale undetected screening of millions of electronic communications, than to mass-screen even a small fraction of conventional mail. Apart from in dictatorships where large numbers of personnel are employed to spy on fellow nationals, screening of posted mail is only feasible in particular situations, such as letters to and from a particular suspect or facility.

The British SOE training manual used in the Second World War identified the following properties of an "ideal" invisible ink:

1. Mixes with water.
2. Non-volatile, i.e. no pronounced smell.
3. Not depositing crystals on paper, i.e. not easily seen in glancing light.
4. Invisible under ultraviolet light.
5. Does not decompose or discolor the paper e.g. silver nitrate.
6. Nonreactive with iodine, or with any of the other usual developers.
7. Potential developers for the ink should be as few as possible.
8. Should not develop under heat.
9. Easily obtainable and has at least one plausible innocent use by the holder.
10. Not a compound of several chemicals, as this would violate No. 7.

From practical experience "6" and "9" were usually incompatible. SOE agents were trained not to risk their lives through reliance on insecure inks, most of which were from World War I. In general, SOE used invisible inks as a back-up method of communication when other, more secure communication techniques were unavailable. The agency was known to supply special inks to its field agents, rather than have them depend upon improvisation from obtainable everyday chemicals. When agents were forced to improvise, they were advised to dilute their invisible ink as much as possible to reduce chances of detection.

== Screening letters for secret messages ==
Any invisible ink can be made visible by someone who is sufficiently determined, but the limitation is generally time available and the fact that one cannot apply hours of effort to every single piece of paper. Thus successful use of invisible ink depends on not arousing suspicion that invisible ink may be present.

Telltale signs of invisible ink, such as pen scratches from a sharp pen, roughness, or changed reflectivity of the paper (either more dull or more shiny, usually from using undiluted ink), can be obvious to a careful observer who simply makes use of strong light, a magnifying glass and their nose. Also, key words in the visible letter, such as "heat" or any other odd code name, in an out of place context may alert a censor to the presence of invisible ink. Invisible ink is not effective with glossy or very smooth paper types, since the sizing of these papers prevents ink from being absorbed deep into the paper and it is easily visible, especially if the paper is examined under glancing light. There are, however, commercially available inks for non-porous surfaces that are only visible under ultraviolet light and are otherwise virtually invisible on such surfaces.

Using either ultraviolet light or an iodine fume cupboard, messages can be quickly screened for invisible ink and also read without first permanently developing the invisible ink. Thus, if a censor uses this method to intercept messages, the letter may then be sent to the intended recipient, who will be unaware that the secret message has already been intercepted by a third party.

A "screening station" theoretically could involve visual and olfactory inspection, an examination under ultraviolet light and then the heating of all objects in an oven before finally trying exposure to iodine fumes to produce optimal security in optimal time.

== Invisible ink types ==
For practical reasons, the inks are listed here according to their method of development. It must be understood however that some inks – particularly those of organic origin or those consisting of a mixture of several chemicals – may be made visible by several methods. For example, invisible writing with soap water may be made visible either by heat, reaction with phenolphthalein, viewing under ultraviolet light, or by placing the page inside an iodine fume cupboard.

=== Inks developed by heat ===
Some of these are organic substances that oxidize when heated, which usually turns them brown. For this type of "heat fixed" ink, any acidic fluid will work. The most secure way to use any of the following substances for invisible ink is by dilution, usually with water, close to the point when they become difficult to develop.

- Cola drink
- Honey solution, sugar (sugar turns into caramel by dehydration)
- Lemon, apple, orange or onion juice (organic acids and the paper forms ester under heat)
- Milk (lactose dehydrates)
- Bodily fluids such as blood serum.
- Soap solution (carboxylic partially oxidizes)
- Soybean juice
- Wine, or vinegar
- Cobalt chloride, which turns blue when heated and becomes invisible again after a while (if not overly heated)

The writing is rendered visible by heating the paper, either on a radiator, by ironing it, using a hair dryer, or by placing it in an oven. A 100-watt light bulb is less likely to damage the paper.

=== Inks developed by chemical reaction ===
In most cases, these substance changes color when mixed with an acid or base.

- Phenolphthalein, commonly used as a pH indicator, turns pink in the presence of a base such as ammonia fumes or sodium carbonate.
- Vinegar, is revealed by red cabbage water Vinegar contains acetic acid that affects the pH indicator in red cabbage water. Vinegar may also be developed by heat.
- Ammonia, developed by red cabbage water.
- Semen, developed.
- Copper sulfate, developed by sodium iodide, sodium carbonate, ammonium hydroxide or potassium ferricyanide.
- Lead(II) nitrate, developed by sodium iodide.
- Iron(II) sulfate, developed by sodium carbonate or potassium ferricyanate.
- Cobalt(II) chloride, developed by potassium ferricyanide.
- Iron(III) sulfate, developed by sodium sulfide.
- Starch, developed by iodine solution which turns starch dark blue and the paper light blue.
- Lemon juice, developed by iodine solution (ink turns white, paper turns light blue).
- Sodium chloride (common table salt), developed by silver nitrate.
- Cerium oxalate developed by manganese sulfate and hydrogen peroxide

=== Inks visible under ultraviolet light ===
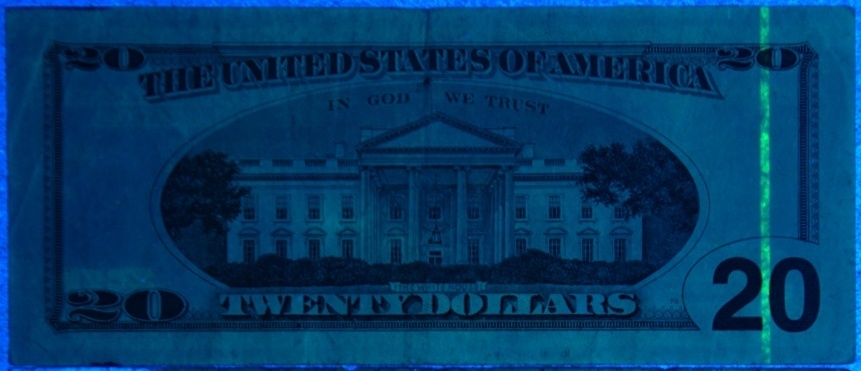
A US$20 bill showing a visible stripe under an ultraviolet light

Some inks glow faintly (fluoresce) when under an ultraviolet lamp. This is a property of many substances, particularly organic substances and body fluids.

Other inks work in a near opposite way by absorbing ultraviolet light but without fluorescing. When these are used on fluorescent paper, the inked areas fluoresce less than the surrounding paper area when under an ultraviolet lamp. This is especially a property of inks with a yellow tint.

Some UV-visible inks may be detected on a photocopy, due to the relatively strong ultraviolet component in light from the photocopier scanning head.

Examples of inks revealed by ultraviolet light are:

- Laundry detergents containing optical brighteners
- Soap
- Body fluids, serum, saliva
- Sunscreen
- Lemon juice

=== Inks which alter the surface of paper ===
This includes virtually all invisible inks, but pure distilled water can also be used in this way. Application of any fluid will alter the paper surface fibers or sizing.

Fumes created from heating iodine crystals will develop the writing, which will appear brown because the iodine sticks preferentially to the altered areas of the paper. Exposing the paper to strong sunlight will return the writing to its invisible state, as will using a bleach solution.

Slightly dampening paper with a sponge or by steam and then drying it before writing a message will prevent writing from being developed by this method, but overdoing dampening will result in telltale paper cockling.

== Modern usage ==
Former MI6 agent Richard Tomlinson stated that Pentel Rolling Writer rollerball pens were extensively used by MI-6 agents to produce secret writing in the form of invisible messages while on missions.

In 2002, a gang was indicted for spreading a riot between federal penitentiaries using coded telephone messages, and messages in invisible ink.

=== United States declassification of invisible ink recipes ===
In 1995, President Clinton issued an executive order requesting that all agencies declassify information 25 years or older by the year 2000. Six World War I documents referencing the recipes for invisible ink were due to be declassified under this order, including:

- Secret Inks
- Detection of Secret Ink
- German Secret Ink Formula
- Pamphlet on Invisible Photography and Writing

In 1999, however, the Central Intelligence Agency (CIA) successfully exempted these documents, arguing that the recipes provided the basis for more advanced formulas still in use at the time. This exemption made the recipes for invisible ink the oldest classified documents held by the National Archives until their declassification in 2011. At this time, the CIA no longer considered the documents sensitive due to recent advancements in technology.

=== Invisible ink in art ===
Invisible ink is not commonly used in art. Some artists, however, have incorporated invisible ink into their work, either alone or in conjunction with more conventional media.

Jean-Michel Basquiat is known to have worked with invisible ink. In 2012, Sotheby's London discovered Basquiat's signature painted in invisible ink on the 1982 work, Orange Sports Figure. In 2018, analysis by an art conservator revealed invisible ink markings on an untitled Basquiat painting from 1981.

In 2012, the Hayward Gallery exhibition, Invisible: Art about the Unseen, 1957-2012, included the 1989 work, Magic Ink, by Gianni Motti. It consisted of two drawings created with undeveloped invisible ink.

In 2015, Aowen Jin exhibited artwork drawn in invisible ink at the Horniman Museum in London. The illustrations, drawn on the walls and floor of the Music Gallery Performance Space, were only visible under UV light.

=== Invisible ink online ===
In addition to traditional chemical methods, modern digital techniques utilize Unicode characters to create invisible text, enabling hidden messages within standard text formats.

== Disappearing inks ==
Inks that are visible for a period of time without the intention of being made visible again are called disappearing inks. They typically rely on the chemical reaction between thymolphthalein and a basic substance such as sodium hydroxide. Thymolphthalein is normally colorless, but turns blue in solution with the base. As the base reacts with carbon dioxide (always present in the air), the pH drops below 10.5 and the color disappears. Pens are also available whose inks can be thoroughly erased by swiping a special pen over the original text. Disappearing inks have been used in gag squirtguns, for limited-time secret messages, for security reasons on non-reusable passes, for fraudulent purposes, and for dress-making and other crafts where measurement marks are required to disappear.
