= Starcross (video game) =

1982 video game

- Developer: Infocom
- Publisher: Infocom
- Designer: Dave Lebling
- Engine: Z-machine
- Platforms: Amiga, Amstrad CPC, Amstrad PCW, Apple II, Atari ST, Atari 8-bit, Commodore 64, IBM PC, DOS, Plus/4, TRS-80, TI-99/4A
- Release: Release 15: September 1, 1982; Release 17: October 21, 1982
- Genre: Interactive fiction
- Mode: Single-player

Starcross is an interactive fiction game written by Dave Lebling and published in 1982 by Infocom. The game was released for the IBM PC (as a self-booting disk), Apple II, Atari 8-bit computers, Commodore 64, TRS-80, TI-99/4A, and later the Atari ST and Amiga. It was Infocom's fifth game and first in the science fiction genre. Starcross takes place in the year 2186, when the player's character is a lone black hole miner exploring an asteroid belt. It sold 90,315 copies.

== Gameplay ==
The player's ship, the Starcross, is fitted with a mass detector to look for "quantum black holes", which are such powerful sources of energy that one could provide a wealth of riches. When the mass detector finally discovers an anomaly, however, it is not a black hole but something else entirely: a massive craft of unknown origin and composition.

The player must dock with the mysterious ship and gain entry to its interior. Once inside, the player discovers a wide variety of alien plant and animal species and an array of unfamiliar technology. Starcross has an appearance in Zork: The Undiscovered Underground.

Starcross has 39 ways to die.

== Release ==
The original release of Starcross was packaged in a round, plastic UFO. Besides the disk and manual, it contained some physical items:

1. Log of the M.C.S. Starcross, a journal of the protagonist's experiences on the ship
2. A letter from the "Bureau of Extra-Solar Intelligence" providing advice for any encounters with alien lifeforms
3. A partial space map of charted masses, including instructions on how to use the navigation computer

== Reception ==
Jerry Pournelle wrote in BYTE in 1983 of Starcross, "I am not fond of it as I am of Zork, but a number of science-fiction fans like it very much".
