= Mike Verdu =

American manager and producer and author of computer games

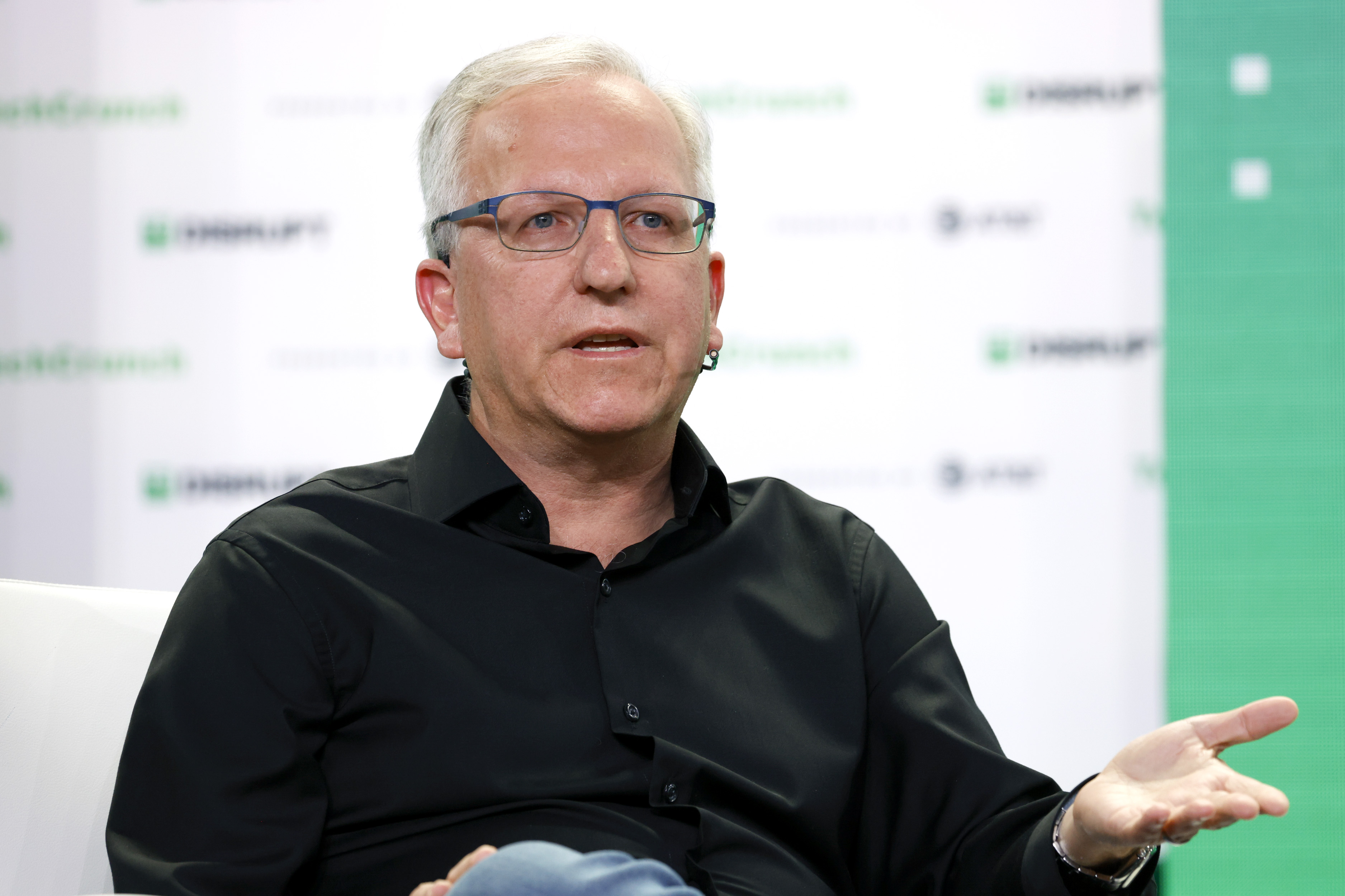
- Verdu in 2022
- Born: Michael Verdu; December 28, 1964 (age 61); Washington, D.C., United States
- Citizenship: American
- Occupations: Game producer Game author Vice president at Netflix
- Notable work: Mission Critical

Michael Verdu (born December 28, 1964) is an American manager and producer and author of computer games.

== Life ==
Verdu was born on December 28, 1964. His father worked for a trade union, his mother was a dance instructor. Michael visited the Rensselaer Polytechnic Institute in Troy, 600 km away from his native Washington. He did not finish his studies because Advanced Technology, an IT service provider for the US Department of Defense, offered him a lucrative job as a programmer. Aged 20, he left Advanced Technology in 1985 to found the software company Paragon Systems that produced software for the Department of Defense. Paragon's programs were used to maintain submarines of the Ohio and Los Angeles-class submarines. The company also rented out programming capacities, for example to Bob Bates' video game start-up Challenge Inc. which developed text adventures for industry leader Infocom. In September 1987 Verdu sold Paragon Systems (which had 25 employees by the time) to IT service provider American Systems Corporation where he worked as the business unit director for software development for the following three years.

When defense budgets dwindled down with the end of the Cold War, Verdu turned his passion for computer games into a profession and founded the video game development studio Legend Entertainment together with Bob Bates who in the meantime was affected by the shutdown of Infocom. Legend Entertainment produced text adventures and acted as its own publisher. Verdu was the CEO of the company and remained on this position until the company was sold to GT Interactive in 1998. After the acquisition Legend Entertainment was integrated into GT Interactive's production line as a studio and remained so when Infogrames bought GT in 1999. Verdu and Bates acted as the studio heads, with the studio focussing on the production of first person shooters.

From July 2002 until May 2009 Verdu worked for EA Los Angeles, first as producer, then from 2005 on as division director for real-time strategy games, and from 2007 on as vice president/general manager. During his seven years at EA Los Angeles he was responsible for titles such as Command & Conquer 3: Tiberium Wars or The Lord of the Rings: The Battle for Middle-earth II. From June 2009 until August 2012 Verdu worked as Chief Creative Officer for American browser game publisher Zynga. At this time Zynga had a market value of about nine billion dollars. In September 2012 he left Zynga to found the independent studio TapZen. The starting capital was provided by his former employer, later on Chinese tech corporation Tencent acquired a financial interest. In January 2015 TapZen was bought up by browser and mobile games producer Kabam. The Canadians hired Verdu as Chief Creative Officer for the mother company.

When Kabam was bought up by South Korean video game company Netmarble Verdu went back to Electronic Arts, this time as senior vice president of EA Mobile. From May 2019 on he was vice president of content for augmented reality and virtual reality at the Oculus division of Facebook. In July 2021 he was hired by Netflix as vice president, responsible for their upcoming video game branch.

Verdu is married and lives in California.

== Works ==
In games business, Verdu mainly laid the focus on being a manager and producer. During the ten years as CEO of Legend Entertainment he engaged in creative activities as well though. Mission Critical (1995) was the only narrative game he completely wrote himself. He was involved in writing the scripts for Gateway and Gateway II: Homeworld and the development of the ego shooter Unreal II: The Awakening; his share of the work on Gateway II was about 50%.

Verdu started the Legend Entertainment tradition to obtain licenses for literary works and use them as a blueprint for games. When the company faced the problem of having only two full-time authors (Bob Bates and Steve Meretzky) and thus having too little capacities for producing new games, Verdu suggested licensing existing stories to save time on game design. As a fan of the works of Frederik Pohl he brought up the idea of using Pohl's Gateway trilogy as a blueprint for a game. Bob Bates made use of his contacts back from Infocom times and organized the license. Verdu suggested himself as the author for the implementation. He had no previous experience in this metier, but Legend found a way to canalise Verdu's thirst for action: The writing of the script was shared between three unexperienced but enthusiastic authors (Verdu, programmer Glen Dahlgren and producer and musician Michael Lindner) who were supervised by Bates. This way of working worked well, Gateway was well received by the media. Other conventional writers whose works were licensed to Legend for conversions to computer games were Piers Anthony (Companions of Xanth), Terry Brooks (Shannara) and Spider Robinson (Callahan's Crosstime Saloon).

In Mission Critical Verdu delved into the topics of evolution and the potential of artificial intelligence. His central issue was how humanity could deal with the awakening of artificial intelligence as an actual new lifeform, not as an anthropomorphic reflection of humans as seen in literature. In this context Verdu sees the current stage of evolution as an intermediate form within the frame of a further evolution.

== Reception ==
American Byte magazine named Mission Critical game of the year 1995. During the "Year in Review 1995" awards hosted by US magazine Computer Game Review Mission Critical won in the categories "Adventure of the Year" and "Best Graphics of the Year".

== Games ==
- 1990: Spellcasting 101 (producer, Legend Entertainment)
- 1991: Timequest (co-producer, Legend Entertainment)
- 1992: Frederik Pohl's Gateway (co-producer, Legend Entertainment)
- 1993: Gateway II: Homeworld (co-producer, Legend Entertainment)
- 1993: Eric the Unready (co-producer, Legend Entertainment)
- 1994: Superhero League of Hoboken (co-producer, Legend Entertainment)
- 1995: Mission Critical (author, Legend Entertainment)
- 1999: The Wheel of Time (co-producer, Legend Entertainment)
- 1999: Unreal Mission Pack 1: Return to Na Pali (producer, Legend Entertainment)
- 2003: Unreal II: The Awakening (author, Legend Entertainment)
- 2006: The Lord of the Rings: The Battle for Middle-earth II (producer, EA Los Angeles)
- 2007: Command & Conquer 3: Tiberium Wars (producer, EA Los Angeles)
