= Callahan's Crosstime Saloon (video game) =

1997 video game

- Developer: Legend Entertainment
- Publisher: Take-Two Interactive
- Designer: Josh Mandel
- Series: Callahan's Crosstime Saloon
- Platform: MS-DOS
- Release: April 16, 1997
- Genre: Graphic adventure
- Mode: Single-player

Callahan's Crosstime Saloon is a 1997 graphic adventure game developed by Legend Entertainment and published by Take-Two Interactive. Based on the Callahan's Place book series by author Spider Robinson, the game follows Jake Stonebender, narrator of the books, through six discrete comic science fiction adventures. Taking the role of Jake, the player solves puzzles, converses with characters from the Callahan's Place series and visits locations such as the Amazon rainforest, Transylvania and outer space.

Callahan's Crosstime Saloon began development at Legend in 1995, under the direction of Josh Mandel, co-designer of Freddy Pharkas: Frontier Pharmacist. Mandel had considered adapting the Callahan's Place books since the 1980s, and saw the project as an answer to the dark and violent content of games in the mid-1990s. Robinson was initially uninterested in the game's development, but increasingly collaborated with Mandel as it progressed. First planned as a self-published title, Callahan's Crosstime Saloon switched to publisher Take-Two late in development, and was subsequently mismarketed as a work of Western fiction.

The game was a commercial failure, although Mandel was pleased with its reception by fans of Robinson's books. It received positive reviews from critics. Callahan's Crosstime Saloon became Mandel's last project at Legend Entertainment, and was the company's penultimate adventure game, followed by John Saul's Blackstone Chronicles (1998).

== Gameplay ==
Standing inside Callahan's Place, the player highlights the character Mickey Finn with the game's pop-up menu, which offers the verbs "look at" and "talk to". An inventory bar appears on the bottom half of the screen, and the fireplace bullseye is visible in the background.

The player controls Jake Stonebender (narrator of the book) through a series of bizarre adventures. Included in the game are several songs performed by Spider Robinson himself; these can be heard by talking to the pianist in the bar and asking for "one of your specialties".

== Plot ==
Callahan's Crosstime Saloon uses the titular saloon as a hub world. The player controls Jake Stonebender and assists five regulars with their individual crises. Completing the first three quests unlocks access to the remaining two, which triggers the final chapter.

=== Pyotr's Heartbreak ===
Pyotr, the saloon's resident vampire, departs for Transylvania following the loss of his long time lover to another man. The quest involves traveling to the region and navigating a monster-filled parallel version of Callahan's Saloon.

=== Squish's Space Mission ===
Squish, an alien regular, learns of his species' plan to bombard Earth with testosterone-inhibiting rays. The quest requires traveling into outer space with Noah, a retired bomb squad officer, to sabotage the alien technology and prevent the attack.

=== Josie's Chocolate ===
Josie, a time traveler, seeks to restore an extinct South American plant known for producing superior chocolate. The quest involves confronting Faston Casteroga, an industrialist whose pencil conglomerate is destroying the rainforest, and traveling into the jungle to recover the plant.

=== Rescuing Ralph von Wau Wau ===
Ralph von Wau Wau, a talking German Shepherd, has been abducted by the government for classified experiments. The quest requires infiltrating a heavily fortified mountain facility to extract the dog.

=== Al Phee's Future Mind-Trip ===
Al Phee, a time-traveling con artist, has developed uncontrollable telepathy after exposure to mind-reading drugs in a dystopian future. The quest involves traveling to this future society and locating a doctor capable of removing the curse.

=== The Finale ===
After completing the five quests, cosmic administrators announce the universe will be shut down due to budget constraints. Jake and the saloon's regulars travel to a divine courthouse to defend humanity's continued existence. The compassion Jake displayed during the five missions serves as legal precedent for humanity's survival.

== Development ==
=== Origins ===
In late 1995, Legend Entertainment secured the rights to develop a comic science fiction adventure game based on the Callahan's Place stories by Spider Robinson, and chose the name Callahan's Crosstime Saloon initially as its working title. The project was led by Josh Mandel, designer of the earlier games Freddy Pharkas: Frontier Pharmacist and Space Quest 6 by Sierra On-Line. Mandel had first discovered Robinson's work in the early 1980s, when he opened Time Travelers Strictly Cash at an airport. Believing the Callahan's stories to be a good fit for the adventure genre, Mandel considered the idea of adapting them "for a decade" and pitched the concept to Sierra during his time at the company, where he had begun to work in 1990. However, the idea was not accepted; he later said that Sierra president Ken Williams was "strongly committed to establishing Sierra's characters, rather than using licensed properties".

"It seems like every game I play these days is about monsters, murder, destruction, and evil. I wanted something uplifting, something that would take place in a world I wanted to live in, rather than one I wanted to escape from."

— Designer Josh Mandel in 1997

Mandel's chance to create Callahan's Crosstime Saloon came after his departure from Sierra, which he left during the development of Space Quest 6 because of his distaste for the company's changing corporate culture. He joined Legend Entertainment, a studio known for adapting literary licenses, and proceeded to help with Mission Critical and Shannara. Eventually, the developer appointed him to direct an adventure game based on The Belgariad, but author David Eddings ultimately rejected the company's proposal. Legend co-founders Bob Bates and Mike Verdu then asked Mandel to select two potential authors to adapt, so that the company could begin a new project after the failure of The Belgariad. He chose Robinson and Dean Koontz, his favorites at the time, and Legend opted for the former.

Mandel's core goals with Callahan's Crosstime Saloon were to make a title with a "strongly positive theme", in contrast to other games of the period, and to produce an adventure game that paired the "depth and playability" of text-based interactive fiction with the visuals and interface of a newer graphic adventure. The optimism of Robinson's work provided the foundation for the former goal. Alongside these objectives, Mandel hoped to top the animation and graphics of Legend's earlier titles, and to capture the adult attitude of Robinson's books. The game was planned from the start to be character-driven; Steve Bauman of Computer Games Strategy Plus reported in 1995 that its central theme was "[r]eal people with real problems." According to Mandel, Robinson's short story collections also supplied the basis for the game's episodic structure, a design decision he believed was necessary to capture the Callahan's Place style. He was hesitant to adopt the structure at first, as it was highly unconventional for a computer game. By November 1995, Callahan's Crosstime Saloon was set to include 10 episodes and was planned for a mid-1996 release. The number of episodes had dropped to nine by December.

=== Production ===
In adapting the Callahan's Place books for computers, Josh Mandel described feeling "a huge responsibility in the temporary custody I had been granted with these characters", in part thanks to the "terrifying omnipresent knowledge" that its protective fans would be critical of a game unfaithful to Spider Robinson's work. The books' audience was small but passionate, and the alt.callahans Usenet newsgroup was in the top 1-2% most popular online at the time, with a membership in excess of 60,000. Despite this concern, Mandel found it creatively freeing to use pre-defined characters and backstories that he could develop in new directions. The game was not based on any particular Callahan's Place work, but rather used the books as a starting point for new stories. According to Mandel, the decision to break from the series' universal setting of Callahan's bar came early: he found it "unnecessarily literal" to limit the game to a single area, and unrealistic to include puzzles in the bargoers' past-tense flashback sequences. Instead he invented roughly 40 new locations for the episodic stories, populated by between 40 and 50 original characters. The only locations borrowed directly from Robinson's writing were the parking lot, interior and roof of Callahan's bar, which Mandel populated with pre-existing characters from the Callahan's Place books.

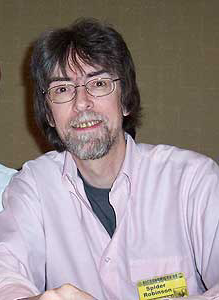
Author Spider Robinson (pictured in 2004) grew increasingly involved with Callahan's Crosstime Saloon as development progressed.

Spider Robinson was initially uninvolved in Callahan's Crosstime Saloon; he requested only that Mike Callahan not be depicted as thin, which an earlier cover artist for the books had done. Robinson did not play computer games or use the Internet, and he later said that he "planned to spend the money and ignore the results." This arrangement made Mandel uneasy, as it increased the game's chances of drifting away from Robinson's vision. In response, Mandel later said, "[E]arly on in the design process, I began to write or call him, especially when making decisions that affected the history and lives of his characters". As development progressed, Robinson's involvement heavily increased, and he began to speak with Mandel between three and four times weekly about the game. Mandel said that Robinson was open and supportive regarding additions to the series, which they discussed early in each section's creation. Only a planned backstory for Doc Webster was removed because of these discussions, as it conflicted with part of the upcoming Callahan's Legacy book.

Legend Entertainment was a small development house of only 13 employees when Mandel joined, and the Callahan's Crosstime Saloon team reached 22 members by late 1996. The company did not employ in-house composers or an art staff; audiovisual production was hired out to contractors. As a designer, Mandel called his switch to Legend from Sierra "a very difficult transition", as he was the only developer at the company who did not know how to program. Game design documents at Legend were written in a "pseudocode" format rather than in plain text, and the company was unused to working in the style Mandel had used at Sierra. This resulted in communication problems, and Mandel later said, "I felt [for a long time] like I was out of my depth, that my smaller range of talents was problematic". He had moved to Virginia to join the team, and lived on a farm in the countryside. According to Mandel, the Legend office often held design meetings wherein "almost the entire company was invited to review your game design and pick it apart" throughout development, whereas Sierra designers were often left to themselves until late in the production cycle.

Mandel worked at Legend's main office "maybe 10-12 hours a day, 5 or 6 days a week" during the first half of development for Callahan's Crosstime Saloon. However, after it came time to focus mostly on its writing, he stayed at home and kept a schedule of "about 10am 'til 2 or 3am, 7 days a week". Mandel later described the writing period for Callahan's Crosstime Saloon as "one of the darkest periods of my life", as he was suffering from a deep depression. He worked, ate and slept in a Sky Chair suspended from his living room ceiling, which he left only rarely. He kept a phone nearby, and a series of ropes allowed him to manipulate his garage door without leaving the chair, so that he could let his dog outside. In 2013, Mandel said that Callahan's Crosstime Saloon was at the time "the one thing that I had any drive at all to accomplish." While writing the game, Mandel built carefully from the existing books and sought not to introduce inconsistencies with the series' canon.

Legend Entertainment displayed Callahan's Crosstime Saloon at the 1996 Electronic Entertainment Expo (E3) in June. Seeing the game at the show, a writer for Computer Games Strategy Plus remarked, "We're betting on this one."

=== Switch to Take-Two and final months ===
Callahan's Crosstime Saloon was initially set to be self-published by Legend Entertainment, but the company began to transition away from publishing in mid-1996, when it offloaded sections of its business to Random House's RandomSoft branch. By the time of Legend's deal to develop Unreal II in October 1998, Bob Bates said that the company's business strategy had become a "transition from [being] a middle-tier publisher to a top-tier developer". In September 1996, Legend signed the publishing rights for Callahan's Crosstime Saloon over to Take-Two Interactive, which wanted the project as part of its effort to expand and diversify its portfolio. According to Take-Two, the deal entailed a $500,000 advance payment to Legend, and a guarantee to pay Legend royalties of 25% for each domestic sale and 50% for sales abroad. By October, Callahan's Crosstime Saloon was set for a January 1997 release.

Josh Mandel felt that the game was rushed in its final months, and that the team ultimately "ran out of time." According to Robinson, Josh Mandel arrived with a beta version of Callahan's Crosstime Saloon before its release, and they played it together for at least eight hours. Robinson highly enjoyed the result.

According to Mandel, Callahan's Crosstime Saloon was developed on a small budget, and Legend's situation grew "very bleak financially towards the end" of the game's creation. Its cost ultimately totaled around $1 million. During his time at the studio, Mandel had to pay for certain aspects of development personally because of fluctuations in company resources. He later noted that the team's relationship with Take-Two was troubled, and that the publisher "reneged on contracts and payments", among other concerns. In preparation for the game's release, Take-Two incorrectly advertised Callahan's Crosstime Saloon as a work of Western fiction, a mistake that Mandel claimed had occurred "because nobody at the company [had] bothered to play it — or even ASK what it's about — before publishing it." Calling Take-Two "the bottom of the barrel of the games industry", Mandel also accused the publisher of failing to market Callahan's Crosstime Saloon past January 1997 and of creating substandard packaging for the project. The game ultimately shipped on April 16, 1997, and was launched without a press release from its publisher. According to Mandel, Take-Two mistakenly produced and released the unfinished beta of Callahan's Crosstime Saloon rather its completed gold master, an event he later called the worst moment of his game career.

== Reception ==
Reception

Review scores
Publication	Score
Computer Games Strategy Plus	4/5
Computer Gaming World	4.5/5
GameSpot	6.1/10
PC Gamer (US)	86%
PC PowerPlay	80%
Computer Game Entertainment	85/100

According to Spider Robinson, Callahan's Crosstime Saloon was a commercial failure. Discussing its sales performance, he noted that it "started out slow... but then it tapered right off." Richard Cobbett of Rock, Paper, Shotgun later wrote that the game "slipped instantly into obscurity", which he blamed on its marketing effort by Take-Two Interactive. Poor sales meant that no Macintosh version was developed, and Robinson, a Macintosh user, subsequently never played Callahan's Crosstime Saloon after its release. However, Josh Mandel was pleased with the game's reception by fans of the Callahan's Place books. In 2011, Adventure Gamers named Callahan's Crosstime Saloon the 66th-best adventure game ever released.

Reviewing Callahan's Crosstime Saloon for Computer Gaming World, Charles Ardai called it "a wonderful, wonderful, wonderful game" that "left me with one of the biggest damn smiles a computer game has ever put on my face." Morgana of Computer Games Strategy Plus wrote, "For me, and others like me who value playability, story, and intelligence above ocular diabetes, Callahan's is a find."

In PC Gamer US, T. Liam McDonald remarked that the game's humor is inconsistent, but that "in the final tally the funny and unfunny are balanced enough to keep things entertaining." He summarized the game as "a winner." Shane Mooney of Computer Game Entertainment found the game easy and its puzzles somewhat arbitrary, noting that the developers did not "seamlessly integrate them into the game's tapestry." However, he concluded, "For those who prefer to be entertained over challenged, this is the funniest adventure game of this year."

=== Legacy ===
Writing for Rock Paper Shotgun in 2016, Richard Cobbett praised the humor of Josh Mandel, and blamed publisher Take Two that "[this] truly excellent adventure slipped instantly into obscurity". Cobbett highlighted the game again for PC Gamer, contrasting its technological limits with its "great characters, packed locations, superb background detail, endless throwaway jokes, and ... cheesy one-liners". Kurt Kalata of Hardcore Gaming 101 also noted it as the most underrated adventure game of all time, celebrating the game's writing and depth.

== Aftermath ==
Following the release of Callahan's Crosstime Saloon, Josh Mandel quit Legend Entertainment. He later said that he had become "extremely depressed about" Take-Two's handling of the game, and felt that his lack of coding knowledge would make him a "financial drain" at the small and troubled Legend, as he did not expect to receive another designer position for some time. Instead, he became a freelancer and worked for other companies on games such as Jagged Alliance 2, Crash of the Titans, Insecticide and Leisure Suit Larry: Reloaded. In 1998, Legend proceeded to release its final adventure game, John Saul's Blackstone Chronicles. Thereafter, the studio sold to publisher GT Interactive and changed its focus to developing shooter games such as Unreal II: The Awakening and The Wheel of Time. GT was ultimately purchased by Infogrames, which later changed its name to Atari. In January 2004, Atari opted to shutter Legend.

== See also ==
- The Space Bar
