= Thaumistry: In Charm's Way =

2017 video game

Thaumistry: In Charm’s Way
- Designer: Bob Bates
- Engine: TADS 3
- Platforms: Microsoft Windows, OS X, Linux, Android, iOS
- Release: October 7, 2017
- Genre: Interactive fiction
- Mode: Single player

Thaumistry: In Charm's Way is an interactive fiction video game developed by Bob Bates, designer of Sherlock: The Riddle of the Crown Jewels and Arthur: The Quest for Excalibur.

== Plot ==
Set in New York City, the game follows Eric Knight, a man unknown of his magical powers, where odd things happen around him. Other people like him exist known as Bodgers, magic users who create small mishaps that will allow something big to go right. An immediate threat is about to happen that will expose the existence of Bodgers to the non-magic world, and Eric explores his identity as a magic user and will explore whether he is a Bodger and whether he'd want to become one.

== Development ==
Bob Bates had been working on the game for 11 years by himself and in January, 2017, launched a Kickstarter to help fund it so he could finish it. Designers Steve Meretzky, Tim Schafer, and Al Lowe helped with the Kickstarter project's video. Bates was encouraged to use Kickstarter to crowd-fund it after seeing other successes like Broken Age, Obduction, and Thimbleweed Park. The project's funding had ended on February 21, having successfully raised $35,238 from 1,053 backers. Originally scheduled for release in July 2017, the game was released on Steam on October 7, 2017.

== Reception ==
Adventure Gamers reviewed the game positively, awarding it four out of five stars calling it a "lighthearted text romp that casts its entertaining puzzle magic on the modern era." though stated that some of its elements went underused and that the all-text presentation may be off putting for some gamers.
