= Bob Bates =

American computer game designer

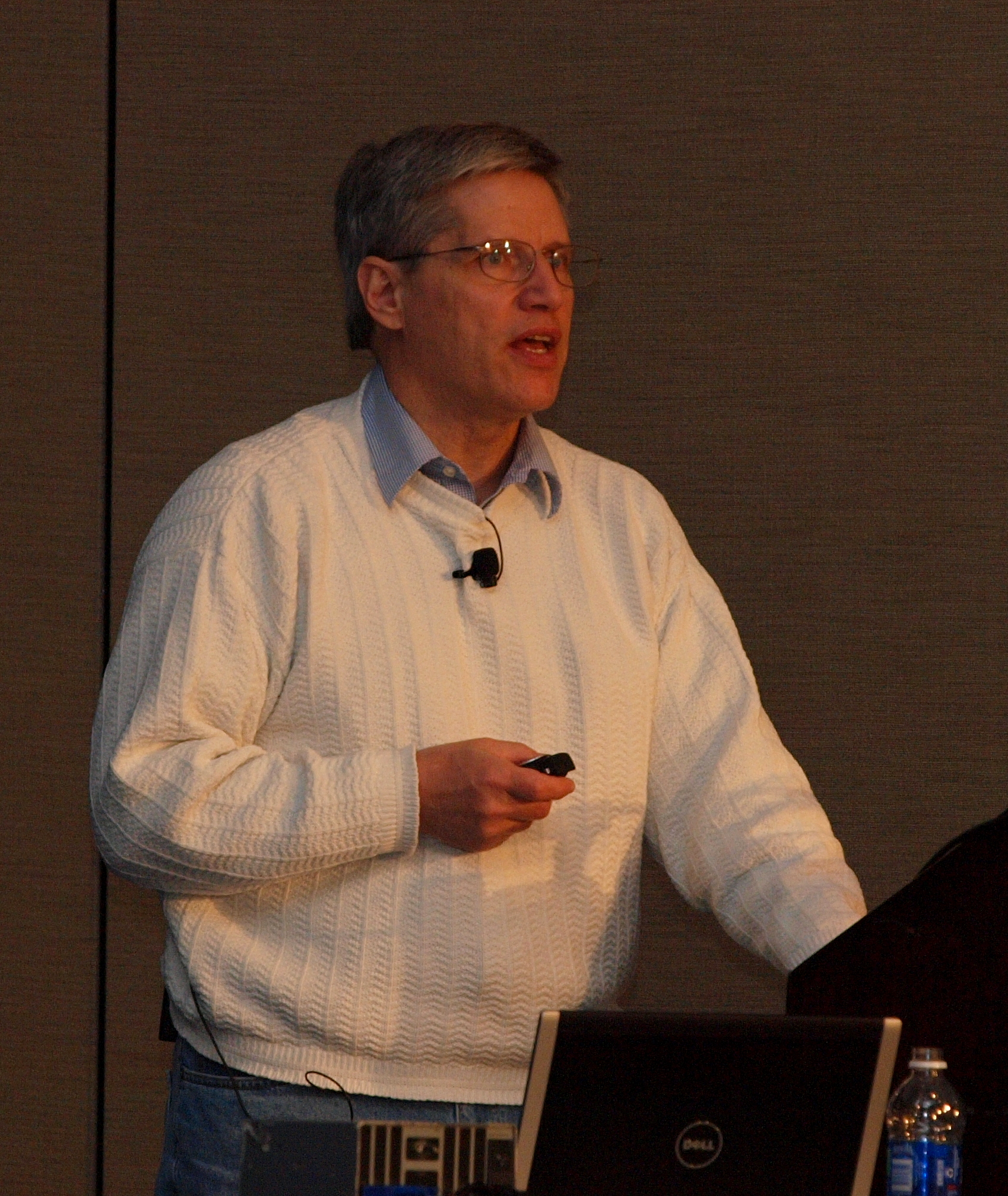
- Bates in March 2010
- Born: Robert Bates; December 11, 1953 (age 72); Greenbelt, Maryland, U.S.
- Education: Georgetown University (AB)
- Occupation: Video game designer
- Employer(s): Challenge, Inc., Infocom (publisher), Legend Entertainment, Zynga
- Known for: Co-founder of Challenge, Inc. and Legend Entertainment
- Notable work: Sherlock: The Riddle of the Crown Jewels; Arthur: The Quest for Excalibur; Timequest; Eric the Unready; Unreal II: The Awakening
- Spouse: Peggy Oriani (m. 1978)
- Children: 2

Robert Bates (born December 11, 1953) is an American video game designer. One of the early designers of interactive fiction games, he was co-founder of Challenge, Inc., which created games in the 1980s for the pioneering company Infocom. After Infocom's dissolution in 1989, Bates co-founded Legend Entertainment to continue publishing games in the Infocom tradition, but with added graphics. Notable games that he has designed, written, or produced include Unreal II (2003), Spider-Man 3 (2007), and Eric the Unready (1993), listed as Adventure Game of the Year by Computer Gaming World magazine and also included on the 1996 list of "150 best games of all time". In 1998 he wrote the award-winning game Quandaries for the U.S. Department of Justice. He has twice been the chairperson of the International Game Developers Association, which honored him with a Lifetime Achievement Award in 2010. Bates has written extensively about game design and development in works such as the 2001 book Game Design: The Art and Business of Creating Games, which is commonly used as a game design textbook in college courses. From 2011–2014, Bates was Chief Creative Officer for External Studios at Zynga. He continues to work as an independent consultant with various publishers in the games industry.

== Career ==
Bates was born in 1953 in Greenbelt, Maryland, the fourth of eight children to Frances and James Bates. His father was a mathematician, who from 1963–1967 moved the family to Cheltenham, England. Upon returning to the United States, Bob attended DeMatha High School in Hyattsville, Maryland, graduating in 1971, and then went on to Georgetown University, where he pursued a double major in philosophy and psychology, receiving his Bachelor of Arts degree in philosophy in 1975. His first job after college was as tour guide for Washington Group Tours, a job he took since it allowed him free time between tours to pursue his writing efforts. After marrying Peggy Oriani in 1978 he founded his own tour company, Potomac Tours. In 1982, with the approach of his 30th birthday, he sold the company to spend two years writing a novel, though did not finish. It was around this time that Bates's father gave his old TRS-80 computer to his son, to help with the novel-writing. With the computer, Bates received a copy of the interactive fiction game Zork, and immediately fell in love with the genre, seeing it as a way that he could pursue a writing career, making games. In 1986, Bates and a friend, David Wilt, who he knew because they sang in the same choir, the Alexandria Harmonizers, started the company Challenge, Inc. to explore the possibilities of creating interactive fiction games. Needing an engine for these games, Bates reached out to the Zork publisher, Infocom, to see about licensing their fiction engine Z-machine. Several weeks later, Infocom and Challenge had worked out a development deal, with Bates doing the design/writing, the coding being done by two contract programmers from Paragon Systems, and the publishing/marketing being done under the Infocom name. Bates envisioned a game series entitled "Immortal Legends", with his first two published game designs being the interactive fiction titles Sherlock: The Riddle of the Crown Jewels (1988) and Arthur: The Quest for Excalibur (1989), on which he was both designer and writer. A third game about Robin Hood was never finished because Infocom was dissolved by its parent company Activision in 1989.

A few months after the end of Infocom, Bates and Mike Verdu (the head of Paragon Systems, which had since been acquired by American Systems Corp) founded Legend Entertainment to produce games in the Infocom tradition. The company was backed by ASC, and located in their facility in Chantilly, Virginia. Games designed by Bates for Legend included Timequest, Eric the Unready, and John Saul's Blackstone Chronicles. He also contributed design and writing to other company games, including the Gateway series and the company's final game Unreal II: The Awakening. In 1998 Legend was acquired by GT Interactive, which itself was acquired by Infogrames, later renamed as Atari. In 2004, Legend was closed. Bates then went on to do independent consulting until 2011 when he was hired by Mike Verdu, then at Zynga, to be Chief Creative Officer for External Developers, a job Bates held until early 2014, at which point he returned to independent consulting.

In 2017, Bates launched a Kickstarter for his game Thaumistry: In Charm’s Way, which was successfully funded having raised $35,238 from 1,053 backers.

== Recognition ==
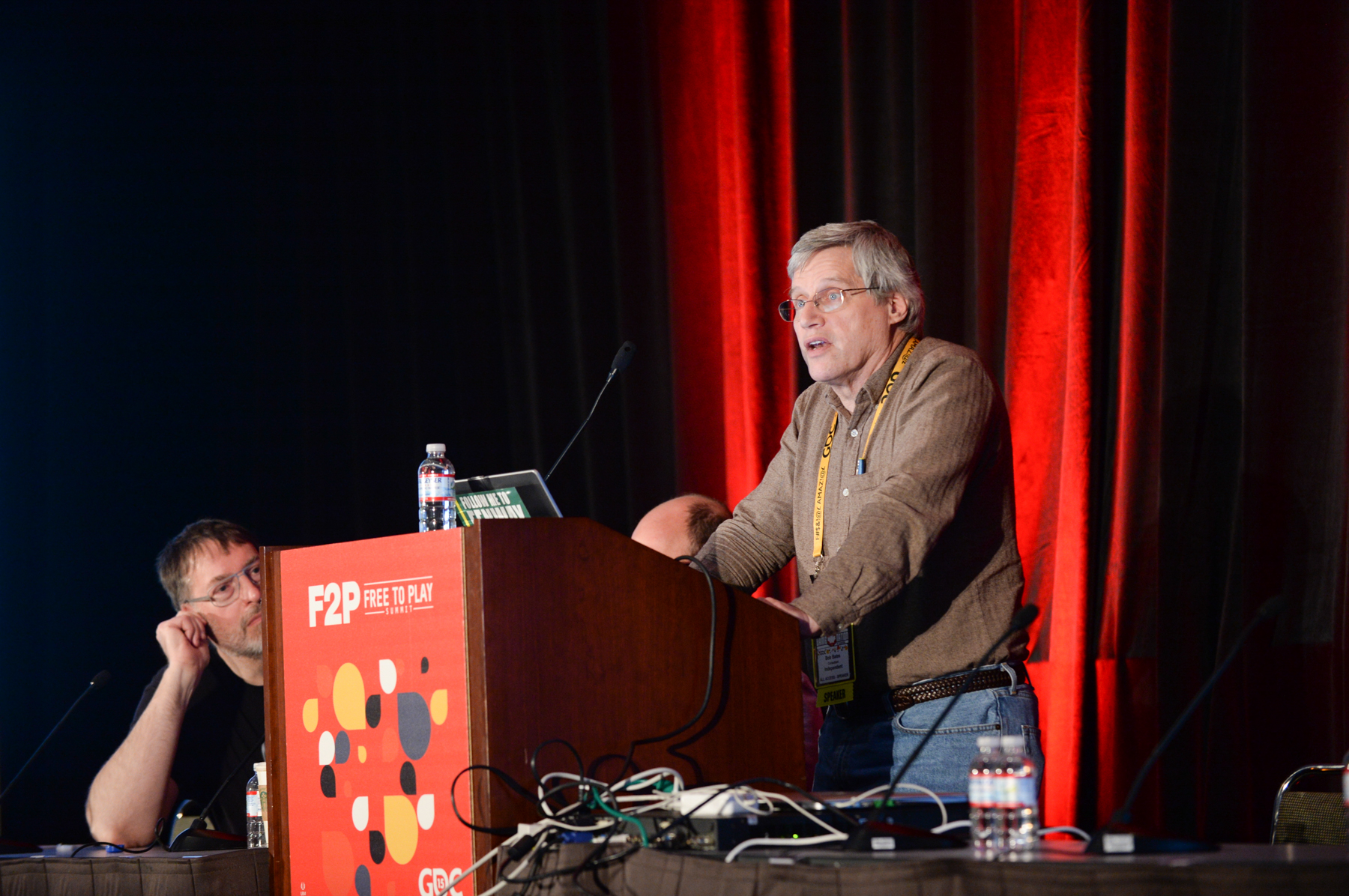
Bates presenting at the 2015 Game Developers Conference

In the course of his career since 1986, Bates has written, designed, produced, or overseen more than 45 games, with over six million units sold. According to Bates's website, the games have collectively won over 70 industry awards, including two Adventure Game of the Year awards.

He has twice been Chairperson of the International Game Developers Association in 2005 and 2009, and has served on the advisory board of GDC Europe.

== Awards ==
- Lifetime Achievement Award, IGDA, 2010
- Person of the Year Award, IGDA, 2010
- Adventure Game of the Year, Eric the Unready, October 1993, Computer Gaming World magazine
  - 1996, listed at #103 on list of "150 Best Games of All Time", Computer Gaming World, November 1996

== Writing ==
- Game Design: The Art and Business of Creating Games. Prima Tech. 2001. ISBN 978-0-7615-3165-4.
  - 2nd edition published in 2004
- The Game Developer's Market Guide. Premier Press. 2003. ISBN 978-1-59200-104-0.
- Bates, Bob (June 2, 2011). "The Belly of the Whale: Living a creative life in the games industry". Gamasutra.
- Bates, Bob (June 17, 2005). "Into the woods: A practical guide to the Hero's Journey". Gamasutra. Archived from the original on May 11, 2012.

== Games ==
- Sherlock: The Riddle of the Crown Jewels, Infocom, 1987
- Arthur: The Quest for Excalibur, Infocom, 1989
- Spellcasting 101, (with Steve Meretzky), Legend Entertainment, 1990
- Timequest, Legend Entertainment, designer, 1991
- Spellcasting 201, (with Steve Meretzky), Legend Entertainment, 1991
- Gateway, Legend Entertainment, 1992
- Spellcasting 301, (with Steve Meretzky), Legend Entertainment, 1992
- Eric the Unready, designer, Legend Entertainment, 1993
- Companions of Xanth, (with Michael Lindner), Legend Entertainment, 1993
- Shannara, producer, Legend Entertainment, 1995
- Callahan's Crosstime Saloon, (with Steve Riley et al.), Legend Entertainment, 1997
- Quandaries, ethics training game for the U.S. Department of Justice, Legend Entertainment, 1998
- John Saul's Blackstone Chronicles, (designer of one portion), Mindscape, 1998
- Unreal II: The Awakening, writer, Legend Entertainment, PC version, 2003
- Panzer Elite Action: Fields of Glory, producer/designer, 2006
- Spider-Man 3, designer, Vicarious Visions, PS2/Wii version, 2007
- Cursed Mountain, writer, Deep Silver, 2010
- FrontierVille, Zynga, 2010 (writer of romance plot)
- Empires & Allies, Zynga, 2011
- Thaumistry: In Charm’s Way, 2017
