= Companions of Xanth =

1993 video game

- Cover art by Cathleen Thole
- Developer: Legend Entertainment
- Publisher: Legend Entertainment
- Designer: Michael Lindner
- Programmer: Michael Lindner
- Artist: Michael Lindner
- Writer: Bob Bates
- Composers: Tony Bernetich; Arfing Dog; Eric Heberling
- Series: Xanth
- Platform: MS-DOS
- Release: November 1993
- Genre: Adventure
- Mode: Single-player

Companions of Xanth is an adventure game published in 1993 by Legend Entertainment.

== Gameplay ==
The game is based on Piers Anthony's Xanth novels and loosely follows the plot of his 1993 novel Demons Don't Dream, in which a young man uses a computer game to enter and explore the world of Xanth.

Typical of Piers Anthony's novels, the game is filled with puns and visual gags, and some knowledge of the Xanth universe is helpful; for those players who haven't read any of the Xanth novels, an in-game "Com-Pendium of Xanth" is provided to the player for the majority of the game. The game uses 2D graphics in 8-bit colour and was available on both floppy disk and CD-ROM.

The game was re-released in July 1997 in a bundle with Legend Entertainment's Death Gate and Shannara.

== Reception ==
Computer Gaming World stated in February 1994 that Companions of Xanth was "a very funny game based on an interesting literary license", with "traditional adventure game puzzles". The magazine's Scorpia was less positive in March 1994, criticizing the forced choice of Nada Naga as a Companion, puzzle quality ("uneven at best, and in some cases, downright poor"), and short playing time. She concluded that Companions of Xanth was "the weakest Legend game to date". In August 1994 the magazine said that Xanth "was somewhat weak as a game, but full of Piers Anthony-style humor". The game was reviewed in 1994 in Dragon #204 by Sandy Petersen in the "Eye of the Monitor" column. Petersen gave the game 3 out of 5 stars.

== Reviews ==
- MikroBitti (Jan, 1994)
- Play Time (Feb, 1994)
- Quandary (Jul, 1996)
- Power Play (Jan, 1994)
