= XMP =

XMP may refer to:

== Computing ==
- Cray X-MP, a supercomputer
- Extensible Metadata Platform, an ISO standard for the creation, processing and interchange of metadata for all kinds of resources
- Extreme Memory Profile, information about a computer memory module, used to encode higher-performance memory timings

== Gaming ==
- eXpanded MultiPlayer (U2XMP), the multiplayer expansion to Unreal II
- Unreal Tournament: Expanded Multiplayer (UT:XMP), a total conversion of expanded multiplayer for Unreal Tournament 2004
- Exotic matter pulse burster, a weapon in the game Ingress

== Other uses ==
- Extremely Metal-Poor, stars, galaxies and related
- Xanthosine monophosphate, an intermediate in purine metabolism
- <xmp>, a deprecated HTML element
