= Deathgate =

Deathgate or Death Gate can refer to

- The Death Gate Cycle series of fantasy novels by Margaret Weis and Tracy Hickman.
- Death Gate, a computer adventure game loosely based on the above.
