= Legend Entertainment =

American video game developer

Legend Entertainment Company
- Company type: Subsidiary
- Industry: Video games
- Founded: 1989; 37 years ago
- Founders: Bob Bates; Mike Verdu
- Defunct: January 16, 2004
- Fate: Dissolved
- Headquarters: Chantilly, Virginia, US
- Key people: Bob Bates (president); Mike Verdu (CEO); Steve Meretzky; Michael Lindner
- Parent: American Systems Corporation (1989–1992); Atari, Inc. (1999–2004)
- Website: legendent.com (archived)

Legend Entertainment Company was an American developer and publisher of computer games, best known for creating adventure titles throughout the 1990s. The company was founded by Bob Bates and Mike Verdu, both veterans of the interactive fiction studio Infocom that shut down in 1989. Legend's first two games, Spellcasting 101: Sorcerers Get All the Girls and Timequest, had strong sales that sustained the company. Legend also profited from negotiating licenses to popular book series, allowing it to create notable game adaptations such as Companions of Xanth (based on Demons Don't Dream by Piers Anthony) and Gateway (based on the eponymous novel by Frederik Pohl). Legend also earned a reputation for comedic adventures, with numerous awards for Eric the Unready in 1993. As the technology of the game industry changed, Legend continued to expand its game engine to take advantage of higher graphical fidelity, mouse support, and the increased media storage of the compact disc.

These industry changes led to difficult competition by the mid-1990s, especially in the adventure game genre. Legend secured an investment from book publishing company Random House and developed additional book adaptations, such as Death Gate and Shannara, as well as original titles such as Mission Critical. However, the company's expenses for graphics were rising without a similar increase in sales, causing Random House to exit the game industry. Legend found game publishers to take over marketing and distribution so it could focus its efforts exclusively on development. While the studio's adventure titles suffered in the changing marketplace, working with game publishers allowed Legend to experiment with more action-oriented titles such as Star Control 3. In its final years, Legend fully pivoted to first-person shooters thanks to a growing relationship with Unreal developer Tim Sweeney and an acquisition by publisher GT Interactive. The studio released the 1999 game adaptation of The Wheel of Time book series, designed using the Unreal Engine as a first-person action game. However, Legend's sales continued to dwindle, followed by the difficult development and commercial failure of Unreal II: The Awakening in 2003. The studio was shut down in January 2004, with staff moving to other game companies.

== History ==
=== Origins ===
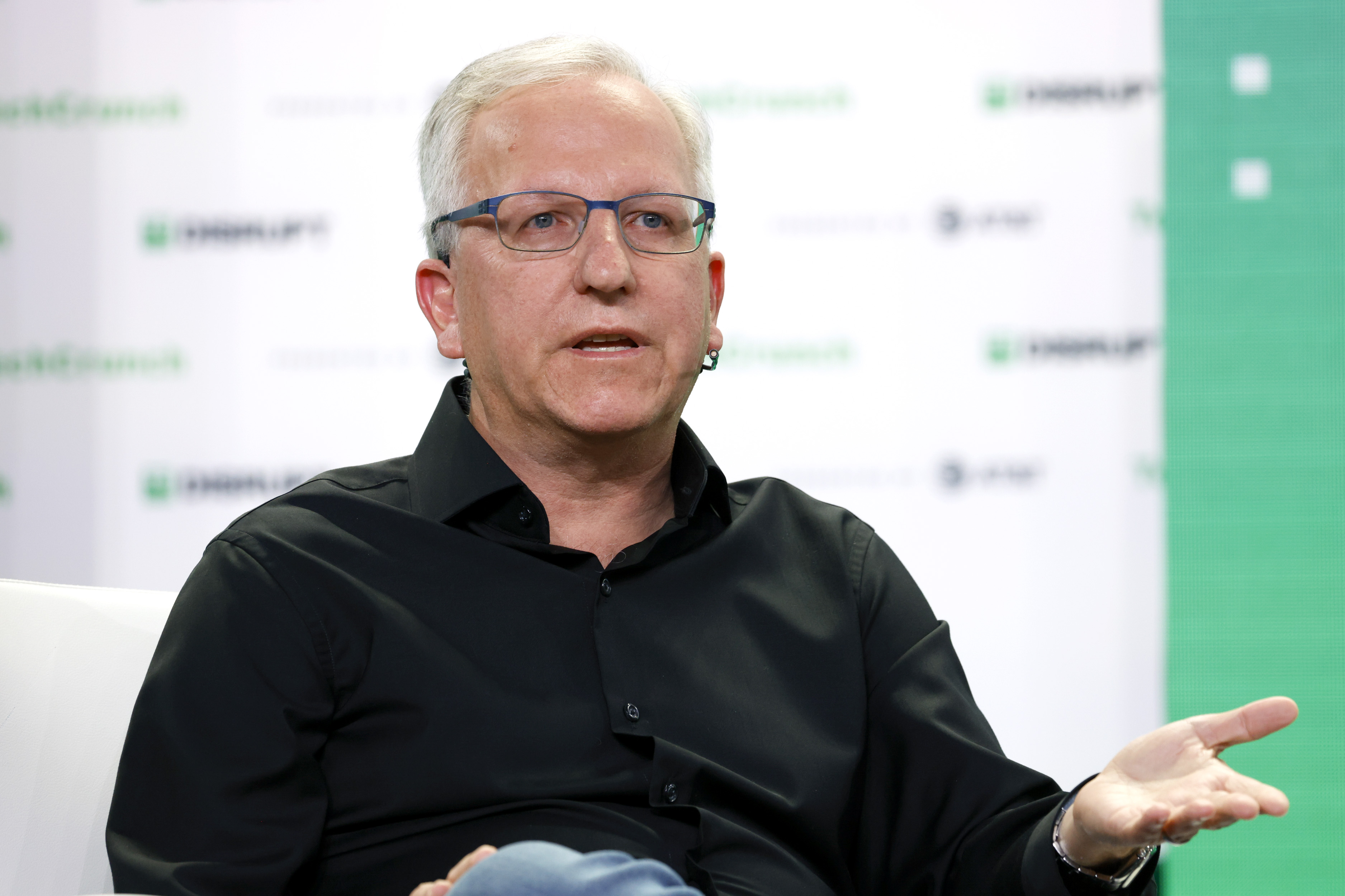
Mike Verdu (2022)

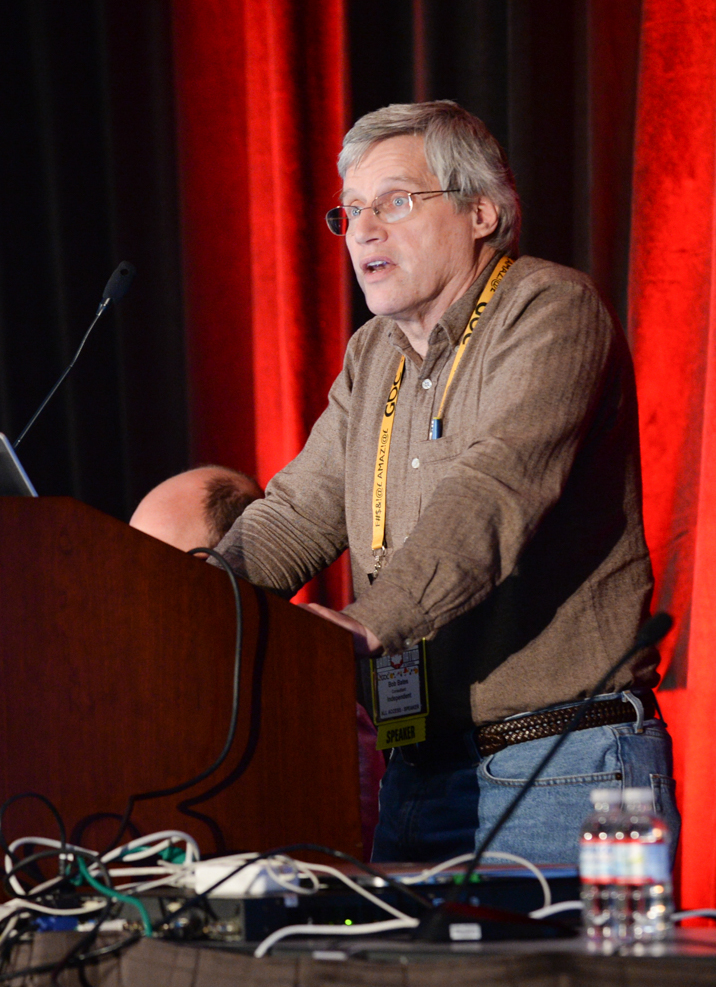
Bob Bates (2015)

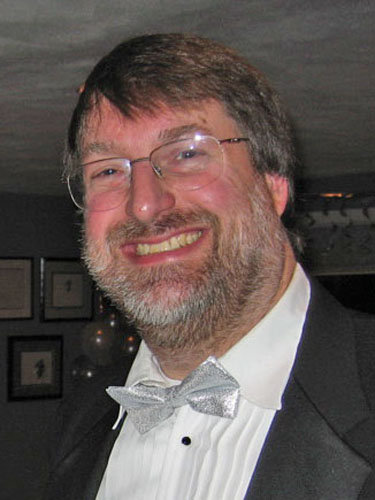
Steve Meretzky (2008)

The business strategy at Legend was clear. ... We were going to make high-quality text adventures for the niche audience that had been abandoned by Infocom. We'd increase the accessibility of the games with great art and a menu-input system in the hope of drawing in a larger audience over time.

— Mike Verdu, Legend co-founder

Legend Entertainment was founded in 1989 by Bob Bates and Mike Verdu. The duo met in the 1980s working at Infocom, a critically acclaimed developer of adventure games and interactive fiction. After the commercial success of the Zork series, Activision acquired Infocom in 1986. They closed the studio three years later due to rising costs, falling profits, and technical issues with MS-DOS. Bates decided to seek investment for a new game company, hoping to succeed where Infocom had declined. He told investors that the adventure genre was still viable, but it needed to evolve beyond just text. After securing funding from defense contractor American Systems Corporation, Legend Entertainment opened by the end of the year, choosing the name "Legend" for its connotations in storytelling. Through its lifetime, the studio operated out of Chantilly, Virginia, the home of American Systems Corporation.

Initially, the studio recruited former colleagues from Infocom for their experience, including programmer Mark Poesch, and Steve Meretzky as an author and developer. Founder Bob Bates worked with Meretzky on the company's first games. Although they had experience developing an adventure game engine at Infocom, Legend hired an outside team to develop their new text parser in order to avoid infringing the copyright of their old Infocom engine. Legend's debut title was Spellcasting 101: Sorcerers Get All the Girls, which expanded on Infocom's text-based adventures by adding graphics for each of the game's rooms. Meretzky described this as a "fusion of the depth and detail of Infocom games with a graphical presentation that would be more in keeping with what audiences circa 1990 demanded", which led to greater sales than their former studio had. Although Legend was worried that the game's raunchy humor might upset their investors in the defense industry, they were relieved that their investors were supportive. At the same time, Bates was developing Timequest with the goal of proving there was still a market for adventure games with intricate puzzles. Legend released Timequest the following year. These first two games earned attention for continuing the legacy of Infocom and signaled a potential rebirth for the adventure game genre.

Legend also benefitted from a strong relationship with traditional book publishers, securing licensing deals for its team's favorite authors while costs were still low. One of the first major licenses was Frederik Pohl's science fiction novel Gateway, adapted into a game of the same name using Legend's now-established adventure game engine. While all of Legend's games featured graphics, it was possible to turn off graphics for their first few games, and play them as if they were classic text adventures. By the end of 1992, Legend were able to buy back American Systems Corporation's stake in the company, and it was selling enough games to easily sustain itself.

=== Point-and-click adventures ===
In 1993, Legend released Gateway II as their last graphic adventure that could still be played in a text-only mode. The studio continued to expand their game engine, adapting to the popularity of the mouse and the increased media storage of the compact disc. The first project to take advantage of CD-ROM technology was Companions of Xanth, which signaled Legend's shift from traditional text adventures to a point-and-click interface. Programmer Michael Lindner had gained valuable design experience from working on Gateway, allowing him to create Companions of Xarth as a solo project. Based on the novel Demons Don't Dream by Piers Anthony, the game was the first of several games built on the same graphic adventure engine. Companions of Xarth was released in 1993, followed by the release of Eric the Unready. The latter game received several awards and nominations, particularly Computer Gaming World's Adventure Game of the Year in 1993 (as a tie with Star Control II). With the release of Companions of Xanth and Eric the Unready, Legend earned a reputation for comedic adventures. However, Legend's business also began to shift with rising production costs for game graphics.

Around this time, Mark Poesch joined full-time as the director of research and development. In 1994, Legend enabled Glen Dahlgren to release his first solo project as Death Gate, an adaptation of Margaret Weis and Tracy Hickman's fantasy book series The Death Gate Cycle. That same year, Legend released Superhero League of Hoboken, where writer Steve Meretzky updated his brand of comedy. The game was nominated for Computer Gaming World's 1994 "Role-Playing Game of the Year" award, praising Meretzky's comedic dialog and imagination. However, the game sold fewer than 25,000 copies and became Meretzky's last title with Legend.

Adventure games were at their peak in the early 1990s, but the studio was facing difficult competition in the genre from Sierra On-Line and LucasArts, who had larger budgets and greater sales. By 1995, Legend attracted a major investment from book publisher Random House, who created a new division called Random Soft to enter the multimedia software industry. At the time, this investment secured Legend from the rising competition due to the booming interest in CD-ROM-based games. Their relationship with Random House also encouraged them to work with more of their authors, leading to the 1995 release of Shannara based on the eponymous novels by Terry Brooks. The same year, Legend released Mission Critical, which became notable for the role of Michael Dorn, of Star Trek: The Next Generation fame. These games were the studio's most graphically complex thus far, but sales were not enough to offset their rising development costs. Random House decided to abandon its ventures into interactive fiction and terminated their partnership with Legend.

Both Legend founders described this period as a "blessing and a curse", gaining higher graphical fidelity and simplified development on a single compact disc, but slowly watching their costs rise until their games were no longer commercially sustainable. In hindsight, Bates lamented the loss of the text interface, which removed the "magic" of having players see that the game recognized and rewarded surprising inputs. Meretzky also felt the shift towards graphics made the games easier and less literary, as well as more expensive.

=== Transformation and dissolution ===
In the late 1990s, Legend began seeking new partners to sustain the company, particularly game publishers. This led to new opportunities for Legend, working with publisher Take-Two Interactive for Callahan's Crosstime Saloon, and working with Accolade for Star Control 3. The creators of the first two Star Control games had moved onto other projects, so Accolade hired Legend to create the third game because of the team's enthusiasm for the series. As Legend was beginning to explore opportunities outside the adventure game genre, Star Control 3 combined aspects of adventure, action, and strategy games. The 1996 release was considered a modest commercial success, surpassing 100,000 sales in its first two months of distribution. Legend continued to report sales of 100,000–150,000 copies for its adventure games, at a time when the future of the adventure genre was in question. However, 1997 brought the commercial failure of Callahan's Crosstime Saloon, an adaptation of Spider Robinson's Callahan book series that was poorly marketed by Take-Two. In 1998, Legend released a game adaptation of John Saul's Blackstone Chronicles, which ultimately became its final adventure game release.

While the company still experienced sales growth each year, the adventure genre was being outsold by other genres. Legend shifted strategies with the rising popularity of the first-person shooter. Game developer Tim Sweeney was developing an engine that would eventually become the Unreal Engine, and Legend designer Glen Dahlgren impressed Sweeney with a vision for The Wheel of Time (based on the book series). This led to a partnership with Epic Games, which led Legend to be acquired by publisher GT Interactive in 1999, as the publisher had worked with both Legend and Epic. Legend released The Wheel of Time in 1999, a first-person action game that represented a major shift from its reputation for adventure games. The game enjoyed more critical than commercial success, overshadowed by other major titles in the first-person shooter genre. Bates lamented that "it was hard to watch as adventure games became less popular. But it was exciting to take our expertise in storytelling and puzzle design into a whole new genre."

After a difficult year for parent company GT Interactive, they were acquired by French game company Infogrames. Legend co-founder Mike Verdu left the company in 2001, deciding he was not happy in the multi-national corporate environment. Although Bates had similar feelings, he continued with the company. Epic Games was impressed with Legend's work on The Wheel of Time's story and their skill with the Unreal Engine, and agreed to let Legend develop the sequel to Unreal. Epic president Mark Rein announced that Unreal II was expected to be released in late 2000. However, the game's development was fraught with challenges, and the 2003 release was met with an underwhelming reception.

Unreal II would be Legend's final game, by which point GT Interactive had been rebranded as Infogrames, Inc., and later Atari, Inc. Legend pitched a few ideas to their parent company, conversing with Atari's offices in New York and Infogrames's in France. However, none of Legend's ideas fit with the company's corporate strategy. After shipping the Unreal II: eXpanded MultiPlayer expansion, Atari shut down Legend Entertainment on January 16, 2004. Many of the former Legend staff went on to have successful careers elsewhere in the industry. Bob Bates became the chief creative officer for Zynga, Glen Dahlgren became one of the lead designers on Star Trek Online, and Mark Poesch became a developer at AOL and Accenture. Mike Verdu became an executive producer at Electronic Arts, before becoming a vice president at Facebook and later Netflix.

== Games ==
List of games developed by Legend Entertainment
Year	Title	Genre	Publisher	Awards and nominations	Ref(s).
1990	Spellcasting 101: Sorcerers Get All the Girls	Interactive fiction	Legend Entertainment	Consumer Electronics Show Software Showcase Award	
1990	Spellcasting 101: Sorcerers Get All the Girls	Interactive fiction	Legend Entertainment	Computer Gaming World – Adventure Game of the Year (Runner-up)	
1991	Timequest	Interactive fiction	Legend Entertainment	Game Players – PC Excellence Award	
1991	Timequest	Interactive fiction	Legend Entertainment	QuestBusters – Best Illustrated Text Adventure	
1991	Timequest	Interactive fiction	Legend Entertainment	Games – Top 100 Games of the Year Award	
1992	Spellcasting 201: The Sorcerer's Appliance	Interactive fiction	Legend Entertainment	Games – Top 100 Games of the Year Award	
1992	Gateway	Interactive fiction	Legend Entertainment	Games – Top 100 Games of the Year Award	
1992	Spellcasting 301: Spring Break	Interactive fiction	Legend Entertainment		
1993	Eric the Unready	Interactive fiction	Legend Entertainment	Computer Gaming World – Adventure Game of the Year	
1993	Eric the Unready	Interactive fiction	Legend Entertainment	Compute! Choice Award – Fantasy Adventure Game of the Year Finalist	
1993	Eric the Unready	Interactive fiction	Legend Entertainment	Computer Game Review – Golden Triad Award	
1993	Eric the Unready	Interactive fiction	Legend Entertainment	Games – Top 100 Games of the Year Award	
1993	Eric the Unready	Interactive fiction	Legend Entertainment	Strategy Plus – Adventure Game of the Year Finalist	
1993	Eric the Unready	Interactive fiction	Legend Entertainment	Game Bytes – Adventure Game of the Year Finalist	
1993	Eric the Unready	Interactive fiction	Legend Entertainment	Computer Gaming World – 9th Funniest Computer Game of All Time	
1993	Eric the Unready	Interactive fiction	Legend Entertainment	Computer Gaming World – 11th Most Memorable Game Hero of All Time	
1993	Eric the Unready	Interactive fiction	Legend Entertainment	Computer Gaming World – 7th Most Rewarding Ending of All Time	
1993	Gateway II: Homeworld	Interactive fiction	Legend Entertainment		
1993	Companions of Xanth	Graphic adventure	Legend Entertainment		
1994	Death Gate	Graphic adventure	Legend Entertainment	Strategy Plus – Animated Adventure Game of the Year Award Finalist	
1994	Death Gate	Graphic adventure	Legend Entertainment	Computer Game Review – Golden Triad Award	
1994	Death Gate	Graphic adventure	Legend Entertainment	Interactive Gaming – Editor's Choice Award	
1994	Death Gate	Graphic adventure	Legend Entertainment	Computer Gaming World Premier Awards – Best Adventure Game Finalist	
1994	Death Gate	Graphic adventure	Legend Entertainment	Games – Top 100 Electronic Games of the Year Award	
1994	Superhero League of Hoboken	Graphic adventure	Legend Entertainment	Strategy Plus – Multi-character RPG of the Year Award Finalist	
1994	Superhero League of Hoboken	Graphic adventure	Legend Entertainment	Computer Game Review – Golden Triad Award	
1994	Superhero League of Hoboken	Graphic adventure	Legend Entertainment	Games – Top 100 Games of the Year Award	
1994	Superhero League of Hoboken	Graphic adventure	Legend Entertainment	Computer Gaming World – Role-Playing Game of the Year Finalist	
1995	Shannara	Graphic adventure	Legend Entertainment		
1995	Mission Critical	Graphic adventure	Legend Entertainment	Computer Game Review – Golden Triad Award	
1995	Mission Critical	Graphic adventure	Legend Entertainment	Byte – Game of the Year Award	
1995	Mission Critical	Graphic adventure	Legend Entertainment	Strategy Plus – Adventure Game of the Year Finalist	
1995	Mission Critical	Graphic adventure	Legend Entertainment	Computer Game Review – Adventure Game of the Year	
1995	Mission Critical	Graphic adventure	Legend Entertainment	Computer Game Review – Best Graphics of the Year Award	
1995	Mission Critical	Graphic adventure	Legend Entertainment	Computer Game Review – Best Introduction of the Year Award	
1995	Mission Critical	Graphic adventure	Legend Entertainment	Computer Gaming World – Computer Gaming Choice Award	
1996	Star Control 3	Action-adventure	Accolade	Game Developers Conference – Best Story, Script or Writing Finalist	
1997	Callahan's Crosstime Saloon	Graphic adventure	Take-Two Interactive		
1998	John Saul's Blackstone Chronicles	Graphic adventure	Mindscape	Computer Gaming World – Best Adventure Game Finalist	
1999	Unreal Mission Pack I: Return to Na Pali	First-person shooter	GT Interactive		
1999	The Wheel of Time	First-person shooter	GT Interactive	GameSpy – 10th Most Underrated Game of All Time	
2003	Unreal II: The Awakening	First-person shooter	Infogrames		
2003	Unreal II: eXpanded MultiPlayer	First-person shooter	Atari		
2003	Terminator 3: Rise of the Machines	First-person shooter	Atari		(Note: Co-development support for Black Ops Entertainment, worked on weapon models and effects)
