= Gateway (video game) =

1992 video game

- Developer: Legend Entertainment
- Publisher: Legend Entertainment
- Designers: Glen Dahlgren; Mike Verdu
- Series: Heechee
- Platforms: MS-DOS, Windows
- Release: June 1992: MS-DOS; 1995: Windows
- Genres: Interactive fiction, adventure
- Mode: Single-player

Frederik Pohl's Gateway is an interactive fiction video game written by written by Glen Dahlgren and Mike Verdu and released by Legend Entertainment in 1992. It is based on Frederik Pohl's Heechee universe. A sequel, Gateway II: Homeworld, was published in 1993.

In 1996 Legend Entertainment made the game available for free download from its website.

== Gameplay ==
Screenshot of Barracks and Main interface in Gateway I

== Synopsis ==
=== Setting ===
A century in the future, humans land on Venus and colonize it. Below the surface, thousands of miles of artificial tunnels are discovered. They are believed to have been built thousands of years ago by an alien species known as the Heechee, but little else is known about them until an explorer discovers a Heechee ship, intact and operational, in one of the tunnels.

Rather than report his findings, he climbs in and activates it. The ship launches and goes into "TAU Space," a faster-than-light travel method. It arrives at a huge space station carved out of an asteroid floating halfway between Venus and Mercury, which is full of thousands of similar ships, but otherwise empty. However, the explorer is unable to figure out how to return to Venus, and faced with a lack of supplies, figures out how to detonate the fuel cell of the ship he came in. The detonation kills him, but also attracts the attention of a NASA tracking station, who send an expedition to investigate.

The discovery of the station and its ships allow humanity to travel into deep space. Although they were unable to reverse engineer the Heechee technology, they can use the ships' stored destinations and the station becomes humanity's "Gateway" to outer space, hence the name. This almost leads to war among the superpowers of Earth over ownership, until a compromise is finally worked out. A co-operative called the Gateway Corporation is formed, with the superpowers each holding one quarter of company stock.

The alien ships that are found still function, but their built-in destinations are a mystery. Navigation is accomplished by using 5 digit codes with the ships' computers, but there is no way to tell what codes go where. Volunteers called prospectors come to Gateway to test the codes and pilot the ships to their destination, explore and report back what they find (as well as bring anything interesting back). A large majority of the prospectors return with little or nothing, a tenth never return, but the remaining 1.5% return with artifacts or knowledge that make them incredibly rich.

=== Plot ===
The player character has won a one-way ticket to Gateway, membership as a prospector in the Gateway Corporation and 10 days of provided life support along with a small amount of money. The player begins as a Prospector and follows procedures in order to know Gateway better and afterwards begin exploring Heechee coordinates. The findings are important enough to get him secure 'Green Badge' status; prospectors of that status are sent to explore only known destinations, with considerably higher probabilities of Heechee finds.

Exploration in one such planet brings a Heechee 'computer' which makes him rich; however, after being analyzed by the Gateway Corporation, it reveals that a hostile alien race, dubbed the Assassins threatens all advanced civilizations in the universe, and the Heechee managed to evade them. Leonard Worden, the deputy chief of the exploration program, informs the player that even after all those years, reactivation of the Heechee technology by humans would only make them detectable to the Assassins. However the same computer provides coordinates to an interplanetary shield device.

The game plot then sends the player to four planets in order to activate a shield device that would 'cloak' the technology signal from the Assassins.

The game's climax occurs on a world of the Assassins, dubbed "Watchtower" where the player is sent to activate the mechanism. There he will meet a Heechee artificial intelligence entity and also an electronic Assassin entity which will trap the player in a VR environment. Following the Heechee AI's guidance, the player is tasked to escape them by creating paradoxes and afterwards upload the Heechee AI.

The game ends with the player's return as a hero and the fear that the threat of the Assassins still exists.

== Relationship to the novels ==
The games are based on Frederik Pohl's novels, but deviate significantly. Gateway shares its premise with Pohl's first book, of a poor space prospector who arrives on the eponymous space station with the intent to use the dangerously poorly understood alien crafts that are based there to explore distant worlds and strike it rich. The similarities soon end as the game introduces original elements, changes (in the novel's terms: travel times are negligible, Gateway has Earth-normal gravity, all ships are ones and bastard control panels are the norm) and material from the later books.

== Reception ==
Computer Gaming World's Charles Ardai stated that "Pohl's influence is felt throughout" Gateway except in the puzzles, which were "pretty good" but based on "the last decade of adventure game design ... most would not be out of place in a golden oldie like Starcross or Planetfall", especially the "jarring and inappropriate" logic puzzles. He approved of the game's graphics and sound but stated that he mostly ignored them because "Gateway is essentially a text adventure with amenities". Ardai disapproved of the game's small number of locations, which the large number of puzzles and repetitive "stall tactics" obscured, and the possibility that a player might never die (which "seems to directly contradict the premise of the game"). He concluded that Gateway was "good enough" but "nothing about the game makes it compelling", predicting that it "will most likely join Rendezvous with Rama, Fahrenheit 451 and their like in a dusty corner of adventure game history". Writing for Computer Games Strategy Plus, Greg Ellsworth found the game easier than Timequest and Spellcasting 101, but enjoyed its graphics, music and story. He concluded that for those "looking for weeks of game play and puzzle solving it may seem a disappointment, but for an entertaining story it hits the spot."

Jim Trunzo reviewed Frederik Pohl's Gateway in White Wolf #33 (Sept./Oct., 1992), rating it a 4.5 out of 5 and stated that "Frederik Pohl's Gateway will provide gamers with a refreshingly different challenge and expose them to what is truly top-of-the-line graphics. A fringe benefit might be introducing new readers to Pohl's excellent science fiction."
