= Gateway II: Homeworld =

1993 video game

- Developer: Legend Entertainment
- Publisher: Legend Entertainment
- Designers: Glen Dahlgren, Mike Verdu
- Series: Heechee
- Platforms: DOS, Windows
- Release: December 1993
- Genres: Interactive fiction, Adventure
- Mode: Single-player

Gateway II: Homeworld is a 1993 interactive fiction video game developed and published by Legend Entertainment. The sequel to Gateway (1992), it is set in Frederik Pohl's Heechee universe.

== Plot ==
A strange, incredibly large object, dubbed "The Artifact" has been located outside the orbit of Pluto. The Artifact is assumed to be a ship, possibly of Heechee origin. The Gateway Corporation plans to send a shuttle to investigate, but a terrorist sect attempts to hijack the shuttle. Their plans are to use The Artifact to alert the Assassins, a highly destructive alien race, of Earth's presence in order to purify humanity.

The player character launches the shuttle before the terrorists arrive, and takes over the Artifact rendezvous mission to discover that it is indeed a Heechee ship; specifically a sample collector. As the narration progresses, the player realized that unfortunate Gateway prospectors had already discovered the ship until they died by an 'insane' Heechee artificial intelligence which took over the system and stored their personalities digitally.

In the third part the sect overcomes the ship and use it to travel to a place dubbed 'Kugelblitz' and bring the Assassins to Earth, hoping to bring a Utopia; meanwhile we are told that the main character had secretly escaped in a Heechee pod. He ends up on a planet with Heechee installations, occupied by native crystalline sentient eels dubbed as 'Kords'. The objective here is to activate the ancient Heechee center and escape with the Heeche ship, which eventually brings the player to the new Heechee homeworld hidden inside a black hole.

In the fourth and final part, the player delves into Heechee intrigue and familiarizes with the sect of the White Hand. These help the human intending to overthrow the modern Heechee regiment and bring the Heechee back to the galaxy from their current hiding place. The player is tasked in several missions to infiltrate and steal several items that enable his ship to return to Earth in time.

The ending sequence brings the player back in the Artifact attempting to sabotage the terrorists' plans to reach Kugelblitz. The epilogue shows that the White Hand has reformed the Heechee civilization and proceeded in an alliance with humanity and an agreement to destroy the Assassins.

== Reception ==
Reception

Review score
| Publication | Score |
|---|---|
| Electronic Entertainment | 8 out of 10 |

Computer Gaming World's Paul C. Schuytema stated that although not directly based on Pohl's works, Gateway II: Homeworld "is a rich and fascinating story which maintains the proper feel of Pohl's original fiction ... I liken the experience to participating in a good, and very interesting, science fiction novel". He approved of the prose and parser as "feel[ing] like an extension of the old Infocom text-only adventures", and concluded that "this game will provide many nights of wondrous entertainment". Gateway II: Homeworld was reviewed in 1994 in Dragon #205 by Sandy Petersen in the "Eye of the Monitor" column. Petersen gave the game 2 out of 5 stars.

James Trunzo reviewed Gateway II in White Wolf #39 (1994), giving it a final evaluation of "Very Good" and stated that "In the final analysis, Homeworld relies greatly on the strength of its challenging but fair puzzles. Homeworld is an excellent choice for those who enjoy thinking and not just using hand-eye coordination."
