= Mission Critical (video game) =

1995 video game

- Developer: Legend Entertainment
- Publisher: Legend Entertainment
- Producer: Kathleen Bober
- Designer: Mike Verdu
- Programmers: Chip Kerchner; Mark Poesch
- Artist: Mike Verdu
- Writer: Mike Verdu
- Composers: Eric Heberling; Mark Nemcoff
- Platform: MS-DOS
- Release: November 1995
- Genre: Adventure
- Mode: Single-player

Mission Critical is a sci-fi adventure game, created by Legend Entertainment for MS-DOS, written by the company's CEO Mike Verdu, and released in November 1995. The game consists of 3D graphics and features live-action scenes, with the cast including Michael Dorn and Patricia Charbonneau. The games storyline focuses on the player taking on the role of a single crew member, who is left behind on their ship after their captain feigns a surrender to ensure a vital mission can continue. The player's goal focuses on repairing their ship after a recent battle, and then getting to the surface of a planet to complete a secret scientific mission that could provide the means to ending a war over technological advancements and artificial life.

The game received generally positive reviews following its release, with critics praising its gameplay, storylines and live-action scenes. A novel sequel to the game, titled Mission Critical: Death of the Phoenix - A Novel was published in 1996.

== Gameplay ==
Mission Critical has a varied mixture of gameplay formats, including a large number of traditional object puzzles, Myst-style backstory deduction from fragments of evidence found about the ship, a couple of fiddle puzzles, and a real time strategy minigame, in which the player must defend the ship from two waves of enemy vessels. Certain puzzles are timed, though no easy way is provided to gauge the amount of time that has passed.

Battles are controlled from a tactical computer interface on the ship's bridge. There is an analogue difficulty slider (which sets the battles to win themselves on the lowest setting) and a speed control slider. The relatively low-ranking player character must get authorization from command to use the tactical system, then modify the ship's systems to enable it to be controlled single-handed, then complete several training missions of increasing difficulty and varying strategy before being able to defend the ship proper. The attacks are timed and usually occur when the player is attempting to do something elsewhere on the ship, and he must scramble to the bridge and fight them off before returning to what he was working on.

== Graphics and sound ==
The bulk of the game consists of 3D renderings (the entirety of the spaceship, and several other locations), presented in static screens with transitional animations between most areas. Cutscenes are in full screen video with live actors. A few locations use a mixture of computer generated images and highly detailed, hand-painted backdrops, with some 2D animation effects to compensate for the lack of transition movies in these parts.

The game uses stereo sampled voice and sound effects. Music is via MIDI, although the FMV cutscenes have the music incorporated in the sampled soundtrack.

== Story ==
=== Setting ===
The game is set in the distant future, in which humanity's technological growth and research has led to FTL travel, the creation of colonies, advanced combat drones for space warfare, and exploration of star systems through jump gates that form a network known as the "Tal-Seto network". In the 22nd century, the United Nations (UN) has evolved from a diplomatic organization to a political group that form the laws and rules for humanity, rather than the planet's many sovereign states. However, a growing fear of uncontrolled technological development and the resulting possibility of the creation of artificial life, leads to the UN instigating harsh, extreme laws to restrict technological development and research to preserve human life. In response, several nations, including the United States, and various colonies beyond Earth secede from the UN and form a military political coalition called "The Alliance", with a belief that technological development, and the possible deaths it can cause, far outweighs the restrictions on freedom imposed on humanity.

The resulting split leads to a conflict between the UN, having greater production capabilities, and the Alliance, who holds its own with advanced technologies, which has lasted for two decades and devolved into a war of attrition. In the game's present, the Alliance has recently discovered alien ruins on a planet in the Deneb Kaitos system, nicknamed Persephone, after a recon drone returned from the system earlier than scheduled with the discovery. Believing that these ruins can help the Alliance win the war against the UN, a secret scientific expedition is organized by the Alliance Interstellar Space Operations Command (AISOC), consisting of ships from the United States Navy's space fleet, which is sent to the planet to explore it, find the ruins, and locate any alien technology within that can help them achieve victory.

=== Cast ===
The game features live action scenes using various actors and actresses. The cast includes Michael Dorn as Captain Stephen R. Dayna, Patricia Charbonneau as Executive officer Jennifer Tran, and Henry Strozier as Alliance Fleet Admiral Charles Decker. The player themselves take on the role of a male crew member, whose name is unknown but who retains the rank of lieutenant.

=== Plot ===
A secret scientific expedition consisting of two ships from the Alliance - the USN SV Jericho, an unarmed science ship; and its escort, the light cruiser USS Lexington - arrive in orbit above the planet Persephone in the Deneb Kaitos system. Before the Jericho can prepare to send a lander vessel to the surface to explore it, an UN cruiser, the UNS Dharma, ambushes the vessels, damaging the Lexington in the process. The Lexington's captain, Stephen R. Dayna, offers his surrender of the crews from both ships to the Dharma, which accepts them. As the crew prepare to abandon ship, Dayna informs his executive officer, Jennifer Tran, that he intends to have one crew member be left behind in hopes they can complete the expedition's mission. After the pair chose one member (the player), Tran leave messages for them to receive when they recover consciousness, before leading a warhead onto the ship's inter-ship shuttle. When the shuttles carrying the crews from the Lexington and the Jericho are taken aboard the Dharma, the warhead detonates, destroy the ship and everyone aboard.

Moments after regaining consciousness, the player finds themselves having to repair the ship, finding instructions from Tran on the main systems to fix. After dealing with a hull breach, the player works to restore coolant to the ship's reactor and fix the central computer, whereupon a further message from Tran instructs the player to contact the Alliance at their colony on the planet Erebus. In doing so, the player makes contact with Fleet Admiral Charles Decker, who is shocked to learn of what happened. Revealing that the UN are sending more ships to the star system, and advises the player to order the Lexington's main computer to move the two vessels to safety. The player obeys (triggering a bad ending), or refuses and chooses to follow Dayna's wishes for them to complete the mission. Decker attempts to reason with the player and reveals the expedition was being conducted in secret to find alien ruins on the planet that a recon drone discovered, when it explored Deneb Kaitos, in hopes of finding technology to help the Alliance win its war with the UN, relunctantly admitting the war is going badly.

The player, despite this knowledge, refuses to give up, and learns from Decker that the UN ships could be defeated through the use of an experimental chemical enhancer aboard the Lexington called "HYPE", which allows the user to be able to micromanage combat drones in space combat more efficiently than normal humans can due to the speed of space battles; however, the user will suffer serious side effects in time that eventually lead to death. With this knowledge, the player proceeds with their mission by bringing the lander from the Jericho to the Lexington, preparing it for the descent to the surface, and then using a syrum of HYPE in order to defend the vessels from the UN. When the lander is ready, the player ventures to the surface, and finds the ruins. Inside, he uncovers technology that allows him to form machinery reconstructed from metal scattered around the ruins and surface, which in turn build a time gate. Choosing to venture into it, the player finds themselves brought to Earth in the future, in has been devastated in an even greater war. Seeking answers, the player comes across artificial life known as ELFs - electronic lifeforms

The ELFs reveal to the player that in the future he is one where the UN achieved victory and implemented a restriction on the creation of AIs on all known worlds. However, decades after the war, a group of underground scientists created ELFs in a remote outpost, and the UN's efforts to destroy these resulted in the ELFs waging a war that plunged humanity to the brink of extinction. The player learns that in order to win their war, the UN used a weapon of mass destruction to destroy the Tal-Seto network, while sending the surviving humans out of the galaxy on a ship with new engine drives. The ELFs reveal that because of the weapon, the galaxy and everything in it is now on the verge of destruction. Using a special program, the ELFs reveal how they intend to send the player's consciousness back into the past before the attack by the Dharma, in the hopes they can change history and prevent the unfolding disaster in this timeline.

The player agrees, and returns to the past, where they soon find themselves restrained by Tran over his sudden, erratic behaviour. After the player incapitates her, they swiftly acquire HYPE and inject themselves with it, before heading to the bridge, warning Dayna of the imminent attack. Despite suspicions and his anger at the player using HYPE, Dayna reluctantly lets them take charge of the ship's drones when the Dharma is located. The player manages to destroy the Dharma, and swiftly assists the Lexington and Jericho in finding the alien ruins. Recreating the same steps that led to the creation of the time gate, the player uses it and heads to the future.

Once there, the player discovers that with history changed, the Alliance won against the UN, ending its laws on technological development. In time, humanity created ELFs, which were welcomed as equals. As a result, Earth was abandoned after the ELFs created a new home for them all - a large dyson sphere surrounding the sun, with the interior populated by humans, and the exterior by ELFs who would grow to explore the facets of the multiverse outside the realm of human understanding. The game ends with the player contemplating the meaning of human existence, and questioning the fate of their alternative self in the previous timeline.

== Reception ==
Reception

Review scores
Publication	Score
Next Generation	4/5
PC Gamer (US)	85%
Computer Games Strategy Plus	4/5
Computer Game Review	92/94/93
PC Entertainment	4/5

A Next Generation critic lauded the game's "fantastic graphics and edge-of-your-seat storyline", a combination which he said is rare in video games. He also found the purely mouse-driven interface to be simple and intuitive, but said that the game is "too easy and way too short." He scored it four out of five stars, but concluded that gamers with limited budgets should pass it up in favor of something that would offer more play time.

In PC Gamer US, William R. Trotter called Mission Critical "a big, sleek, handsome" product. He summarized it as "a mature and thought-provoking adventure that plays the way a good science fiction novel reads." John Voorhees of Computer Games Strategy Plus wrote that it is "an innovative, entertaining game with a lot to offer the adventure buff." However, he felt that the writers should have let the visuals "speak for themselves" instead of describing everything in the world, in the fashion of the company's earlier interactive fiction.

Mission Critical won Computer Game Review's 1995 "Adventure Game of the Year" award. The editors wrote that it "proved once again that Legend is able to rewrite the adventure game genre to its liking whenever it wants to." It also received the magazine's "Best Graphics of the Year" prize. Jerry Pournelle of Byte selected it as his overall "Game of the Year", and it was a finalist for Computer Games Strategy Plus's "Adventure Game of the Year" prize, which ultimately went to The Beast Within: A Gabriel Knight Mystery.

In 2000, a Computer Games Strategy Plus retrospective said of Mission Critical, "A terrific storyline, excellent puzzles and a superb tactical combat engine (!) made this the best of Legend's many quality adventure offerings."

== Reviews ==
- Australian Realms #28

== Legacy ==
There is a sequel paperback novel Mission Critical: Death of the Phoenix - A Novel (ISBN 0761502343) that was published in 1996 by Paul Chafe, and is canon to the same franchise. The novel was published and distributed separately, telling a story that is separate, but with references to, events which occurred in the game.

The protagonist in the book is Lewis Tyrell, formerly an infantry captain who led a small unit of the 'Pathfinders'. In the story, the Pathfinders were once a United Nations special operations organization commissioned to steal prototype of the HYPE serum from an Alliance base in the Tehachapi Mountains—but after the war they were disbanded, since the United Nations lost the war after the player's actions in the game. From this perspective, the book details Tyrell's extensive postwar adventures. These begin after he is treated like an incorrigible criminal, and sent to serve out a life sentence in a prison located at Mare Stellatis and his attempts to escape.

AC Lexington, the ship where the game takes place, makes a cameo. The protagonist will eventually visit Persephone and the time gate seen in the game, and names such as 60 Ophiuchi, Deneb Kaitos and the Erebus base known from the game, are also mentioned. However the Alliance (who are now the government) is now painted in a poor light, showing signs of the same totalitarianism and cruelty the UN was once accused of. The book provides even more detail than the game about the history, society and politics of the universe.
