= Eric the Unready =

1993 video game

- Cover art by Boris Vallejo
- Developer: Legend Entertainment
- Publisher: Legend Entertainment
- Designer: Bob Bates
- Programmers: Duane Beck; Glen R. Dahlgren; Michael Lindner
- Artists: Tanya Isaacson; Paul Mock; Kathleen Bober
- Composer: Glen R. Dahlgren
- Platform: MS-DOS
- Release: 1993
- Genre: Adventure
- Mode: Single-player

Eric the Unready is an adventure game developed and published by Legend Entertainment for MS-DOS in 1993. Eric the Unready is a parody of the fantasy genre in general, though it parodies numerous other topics as well, ranging from Star Trek to Zork. It tells a comedic story of the titular unqualified knight on a quest to rescue a princess. The game also adapts the character Morgan le Fay from Arthurian legend. The game was well received.

== Gameplay ==
The game engine of Eric the Unready uses an interactive fiction style interface. A graphical display of the player's location and viewpoint is provided in a window. Other windows can feature a point-and-click interface, including a listing of the player's inventory and a command list with multiple-choices menus.

== Plot ==
According to a prophecy, King Fudd the Bewildered is expected to die next week, and the unmarried princess at his side shall inherit the Kingdom. His legitimate daughter, Princess Lorealle the Worthy, comes to the castle to be on his side but disappears mysteriously the next day. Early in the game, the player learns of the scheme by Fudd's wife and Lorealle's stepmother, the wicked Queen Morgana the Black, who plots with her lover Sir Pectoral to have her daughter by a previous marriage to be on the dying King's side and therefore become the sole heir. Lorealle has been abducted and held in the castle of Morgana's witch sister with the intent to marry the evil Beast in order to be excluded from the prophecy. In order to make certain that Lorealle will be not rescued in time by any knight, Morgana conspires so that the Union Hall picks the most incompetent and unworthy of them, Eric the Unready – the player character.

Bud the Wizard (a pun on Budweiser) informs the player that in order to access the castle, he must find several magical items: the Pitchfork of Damocles, in the leaves of the tallest tree in the Enchanted Forest; the Crescent Wrench of Armageddon, within the walls of Blicester Castle; the Raw Steak of Eternity, guarded by the Stygian Dragon; the Crowbar of the Apocalypse in the mists around the Mountain of the Gods; and the Bolt Cutters of Doom owned by an enchanter in the Swamp of Perdition. Each mission is somehow timed: the evil Sir Pectoral is after him; if the player takes too long to reach the object, the game will end. With each acquisition, Eric creates some disaster, usually an explosion, which hurls him to the next area the following day. The player can collect a newspaper from each area/day which describes Eric's latest mishaps and other fictional "news" of the game world, usually puns on pop culture. Eric's final destination is the witch's castle, where he uses the magical objects to open its gate. He then prevents the Princess' wedding and destroys the Beast along with a castle full of monsters. After that, the King orders Morgana and her daughter to be exiled along with Sir Pectoral, and Sir Eric and Princess Lorealle are about to marry.

== Reception ==
Eric the Unready received positive reviews, including being rated 4 out of 5 stars from Dragon, and scoring 78% and 75% from German magazines PC Games and PC Players, respectively. Compute! review stated: "Perfectly realized from concept to execution, Eric the Unready is a rare treat that's not to be missed." The game received or was nominated to several awards and accolades, including Computer Game Review Golden Triad Award, Game Bytes Editor's Choice Award, Computer Choice Awards (finalist), and Strategy Plus Adventure Game of the Year (Nominee). Computer Gaming World magazine in 1993 named it Adventure Game of the Year (with Star Control II), in 1994 called it "a comic masterpiece", and featured it in their 1996 list of the "150 Best Games of All Time" in 103rd place, also ranking it as #9 Funniest Computer Game, #11 Most Memorable Game Hero, and #7 Most Rewarding Ending.

Jim Trunzo reviewed Eric the Unready in White Wolf #36 (1993), rating it a 3 out of 5 and stated that "If you're ready to face the dreaded Ninja Attack Turtles, prepared to thwart the diabolical plans of the evil Queen Morgana and her lover Sir Pectoral, and ready to help the farmer get his beloved daughter, who has been turned into a pig, out of the muck in the bottom of the outhouse, you're ready to become Eric the Unready!"

== See also ==
- Æthelred the Unready, a historical English king.
