= Cursed Mountain =

2009 video game

- European box art
- Developers: Sproing Interactive; Deep Silver Vienna
- Publisher: Deep Silver
- Director: Gunter Hager
- Producer: Marin Gazzari
- Designers: Tobe Mayr; Christoph Quas; Georg Heinz
- Artist: Wolfram Neuer
- Writer: Bob Bates
- Composer: Darren Lambourne
- Platforms: Wii; Microsoft Windows
- Release: Wii: NA: 25 August 2009; EU: 4 September 2009; AU: 15 October 2009; Microsoft Windows: EU: 5 February 2010
- Genres: Survival horror; Action-adventure
- Mode: Single-player

Cursed Mountain is a 2009 video game co-developed for the Wii by Sproing Interactive and Deep Silver Vienna, and published by Deep Silver. A Europe-exclusive port for Microsoft Windows was developed and released by Deep Silver in 2010. The story follows mountaineer Eric Simmons's trek up Chomolonzo to rescue his brother Frank, who unleashed hostile ghosts and monsters onto the surrounding lands. The gameplay, combining elements of survival horror and action-adventure, follows Eric as he ascends Chomolonzo, collecting items and fighting hostile ghosts.

Including pre-production, development lasted over two years and was shared between multiple external studios; the team included industry veteran Bob Bates as script writer, and former Rockstar Vienna staff. The team wanted to create a game experience unlike others on the market, focusing on open environments and real-world folklore. Pre-production focused on researching Tibetan Buddhist folklore and survival stories from the Himalayas. While motion control-based mechanics were always present, action-based elements were added based on tester feedback.

Announced in 2008, Cursed Mountain saw little marketing support from Deep Silver leading up to release. The game saw a mixed reception. Praise was given to its narrative and atmosphere, but many criticised its use of motion controls. It was the only game created by Deep Silver Vienna before closing down in February 2010.

== Gameplay ==
Protagonist Eric Simmons fights a boss monster.

Cursed Mountain is a survival horror action-adventure video game where players take on the role of mountaineer Eric Simmons. The game is split into thirteen levels, with the player controlling Eric as he explores a number of environments, solving puzzles and fighting hostile ghosts. All actions are controlled using the Wii Remote and Nunchuk. While basic movement and interactive actions use the d-pad and buttons, several combat and environmental triggers rely on the console's motion controls. If Eric dies, the game ends and the player must reload from an earlier save point.

During level exploration, some doors and pathways must be unlocked by completing puzzles in other areas of a level. Some puzzles require Eric to activate his third eye, which reveals hidden symbols in the environment. During some sections, Eric must climb sheer walls, with his movements mapped to the motion controls. During exploration, Eric can find items such as health-restoring incense sticks, and journal entries which flesh out the game's lore. Items and weapons found by the player are stored in a backpack.

During exploration, Eric is attacked by hostile ghosts, being drawn into a shadow realm during combat. To see clearly and attack ghosts, Eric must activate his third eye, and use a pickaxe augmented with a ritual object to fire projectiles at attacking ghosts. Once weakened, a glowing symbol appears on a ghost. The player must hit the symbol, then complete a quick time event by matching motion gestures with the Remote and Nunchuck to permanently banish the ghosts. In addition to ranged attacks, Eric can also swing the pickaxe to damage ghosts directly. During the game, the pickaxe can be upgraded with new enchantments which change the power and type of ammunition. For the Microsoft Windows port, the motion control mechanics were redesigned; instead, players used the mouse to draw specific patterns on screen.

== Synopsis ==
Set during the late 1980s in the Tibetan Himalayas, the story opens with a log from climber Eric Simmons; his younger brother Frank was hired by wealthy expedition organiser Edward Bennet to retrieve a Terma artefact from the mountain Chomolonzo that is believed to bring eternal life. The local practitioners of Chöd Buddhism believe that Chomolonzo is the embodiment of the goddess Palden Lhamo. Frank has disappeared, going up the mountain alone after an argument with his climbing partner Paul Ward. Eric goes himself to try and rescue Frank. He finds the city of Lhando completely deserted. Attacked by a ghost, he is narrowly rescued by the monk Thod-pa, who teaches Eric to awaken his third eye and fight the ghosts before vanishing. Reaching Bennet, he learns that Frank did something wrong with the ritual preparations for climbing Chomolonzo, but may still be alive and that Thod-pa can help.

During his ascent, Eric learns that Bennet's own attempt to get the Terma failed and cost him his leg, so he hired Frank to get it. He is directed by a survivor in Cherku Village to the yogini Jomo Menmo, who reveals that Frank is still alive and was working with her apprentice Mingma to climb the mountain. Menmo speaks with Palden Lhamo, then turns hostile and accuses Frank of angering Palden Lhamo, demanding Eric's blood as recompense. Back in Cherku, Eric fights a monstrous bird spirit, then a calmed Menmo performs a final ritual that warns of a hard journey and reveals Palden Lhamo is undecided about Frank's fate, giving Eric hope he can save him. Reaching the monastery and Thod-pa, Eric learns that Frank was summoned by Bennet as he fit a translated prophecy about the Terma's retrieval. The llama of Derge Gonchen Monastery reveals that Frank used the Terma to attempt physical entry of the Bardo, a transitional realm between life, reincarnation and nirvana. Frank's spirit is trapped in the Bardo, but can return to his body.

As Eric reaches the base camp, he pieces together what happened. Frank had not completed the necessary twelve ritual walks before the ascent, so went through a series of rituals with Mingma as a shortcut. Mingma and Paul fell in love, invalidating Mingma's sacred status. Frank climbed the mountain rather than repeat the process, an act that cursed the expedition and unleashed ghosts from the Bardo. Upon reaching the base camp, Eric learns that Bennet killed Mingma in a rage after she attempted to flee. Confronting Bennet and Paul with the evidence, Bennet kills Paul, changing into a demonic monster for his sacrilege that Eric destroys. Eric summits Chomolonzo and faces the physical incarnation of his inner demons. Eric then purges the curse with the Terma, pacifying Palden Lhamo and reviving Frank. Frank, having seen his own demons, decides to die and reincarnate. Eric returns down the mountain leaving Frank's body and the Terma on its summit.

== Development ==
Cursed Mountain was primarily co-developed by Sproing Interactive and the Vienna branch of Deep Silver, who also acted as publisher. The team of Deep Silver Vienna included multiple staff members from its precursor studio Rockstar Vienna. The first concept was a game set within the religion and scenery of Asia. Using this as a base, they decided upon the Tibetan Himalayas as the setting, leading into its mountain-climbing elements. From there, the basic combat mechanic of exorcising ghosts using control gestures was settled upon, leading to the team developing the title on Wii. Pre-production planning lasted ten months, followed by 19 months of active production. In addition to the main studios, the team employed 16 external companies across fourteen different countries. To ensure continuity between these developers, the team laid out the game design in a simple document and stuck to it, while communicating frequently with the other studios via web calls. Deep Silver staff member Martin Fillip described Cursed Mountain as the company's first title to rely so much on outsourcing to other studios. There were some issues with communication and delays in creating a vertical slice of gameplay, and a few of the production partners closed down during the game's development.

Narrative and location research took place during the pre-production period. The 1980s setting was chosen to reinforce the isolated atmosphere, depriving players of modern technology that could help in emergencies. It was also a time when there was superstition about Western climbers coming to the region and violating local customs, which in-game was taken to a literal conclusion. While there are fantastic elements, the team wanted to maintain ambivalence as to whether the ghosts were real, or whether the characters were suffering from altitude-based hallucinations. The scenario was written by industry veteran Bob Bates, who was creating the scenario before some of the settings had been finalised. He described working without this reference as the most difficult part of his work. The team's research included multiple documentaries about Buddhism, the Dalai Lama, and specifically the survival story of Touching the Void. The focus on one brother searching for another was inspired directly by Reinhold Messner losing his brother on an expedition. Eric's Scottish origin drew from the high number of Scottish mountaineers during the period. The team also wanted a character voice that had not been heard in many games, which would have been near-impossible with an American protagonist. They also incorporated real-world rituals into the narrative, such the tradition of the kora (circling a sacred site before entering).

The music was composed by Darren Lambourne, who also acted as sound director. His music reflected the harsh environment, religious elements and darker themes. To present these themes, Lambourne deliberately mingled the music with the in-game sound effects. He acquired several musical instruments native to the region and incorporated them both into the score and the environmental sound. He also incorporated Tibetan chanting. To create the right environmental feel, Lambourne blended musical instruments and ghost vocals with the sound effects in several areas, aiming to avoid "Hollywood cliches" and use the environment to evoke tension. The voice recording was done in London, with all the actors being either English or Scottish to fit in with the team's narrative wishes.

The game was designed using "Athena", a proprietary game engine created by Sproing to display complex and higher-quality graphic and environment effects on the Wii. The team aimed to make all elements, from the environment to the ghosts, as realistic as possible to promote player immersion. Each level had to be unique, showing changes in scenery and architecture as Eric climbed higher up the mountain. The team also wanted the entire trek up the mountain to be visible from either end of the path, something difficult to achieve on Wii. A production challenge was the scale of levels; their original designs were larger, but due to hardware limitations were reduced in size. An early wish was to make sure the various gameplay elements (exploration, survival, combat) were balanced with each other so it would not become dominated by any single element. Originally, the shooting mechanics were non-existent, with the motion-based prayer gestures being the only combat mechanic. Due to tester feedback, the team implemented the pickaxe-based combat. The gestures used to banish ghosts were based on the real-world concept of mantras. Using mantras as a base, the team incorporated both familiar and "innovative" gameplay elements. The gesture system was intended to open up a player's body language and make them face their fears while defeating ghosts. The team also incorporated level-specific elements that would use the Wii control features.

== Release ==
Cursed Mountain was announced in July 2008 at the Leipzig Games Convention. The title was shown off at E3 2009. The game was notable due to its platform choice and mature content, as the Wii was better known for family-oriented titles. The beta version was completed by March the following year. While the game was now complete, balance and lighting adjustments continued until release. In the run-up to release, it had relatively little marketing support. It released in North America on 25 August 2009. It went on to release in Europe on 4 September, and in Australia on 15 October. A limited edition was released at launch, including a double-sided disc featuring a documentary on the game and the complete soundtrack. A release for Windows was indicated in mid-2009 by a leaked ESRB rating for the platform. The port was released by Deep Silver on 5 February 2010 as a European retail exclusive. It received a digital release on GamersGate. Cursed Mountain was the only title developed by Deep Silver Vienna before its closure by parent company Koch Media in February 2010 due to what they described as "the current overall economic situation". The studio's second in-development title Ride to Hell was transferred to another studio.

== Reception ==
Reception

Aggregate score
Aggregator	Score
Metacritic	67/100

Review scores
Publication	Score
Eurogamer	5/10
GameSpot	7.5/10
GamesRadar+	3/5 stars
GameTrailers	6.5/10
IGN	7.5/10
Nintendo Life	8/10
Nintendo Power	7/10
Nintendo World Report	8/10
Official Nintendo Magazine	82%
PALGN	8/10

Review aggregate site Metacritic gave Cursed Mountain a normalised score of 67 out of 100, indicating "mixed or average" reception based on 51 reviews. Upon release, the game saw a mixed reaction from journalists, with many praising its atmosphere and faulting its controls.

Eurogamer's Keza MacDonald and GamesRadar's Shaun Curnow praised the setting as the game's best feature. Kevin VanOrd, writing for GameSpot, lauded its authentic use of local folklore and cited the narrative as one of the strong points of the game. IGN's Matt Casamassina cited the narrative as "unique" due to its setting and tone. James Newton of Nintendo Life lauded the narrative and setting. Similarly, Randy Nelson of Nintendo Power called the story "interesting", while Nintendo World Report's Lukasz Balicki enjoyed the Himalayan setting and folklore while noting uneven pacing. PALGN's Jeremy Jastrzab called the setting and narrative "superbly put together". By contrast, GameTrailers found the narrative lacking, citing its weakness as a detrimental factor in completing the game. Fred Dutton of Official Nintendo Magazine praised the setting as innovative compared to other horror titles but likewise found the story confusing without additional texts found through levels.

The general aesthetic was enjoyed by MacDonald, but she faulted the character animations as outdated and overuse of fog effects. VanOrd echoed the criticism of the fog effect during combat, while GameTrailers felt that the level design and aesthetics were a minor advantage compared to other elements such as the cutscene design. Echoing this, Casamassina generally liked the art and environment design, citing a few set pieces that impressed him. Newton praised the voice acting and cited the game as one of the best-looking titles on the platform. By contrast, Nelson faulted the voice acting, while Balicki rated the sound design as one of the game's strong points. Dutton praised the "excellent" sound design, and Jastrzab noted its strong art direction and aesthetics. Curnow noted the attention to detail, but found the dedication to Buddhist aesthetics undermined the game as a whole.

MacDonald enjoyed some of the gameplay ideas, but faulted the lack of innovation or challenge. VanOrd enjoyed the combat when it functioned properly, but cited frustrating repetition in the gameplay structure. Similarly GameTrailers noted the gameplay as enjoyable in places, but found its style broke the game's atmosphere. Casamassina found the gameplay interesting, but faulted the level design as archaic. Newton was disappointed with the traditional button-based combat mechanics following the pre-release emphasis on motion controls. Furthermore, Nelson noted a lack of variety and growing fatigue as the game progressed, while Balicki noted its unique approach to the survival horror genre despite difficult movement controls. Jastrzab faulted the lack of innovation in gameplay and lack of collectables, but otherwise praised the experience. A common complaint from all reviewers was a lack of responsiveness from the motion controls, with a few saying they were unusable at some points.

Reviewing the Windows port, John Coxsey of website Adventure Classic Gaming was generally positive and gave it a score of three out of five stars. In addition to echoing praise of the narrative and atmosphere, he noted the slight graphical upgrade and wider colour palette compared to the Wii original. His main complaints were a lack of content and the game's short length, and he also noted that its deeper spiritual elements would be lost on most players.
