= Unreal II: The Awakening =

2003 video game

- Developer: Legend Entertainment (Note: Ported to Xbox by Tantalus.)
- Publisher: Infogrames (Note: Infogrames, Inc. released the Microsoft Windows version under the Atari brand name. By the time it released the Xbox version, the company had been renamed Atari, Inc.)
- Directors: Mike Verdu; Glen Dahlgren
- Producers: Michael Verdu; Glen Dahlgren; Mark Poesch
- Programmer: Mark Poesch
- Artist: Paul Mock
- Writer: Bob Bates
- Composers: Jack Wall; Clint Bajakian; Jeremy Soule; Crispin Hands
- Series: Unreal
- Engine: Unreal Engine 2
- Platforms: Microsoft Windows, Xbox
- Release: Microsoft Windows: NA: February 4, 2003; EU: February 7, 2003; Xbox: NA: February 10, 2004; EU: April 23, 2004
- Genre: First-person shooter
- Modes: Single-player, multiplayer

Unreal II: The Awakening is a first-person shooter video game developed by Legend Entertainment and published by Infogrames under the Atari brand for Microsoft Windows, the game was later ported to Microsoft's Xbox console by Tantalus. It is the sequel to the 1998 video game Unreal and part of the franchise of the same name. Cliff Bleszinski was an executive producer for the title.

== Plot ==
In this game, players step into the shoes of John Dalton, a former Marine veteran of the Human-Skaarj War who now serves as a Marshal for the Terran Colonial Authority. Initially assigned to patrol remote areas of space, Dalton’s routine mission takes a dramatic turn when he is summoned back into action. An ancient artifact is discovered in a ransacked mining facility on Elara V, which is revealed to be one of seven pieces of a powerful weapon. Dalton is tasked with retrieving the remaining pieces, a mission that pits him against formidable adversaries including the Liandri and Izanagi corporations, the Skaarj, and other hostile forces, all vying for control of the artifacts.

== Gameplay ==
The player moves through the game in first person and can shoot, interact with and speak to characters and objects they encounter throughout. Progress is made through each level by destroying enemies and taking actions to open up the path ahead, by interacting with the environment. When exploring enemy planets or bases, instructions and assistance are provided from a spaceship in orbit. Missions are defined by different planets or areas, with 'interlude' levels in between them where the player can explore said spaceship. During this time, the player can interact with other characters to enhance their equipment for the next mission.

The scenery of the map 'Islands'

Unreal II: eXpanded MultiPlayer was developed by Legend Entertainment for Atari to deliver on the original promise to extend the original single-player game Unreal II with a multiplayer functionality. The first playable version was released and made available for download on December 9, 2003. Almost nearing completion, the development of the game was suddenly halted by the unexpected close-down of Legend Entertainment in January 2004. Unreal Tournament: Expanded Multiplayer (UT XMP) is a port of the same name to Unreal Tournament 2004. In line with other online-enabled games on the Xbox, multiplayer on Xbox Live was available to players until April 15, 2010. Unreal II: The Awakening is now playable online again on the replacement Xbox Live servers called Insignia.

XMP is a team-based game, where the players are split into two teams, red and blue. Both teams have a base with an Artifact Node. Each Artifact Node initially contains two Artifacts. The main objective is to steal the enemy's Artifacts and then register them at the Artifact Node belonging to the player's own team, but a team can also win by capturing and holding all generators, effectively draining the enemy team's energy.

Energy is required for almost everything in the game: weapons, vehicles and even the player's advanced movements. Autonomous mechanical defenses (so-called "Deployables") consume the most energy. Without energy, registering the enemy's Artifacts as their own cannot be done. Each map has a number of Generators which can be hacked by each team to provide energy. There are two separate supplies of Energy a player is concerned with: their team's Energy supply (the tall blue bar to the extreme lower right of the HUD) and their personal Energy reserve (the short yellow bar to the immediate left of the team energy bar). The personal Energy reserve is depleted when performing any of the 'advanced' functions of the game; i.e. hacking an object, deploying a turret or a mine, healing a teammate or activating jump jets. Some things, however, draw directly from the team's energy reserve, such as deployed turrets, or driving or firing from a vehicle. The player's personal reserve is refilled from the team's energy bank; therefore, if every team member 'spends' their energy frivolously, the team will soon find itself without defenses, vehicles, or even a place to register stolen artifacts. For this reason, a player should handle their energy responsibly, at least until their team has enough Generators under its control to support multiple energy-intensive activities.

In XMP, players can choose to spawn as one of three character classes. The classes have several different attributes, such as speed, armor and weapons. All classes have a stamina bar and the ability to sprint; sprinting roughly doubles the player's base speed (determined by their class) and depletes their stamina bar at a constant rate. In vehicles this is represented instead by a turbo bar, activated by the driver with the same key. The player's speed is represented by a tall blue bar to the lower left of the HUD and an abstract value next to it; stamina is represented by the short yellow bar to the immediate right of the speed indicator.

XMP has three vehicles: Raptor, Harbinger and Juggernaut. Like the player classes, each vehicle type has specific advantages and disadvantages over the other ones, like speed, armor and weaponry. Driving a vehicle or firing a vehicle weapon uses energy from the team's reserve. Throughout the battlefields are deployment points at which players can spawn after being killed. Most deploy points can be hacked like generators and hence taken over by the opposing team. Deployables can be deployed by a Tech or a Gunner. The Tech can place automatic weapons and force fields, while The Gunner can place mines.

== Development ==
The game was widely anticipated, following the success of the original game in the series, Unreal. Development was initially undertaken by Mike Verdu of Legend Entertainment; Glen Dahlgren, who worked on the 1999 FPS The Wheel of Time, became more involved in the production as time went on.

== Reception ==
Reception

Aggregate scores
Aggregator	Score
GameRankings	PC: 75% XBOX: 64%
Metacritic	PC: 75/100; XBOX: 64/100

Review scores
Publication	Score
Eurogamer	PC: 7/10; XBOX: 5/10
GameSpot	PC: 7.3/10; XBOX: 6.1/10
GameSpy	PC: 3/5
IGN	PC: 8.2/10; XBOX: 7.8/10

The game sold over 100,000 units in the German market by August 2003. In the United Kingdom, it sold 40,000 units during the first half of 2003, which made it the fourth-best-selling computer game during the period. Kristan Reed of GamesIndustry.biz wrote that Unreal II's performance was "less than inspiring after the hype and expectation", and that "a slow descent into budget territory awaits the game". In a 2019 retrospective, Hardcore Gaming 101 stated that "Unreal II isn't a bad game on its own, it's just a different one".
