= Superhero League of Hoboken =

1994 video game

- Developer: Legend Entertainment
- Publisher: Legend Entertainment
- Designer: Steve Meretzky
- Platform: MS-DOS
- Release: 1994
- Genre: Role-playing
- Mode: Single-player

Superhero League of Hoboken is a role-playing video game developed and published by Legend Entertainment for MS-DOS 1994. The game was designed by Steve Meretzky and combines the superhero, comedy and post-apocalypse genres. It was released on both floppy disk and CD-ROM and uses 256 color 2D graphics.

The game was re-released in 2019 with support for Windows, macOS, and Linux.

== Plot ==
In the future, the world is ravaged by wars, nuclear disasters and pollution. Mutations become common, resulting to individuals and creatures with mutant superpowers who unite in crime and become supervillains. However other individuals decide to unite their powers for the common good and become superheroes.

The game is set in the post-apocalyptic New Jersey-New York-Pennsylvania Tri-state area, where the player controls a team of off-beat and often useless superheroes who battle a number of strange enemies, most notably the evil Dr. Entropy, a human jack-in-the-box with plans to bring chaos in the world.

The missions in the game are typically bizarre and often satirise present-contemporary society.

== Gameplay ==
The player chooses their team from a retinue of off-beat characters. The protagonist is the Crimson Tape, whose power is to make organizational charts. His companions are the Iron Tummy, who can eat any amount of spicy food without suffering intestinal distress, Treader Man who is a fantastic swimmer, the Tropical Oil Man, who defeats villains by giving them high cholesterol, the Oxide Man who can damage mechanical enemies such as robots etc.

Every character has three stats which help him in battle: Brawn stat determines weapon damage, Brains affects the effectiveness of super powers, and Toughness is the character's defense.

Each character can be taught or achieve secondary superpowers by drinking colored liquids bought or found anywhere in the game. Superpowers mostly are used in combat, although the superpowers of some characters are just a part of the plot (e.g. for solving certain puzzles).

== Development ==
Due to designer Steve Meretzky's heavy freelance workload during development of Superhero League of Hoboken, he contracted a friend to help with the game's programming in the last months of 1993.

== Reception ==
Reception

Review scores
| Publication | Score |
|---|---|
| PC Gamer (UK) | 72% |
| PC Gamer (US) | 84% |

According to game designer Meretzky, Superhero League of Hoboken sold only 20,000-25,000 copies, which he considered "pretty disappointing."

Computer Gaming World's August 1994 preview of the game stated that "Legend has gone beyond the boundaries of graphic adventures and interbred their traditional fare with elements of computer role-playing". Two month later in the October issue, Scorpia wrote, "[Superhero League of Hoboken] is lightweight fare, and as such, may disappoint those looking for challenging puzzles. On the other hand, this zany melange makes up what is the first true comedy CRPG ever, and that alone is worth the price of admission."

In the October 1994 edition of PC Gamer US (Issue 5) Trent Ward called the game "an exciting mix of adventure and role-playing, perfect for the gamer who's more concerned with game play than graphics." He stated that it "isn't a game that will change the face of entertainment for years to come, but in the end it really is pretty good fun."

In the October 1994 edition of PC Gamer UK (Issue 11), James Leach summarized Superhero League of Hoboken as "good", but he believed that those who "don't like the surrealism ... will soon get bored."

In the May 1995 edition of Dragon (Issue 217), Lester Smith admitted that "Some people may find a few aspects of the game tasteless." But he thought those elements were minor, and that the game "provides quite a bit of entertainment. Its unique characters, captivating missions, overarching story line, and engaging details of play result in a satisfying sense of role-playing."

=== Awards ===
The game was nominated for Computer Gaming World's 1994 "Role-Playing Game of the Year" award. The editors remarked that Superhero League of Hoboken "broke most of the rules", and that its "goofy dialogue and storyline, and well-balanced gameplay, make for a wild ride through designer Steve Meretzky's left-of-center imagination."
