= John Saul's Blackstone Chronicles =

1998 video game

- Developer: Legend Entertainment
- Publisher: Red Orb Entertainment
- Designer: Bob Bates
- Platform: Microsoft Windows
- Release: NA: November 13, 1998; EU: 1999
- Genre: Adventure
- Mode: Single-player

John Saul's Blackstone Chronicles: An Adventure in Terror is a 1998 computer adventure game developed by Legend Entertainment and published by Red Orb Entertainment, a Mindscape subsidiary.

The game is based on serial novels that were written by John Saul, titled Blackstone Chronicles.

A sequel to the novels, the game takes place several years after the sixth book, and continues the story of Oliver Metcalf, his family, and the town of Blackstone.

== Plot ==
The game starts with Oliver arriving at the Blackstone Asylum, which has been purchased and is being turned into a Museum of Psychiatric History. That doesn't sit well with Malcolm Metcalf, Oliver's father and last superintendent of the Asylum, who died some forty years before. All of the activity involved in transforming the Asylum has awakened its residents. For reasons not yet known to Oliver or the player, his father's spirit has taken his son, Joshua, and hidden him somewhere in the Asylum, apparently to coerce Oliver there.

Exploring the mansion, Oliver encounters several spirits of patients who are bound to the asylum by their possessions, including a teenage girl with hysterical pregnancy, a schizophrenic who believes she's English royalty, and a depressed woman who was treated with steam baths and hydrotherapy. Oliver discovers that his father psychologically tortured to suicide or allowed several of his patients to be killed under the guise of accidents during treatment. This is counterpointed by the sterile and rose-tinted explanations from the museum equipment for the same procedures or implements (lancets are described as an attempt to bring the bodies humours into balance, where the spirit of a patient with Alzheimer's disease declares they were used liberally so patients could not defend themselves). Disheartened by the failure of traditional medicine, Oliver's father gradually turned to more and more extreme methods, including totally dismembering and vivisecting an 8-year-old boy to cure his illness. Eventually his treatments turned to outright torture, as a punishment of undesirable behaviors to eventually remove them.

Over the course of the game, Oliver collects several personal items that influence him, causing him to nearly kill himself in several psychiatric methods (ECT, self-injecting neuro-toxins, locking himself in a steam box). His father Malcolm implies this is caused by the inherent evil contained within the items, although its heavily implied that Oliver developed these traps himself while under Malcolm's control, through a long, complicated sequence of post-hypnotic suggestions.

Oliver's father eventually reveals his plan. While Oliver has been trapped in the asylum and continued to refuse Malcolm's demands that Oliver take vengeance on Malcolm's enemies, Malcolm returned Joshua home, and instructs him to murder his mother with a straight razor, as a punishment of Oliver for his disobedience to his father and to make Joshua a monster with Malcolm's similar outlook. With the help of the spirits trapped in the asylum, Oliver destroys the artifacts of his father throughout the asylum, banishing his father's spirit.

== Development ==
Production of Blackstone Chronicles' audiovisuals was outsourced to Presto Studios, creators of the Journeyman Project series.

== Reception ==
Reception

Aggregate score
Aggregator	Score
GameRankings	70%

Review scores
Publication	Score
Adventure Gamers	4/5
AllGame	4/5
CNET Gamecenter	4/10
Computer Games Strategy Plus	3/5
Computer Gaming World	4.5/5
Game Informer	6/10
GameSpot	5.5/10
IGN	7/10
Next Generation	3/5
PC Gamer (UK)	3%
PC Gamer (US)	79%

The game received above-average reviews according to the review aggregation website GameRankings. In Computer Gaming World, Allen Greenberg summarized, "Blackstone Chronicles is definitely a unique piece of work with a gripping storyline, wonderful graphics, and a most talented cast. It should not be missed." John Altman of Computer Games Strategy Plus considered the game "recommendable, if not rave-worthy." He found the graphics middling, and felt that the game's heavy reliance on written text bogged down the experience. However, he wrote that Blackstone Chronicles has "good atmosphere, well-integrated puzzles, and the occasional truly memorable scene."

Reviewing the game for PC Gamer US, T. Liam McDonald called it "the kind of narrative-driven, atmospheric adventure game we see too little of in these days of soulless Myst clones." While he disliked its visuals and lack of character interaction, he felt that Blackstone Chronicles offered "enough to recommend it to many adventure-starved gamers." Next Generation said, "Even with the horror setting, the game may not have emotional charge to hook most players. And the subject matter is very mature, ruling it out for younger kids. Still, it's a good story with enough spooky flavor to keep adventure fanatics entertained."

The game was a finalist for Computer Gaming World's 1998 "Best Adventure" award, which ultimately went to Grim Fandango and Sanitarium (tie). In 2011, Adventure Gamers named it the 43rd-best adventure game ever released.

== Reviews ==
- The Duelist #36

== See also ==
- Dracula: Resurrection
- Faust
- Sanitarium
