= Shannara (video game) =

1995 video game

- Cover art by Boris Vallejo and Mark Heifner
- Developers: Legend Entertainment; Far Studio
- Publisher: Legend Entertainment
- Producer: Bob Bates
- Designers: Lori Cole; Corey Cole
- Artist: Douglas Herring
- Writer: Lori Cole
- Series: Shannara
- Platforms: MS-DOS, Windows
- Release: December 1995
- Genre: Adventure game
- Mode: Single player

Shannara is a 1995 point-and-click adventure game released for MS-DOS and Microsoft Windows. It is based on the book series of the same name by Terry Brooks.

== Gameplay ==
Like other games of its genre, the gameplay mainly consists of interacting with characters, game environments, and items in the inventory. There is also a battle system used in certain places in which the player character can choose to retreat, give orders to party members, attack, or defend.

== Plot ==
Although the game contains characters from the Shannara novels, it is not an adaptation but an original story set after The Sword of Shannara and before The Elfstones of Shannara. Players take on the role of Jak Ohmsford, son of Shea. In Shady Vale, Jak meets Allanon. He tells Jak of the horrible Warlock Lord's return. Jak sets off into the Land of Shannara.

== Reception ==
Reception

Review scores
Publication	Score
Computer Games Strategy Plus	3/5
Next Generation	2/5
PC Gamer (US)	72%
PC Magazine	2/4
PC Entertainment	3.5/5
Computer Game Review	89/90/88

A reviewer for Next Generation criticized the game, saying it fails both as an entry in the Shannara saga and as an adventure game. He opined that the story lacks the quality and depth of Brooks's novels, instead featuring a linear plot with a generic "villain's revenge" premise, while the gameplay falls short due to its bare bones combat system and its "clunky" overhead view when moving characters long distances.

In Computer Games Strategy Plus, Cindy Yans greatly disliked Shannara's role-playing mechanics, and wrote that "you really want to avoid combat at all costs." However, she praised its puzzles, characters and story, and believed that "most Legend fans" would enjoy the game if they played it as a graphic adventure.

Computer Game Review described it as "a solid story from fantasymeister Brooks", and "an adventure game that will appeal to everyone's tastes and pocketbooks.
