= Arthur: The Quest for Excalibur =

1989 video game

- Developer: Challenge
- Publisher: Infocom
- Designer: Bob Bates
- Artists: Darrell Myers; Tanya Isaacson; Sophie Green
- Engine: Z-machine
- Platforms: Amiga, Apple II, MS-DOS, Mac
- Release: Amiga, Mac: June 6, 1989; Apple II: June 22, 1989; MS-DOS: July 14, 1989
- Genre: Interactive fiction
- Mode: Single-player

Arthur: The Quest for Excalibur is an illustrated interactive fiction video game written by Bob Bates and published by Infocom in 1989. It was released for the Apple II, Amiga, Mac, and IBM PC compatibles. Atypically for an Infocom product, it shows illustrations of locations, characters and objects within the game. It is Infocom's thirty-fourth game and is the second of two Infocom games developed by Challenge using Infocom's development tools.

== Plot ==
An example of gameplay in the Amiga version. The player has inputted the letter "s" for "south", indicating that they intend to move into the southward tavern described in the text.

The player assumes the role of a young Arthur, before the legendary days of Camelot. The "sword in the stone" (which in the legends was not Excalibur, but is often confused with Excalibur by people unfamiliar with the legends) that would signify Arthur's destiny to rule, has been stolen by the evil King Lot. In the quest to regain the sword, the player must prove to Merlin that he has the qualities needed to be a great king: chivalry, experience, and wisdom. Merlin assists Arthur by giving him periodic advice as well as the power to transform into animals, but also tells Arthur that unless Excalibur is recovered within three days, Lot will usurp his destiny as a king of legendary stature.

== Feelies ==
Although Arthur was one of the last interactive fiction games Infocom released before closing, the packaging still included a modest attempt at the extra objects, or feelies, that had been a long-standing tradition for the company. The package for Arthur contained a copy of a Book of Hours, which explains the Canonical hours such as Matins, Lauds and Vespers. The book also contains a poem, lines of which are used as passwords in the game as a form of copy protection.

== Production ==
Arthur: The Quest for Excalibur was the second Infocom game to be developed by another company, Challenge Inc, published by Infocom in their "Immortal Legends" genre. The only other game published in this line was the 1987 release Sherlock: The Riddle of the Crown Jewels, also written by Bates. By the time of Arthur's release, Infocom had stopped rating their games in terms of difficulty. Arthur roughly corresponds to the level of their previous "Standard" games.

== Reception ==
The Amiga version of Arthur was met with critical acclaim. Zzap! praised the game's puzzles, graphics, vocabulary and parser, and noted the "odd touch of humour". Paul Rigby of The Games Machine also commended the parser and text, and stated that the ability to transform into animals aided the inventiveness of the puzzles. Keith Campbell of Computer & Video Games personally ranked the game as among the best from Infocom, and cited the added intrigue lent to the game's puzzles by the transformation feature. Nick Walkland of Amiga Format was impressed by the game's graphics and felt that they made the game "atmospherically supreme". He also noted that some of the game's puzzles were "brain-tickling", yet not "especially devilish". Advanced Computer Entertainment commended the game's detailed graphics and high-quality parser and text. Lucinda Orr of Amiga Computing lauded the help menu as the "best help system in the world", the parser as "very good" and the graphics as "pleasing throughout". Commodore User stated that the game's transformation mechanic led to "nicely constructed" logic puzzles and humor. Andy Mitchell of Amiga Action was pleased by the game's mapping facility and colorful graphics, and cited the transformation feature as "great fun".

Scorpia of Computer Gaming World deemed the Apple II version "Infocom's most poorly produced game ever", criticizing the high number of disk swaps (sometimes to print a single sentence or to redraw the automap) and the "mediocre" Apple II graphics.
