= Sherlock: The Riddle of the Crown Jewels =

1987 video game

- Developer: Challenge, Inc.
- Publisher: Infocom
- Designer: Bob Bates
- Engine: Z-machine
- Platforms: Amiga, Apple II, Commodore 64, MS-DOS, Mac
- Release: Release 21: December 14, 1987; Release 26: January 27, 1988
- Genre: Interactive fiction
- Mode: Single-player

Sherlock: The Riddle of the Crown Jewels is an interactive fiction game designed by Bob Bates and published by Infocom in 1987. It was released for the Apple II, MS-DOS Commodore 64, Amiga, and Mac. Sherlock is based on the legendary fictional detective Sherlock Holmes, created by Sir Arthur Conan Doyle. It is Infocom's thirty-first game and is the first of two Infocom games developed by Challenge, Inc. using Infocom's development tools.

== Plot ==
The year is 1887, and all of England is gearing up for the celebration of Queen Victoria's golden jubilee, marking her 50th year as monarch. London, naturally, is especially frenzied. Reading the paper one morning, Sherlock Holmes seizes upon one seemingly unimportant notice: The Tower of London has been closed for "reasons of security". The great detective is unsurprised when, moments later, he is asked to investigate the theft of the Crown Jewels. The clues left behind, however, positively reek of a carefully laid trap; Sherlock decides that he must step aside and allow Dr. Watson to pursue the thief instead. If the jewels are not replaced within 48 hours, the British government will be forced to admit that their most prized possessions were stolen and suffer worldwide humiliation.

The player fills the role of Watson, travelling around London in Hansom cabs while attempting to recover the Crown Jewels while encountering many characters from Doyle's stories such as Mrs. Hudson, Mycroft Holmes, and Wiggins of the Baker Street Irregulars. A series of riddles and clues lead Watson on a hunt for inscribed jewels hidden at several famous sites across the city, including Westminster Abbey, Madame Tussauds Wax Museum, London Bridge, and Big Ben. Eventually, the villain is revealed as Professor Moriarty, who captures both Watson and Holmes. With quick thinking and the help of some humble medical supplies, however, Watson manages to subdue Moriarty and return the Jewels to the Tower in time.

== Production ==
Sherlock: The Riddle of the Crown Jewels was the first Infocom game to be developed by another company, Challenge Inc, published by Infocom in their "Immortal Legends" genre. The only other game published in this line was Arthur: The Quest for Excalibur, also written by Bates.

== Reception ==
"It's an auspicious first offering" in the Immortal Legends series, PC Magazine in 1988 said of Sherlock, "one that Friends of the Great Detective and adventure gamers alike will enjoy".
