= Death Gate =

1994 video game

- Cover art by Keith Parkinson
- Developer: Legend Entertainment
- Publisher: Legend Entertainment
- Designer: Glen R. Dahlgren
- Programmer: Chip Kerchner
- Artist: Glen R. Dahlgren
- Composer: Eric Heberling
- Series: The Death Gate Cycle
- Platform: MS-DOS
- Release: November 1994
- Genre: Adventure
- Mode: Single-player

Death Gate is an adventure game loosely based on Margaret Weis and Tracy Hickman's fantasy book series The Death Gate Cycle. Legend Entertainment released it for MS-DOS compatible operating systems in 1994. It received several awards. The box cover is the painting that Keith Parkinson created for the third book, Fire Sea.

GOG.com released an emulated version for Microsoft Windows, macOS, and Linux in January 2018. It was removed from sale two months later.

== Plot ==
The player takes the role of Haplo and starts in the Nexus with Lord Xar. Lord Xar tasks Haplo to visit the four worlds, Arianus, Pryan, Abarrach and Chelestra and retrieve the seal pieces of these worlds. Xar plans to undo the Sundering with the Reformation, the act of recreating the Earth again and he needs the seal pieces to do so. To travel to the other worlds, Haplo is given a ship with a magical steering stone. If the symbol of a world is magically engraved on it, the ship can travel to that world through the Death Gate. Xar gives Haplo the symbol of Arianus, the realm of air, and Haplo sets sail.

Arianus

Haplo arrives in the lower realm of Arianus, where he encounters dwarves and a machine called the Kicksey-winsey. Glowing figures attempt to operate the Kicksey-winsey, and the dwarves believe them to be gods. Haplo discovers that these figures are actually elves, and they use human slaves to operate their ship. Haplo relays a message to King Stephen, a human slave and cousin of the king. He manages to break the elves' control over the dwarves, leading to the expulsion of the elves. Haplo lures the elven ship into a human ambush and rescues the slaves.

Continuing his quest, Haplo travels to Skurvash, a smuggler's den, where he attracts the attention of Hugh the Hand and infiltrates the Brotherhood. He finds an artifact of Sartan origin, a manual for the Kicksey-winsey, and the book of Pryan in their tower. Haplo returns to the Kicksey-winsey, repairs it, and uses it to dig a tunnel to a hidden chamber. Inside, he discovers crystal coffins containing deceased Sartan. In this chamber, he finds the seal piece of Arianus.

After obtaining the seal piece, Haplo returns to the Nexus and delivers it to Xar. Xar then sends Haplo to Pryan, the realm of Fire. Haplo transfers Pryan's symbol from the book onto the steering stone and travels through the Death Gate to Pryan.

Pryan

Haplo arrives near a massive citadel but faces difficulty in entering. He encounters giant creatures known as tytans in the forest. Stranded, he sets sail for a nearby city he had spotted. There, he meets elves and joins a group of elven and human children led by the elven prince. They introduce Haplo to Zifnab, a seemingly eccentric wizard, who is revealed to be a Sartan. Zifnab senses Haplo's significance despite his Patryn heritage. He informs Haplo about the Citadel's role in generating power for the realms and the task of the tytans to operate it. The Citadel holds the seal piece of Pryan, but it can only be opened by humans, elves, and dwarves using specific golden items: a staff, a sword, and a hammer.

Haplo must secure these items to open the Citadel. He also needs to divert the tytans' attention from a crystal fragment they worship, which has caused them to forget their duties. Zifnab reveals the concept of the Wave, the universe's balance, and gifts Haplo a stone that will guide him to confront ancient evil. Haplo recovers the golden staff and convinces the human princess and elven prince to aid him. Along the way, they rescue a dwarven girl from the tytans who informs them about the hammer's location.

Haplo orchestrates a plan to obtain the hammer and the crystal fragment, triggering a confrontation with the tytans. With the princess and prince's help, Haplo acquires the crystal fragment, inciting the tytans' fury. The dwarven girl acquires the hammer, leading to the opening of the Citadel as the tytans assume their roles. Zifnab permits Haplo to take the seal piece, despite knowing Lord Xar's intentions to conquer the realms and eliminate the Sartan. Haplo delivers the seal piece to Xar, who sends him to Abarrach, the realm of Earth. Haplo inscribes the symbol of Abarrach from the crystal fragment onto his steering stone as he embarks through the Death Gate.

Abarrach

Haplo arrives in an abandoned city populated by undead Sartan. He locates Balthazar's journal, discovering the palace's location and visiting Kleitus the XIV, a dynast of Abarrach. Kleitus identifies Haplo as a Patryn and poisons him. Thrown into a dungeon alongside Sartan prince Edmund, they use Kleitus's dog to retrieve the antidote and escape their chains. They reach the Sartan refugees, meeting Balthazar, who reveals the extinction of the mensch and the Sartan's decline due to 'The Plague,' linked to necromancy.

Haplo explores a secret tunnel, experiencing a vision of Kleitus I's era. He reads a book condemning necromancy, which states that for each resurrected Sartan, another dies. Necromancy causes the Plague, decimating the Sartan. Haplo discovers that Kleitus I sabotaged the Colossus, which diverts Abarrach's energy, and used some for a deadly scepter. Returning to the palace, Haplo repairs the Colossus, leading to Kleitus XIV's demise by Edmund's hand.

Edmund identifies Haplo as a Patryn but sees him as an ally due to their assistance. Edmund gifts Haplo an amulet featuring symbols representing the five realms. Haplo recovers the Arianus seal piece from the Colossus's secret room and returns to the Nexus. Xar swiftly dispatches Haplo to Chelestra, the realm of Water. Haplo transfers the symbol of Chelestra from the amulet to his steering stone, setting his course.

Chelestra

Haplo arrives near a shielded Sartan city and discovers a cave emitting a faint glow from his stone, yet a paralyzing fear prevents him from entering. He dispels the city's ward, attracting the attention of Sang-Drax, a black-winged dragon with red eyes. Sang-Drax discards the stone in fear and attacks Haplo. On the brink of death, Haplo transfers his soul to his loyal dog, escaping Sang-Drax by entering the city. Samah, the Sartan who led the council that shattered the world, restores Haplo's body and soul. Sang-Drax infiltrates the unshielded city, adopting Haplo's form, stealing the final seal piece, and departing.

Samah reveals Sang-Drax's plan to manipulate Xar into executing the Reformation, leading to the demise of mensch, Sartan, and Patryns, with catastrophic consequences. Samah emphasizes the importance of the Interconnection, aligning the realms to the ancient Sartan plan. Pryan generates power, Abarrach provides materials for the Kicksey-winsey, which produces tools for all worlds, while Chelestra supplies water through the Death Gate. Samah entrusts Haplo with a Sartan ship lacking a steering stone. Haplo secures a substitute, transferring symbols from the amulet. Reclaiming his stone, Haplo returns to the Nexus.

The Nexus & the Labyrinth

Haplo discovers that Xar and the Nexus seal piece are missing. He tracks their path through the Labyrinth and comes upon a besieged Patryn village. Taking refuge in a cave, he encounters Sang-Drax once more. Haplo drinks nullifying water, rendering him immune to magic but also preventing him from using magic himself, including Sang-Drax's aura of terror. Haplo shatters Zifnab's stone, summoning Zifnab and his dragon. A battle ensues between the dragons, resulting in injuries to both.

Following Sang-Drax, Haplo, Zifnab, and the dragon reach the Vortex, where the Sundering originated. Haplo finds Xar and Sang-Drax, urging Xar to initiate the Interconnection. Sang-Drax murders Xar before he can act. Undeterred, Haplo determines how to commence the Interconnection and succeeds. In a final confrontation, Sang-Drax is vanquished, and the realms are harmoniously aligned.

=== Characters ===
- Haplo: Haplo is the main character and controlled by the player. He is a Patryn and is commanded by his Lord Xar to find the four seal pieces of the realms Arianus, Pryan, Abarrach and Chelestra. Unlike the book, Haplo has no dog as a companion until he reaches Abarrach, where he finds the dog of Kleitus. In the book Haplo had a dog as a companion from the beginning. Also Haplo isn't nearly as powerful as in the books, probably due to gameplay reasons. He can be easily killed by some mensch if you make the wrong choices.
- Lord Xar: Xar is the most powerful Patryn, the first Patryn to escape the Labyrinth and Lord of the Nexus. He is intended to take revenge on the Sartan. He wants to five seal pieces of the five realms to bring about the Reformation which is supposed to restore the Earth to its former form and undo the Sundering. He intends to rule all the mensch. Like the character from the books he is dedicated and determined to destroy the Sartan. In the game, he is far more easily convinced not to proceed with the Reformation though.
- Zifnab: Just as in the book, Zifnab appears as a crazy wizard. Zifnab is important, explaining a lot about the workings of the Citadels and giving Haplo the stone to combat true evil. He later returns with his dragon to fight Sang-Drax and save Haplo so that Haplo can bring about the Interconnection. The game makes no connection however between Zifnab and the Labyrinth and the books found in the Nexus. His dragon also seems to be the only one of its kind.
- Sang-Drax: Sang-Drax is portrayed as a winged dragon, rather than a serpent. Unlike the books he is also the only one of his kind and his origins are never really explained. In the books the serpents are the embodiment of Evil, which were given form by the Sundering. In the game Zifnab simply states that at one point something very evil was created and that his dragon was created in response.

== Release ==
The game was released with a short story called "Forever Falling" written by Weis and Hickman with Kevin Stein. It tells the story of how Ciang became the Head of the Brotherhood of the Hand, an assassins' guild featured in both the books and the game. The story serves as backstory to events in The Death Gate Cycle and has little relation to Death Gate.

== Reception ==
Reception

Review scores
Publication	Score
Computer Gaming World	3.5/5
PC Gamer (US)	83%

In PC Gamer US, Trent C. Ward wrote, "Players who're used to the visual charms of a King's Quest or a Noctropolis may find this a tough game to get interested in. But if your only concern is for substance, then Death Gate's a winner." He declared it the best Legend "text-and-pictures" adventure released up to that point.

James V. Trunzo reviewed Death Gate in White Wolf Inphobia #55 (May, 1995), rating it a 4 out of 5 and stated that "Fantasy graphic adventures simply don't come much better than this. Death Gate guarantees 50 hours' fascination and challenge. If you like to take a cerebral approach to your gaming, try to master Death Gate!"

Computer Gaming World nominated Death Gate as its 1994 "Adventure of the Year", although it lost to Relentless: Twinsen's Adventure. The editors wrote of Death Gate, "The quality of the puzzles is evident, but Death Gate also uses compelling atmospheric graphics to distinguish its numerous imaginary worlds."

=== Awards ===
- 1994 Strategy Plus Animated Adventure Game of the Year Award (Runner-up)
- 1994 Computer Game Review Golden Triad Award
- 1994 Interactive Gaming Editor's Choice Award
- 1995 Games Magazine Top 100 Electronic Games of the Year Award
