= Timequest =

1991 video game

- Developer: Legend Entertainment
- Publisher: Legend Entertainment
- Designer: Bob Bates
- Platform: MS-DOS
- Release: 1991
- Genres: Interactive fiction, Adventure
- Mode: Single-player

Timequest is an interactive fiction game for MS-DOS written by Bob Bates and published in 1991 by Legend Entertainment.

== Plot ==
In the year 2090 AD, the use of time machines (called interkrons) is regulated by officers of the Temporal Corps. There is a strict prohibition against travel into the past, because of its potentially disastrous effects on the timestream and the catastrophic consequences for current civilization.

Zeke S. Vettenmyer, a Lieutenant in the Temporal Corps, has stolen an interkron, traveled back into the past, and subtly altered historical situations so that the outcomes of these events will be changed. The world as we know it will be destroyed as the effects of these changes ripple forward towards the present and cause massive disruptions in the timestream.

You are a private in the Temporal Corps. You have been selected to travel into the past and untangle Vettenmyer's twisted plot. You must pursue Vettenmyer across 3,000 years of history, going to the times and places he has visited and reversing the changes he has made which are currently threatening the future that defines your very existence.

== Historical events ==
As the manual notes, there are ten historical events that Vettenmyer has tampered with. They are:

- The death of Julius Caesar, Rome 44 BC
- Attila the Hun's halted attack on Rome 452 AD
- The Crowning of Charlemagne, Rome 800
- An attempted coup by Yahya the Barmakid, who plotted to overthrow Caliph Harun al-Rashid, Baghdad 800
- The signing of the Magna Carta, Dover 1215
- The siege of Peking by Genghis Khan 1215
- Hernán Cortés conquers the Aztecs, Mexico 1519
- Sir Francis Drake visits Queen Elizabeth I, Dover 1588
- Napoleon's attack on Egypt, Cairo 1798
- The planning of Operation Dynamo, the evacuation of Dunkirk before an attack by Hitler, involving visits to Dover and Rome 1940

== Historical figures ==
Several historical figures make appearances in the game besides the ones listed above. They include:

- King Tut
- Moses (as a baby)
- Cleopatra
- Julius Caesar
- Pope Leo I
- King Arthur
- Attila
- Robin Hood
- Montezuma
- William Shakespeare
- Admiral Horatio Nelson
- Napoleon
- Winston Churchill
- Benito Mussolini

== Locations ==
The game features six major locations—Mexico, Dover, Rome, Cairo, Baghdad and Peking—each of which can be visited in various years ranging from 1361 BC to 1940 AD (although Mexico, Cairo and Baghdad cannot be visited in all years).

Famous locations that appear in the game include Lake Texcoco, Teotihuacan, Tenochtitlan, Stonehenge, Runnymede, the Cliffs of Dover, the Circus Maximus, St. Peter's Basilica, the Palazzo Braschi, the Great Pyramids, the Nile River, the Hanging Gardens of Babylon, the Forbidden City and the Great Wall of China. The climax of the game takes place inside the Tower of Babel.

== Dates ==
- 2090 AD (Time HQ)
- 1940 AD (Dover, Rome, Peking)
- 1798 AD (Dover, Rome, Cairo, Baghdad, Peking)
- 1588 AD (Dover, Rome, Cairo, Baghdad, Peking)
- 1519 AD (Mexico, Dover, Rome, Cairo, Baghdad, Peking)
- 1215 AD (Mexico, Dover, Rome, Cairo, Baghdad, Peking)
- 800 AD (Mexico, Dover, Rome, Cairo, Baghdad, Peking)
- 452 AD (Mexico, Dover, Rome, Cairo, Baghdad, Peking)
- 44 BC (Mexico, Dover, Rome, Cairo, Baghdad, Peking)
- 1361 BC (Mexico, Dover, Rome, Cairo, Baghdad, Peking)

== Puzzles ==
Timequest is an extremely non-linear game where the player immediately has access to six geographical locations in nine different time periods. Many of the puzzles can be tackled by picking a particular location and moving forward from the earliest time period (1361 BC). However, like most adventure games, solving puzzles in one location often relies on the use of items obtained elsewhere.

There are also a series of written clues scattered throughout the game, which require some note taking and some insight in putting the clues together into a message.

The main puzzle at the end of the game involves travelling quickly back and forth through time while interacting with versions of your past and future selves. This puzzle resembles similar sequences found in Sorcerer, Discworld and Escape from Monkey Island.
