= The Wheel of Time (video game) =

1999 video game

- Developer: Legend Entertainment
- Publisher: GT Interactive
- Designer: Glen R. Dahlgren
- Composers: Robert Berry, Leif Sorbye
- Engine: Unreal Engine 1
- Platform: Microsoft Windows
- Release: NA: November 9, 1999; EU: November 25, 1999
- Genre: First-person shooter

The Wheel of Time is a first-person shooter video game developed by Legend Entertainment and based on Robert Jordan's fantasy series of the same name. It was released in 1999 by GT Interactive. Nightdive Studios published it on GOG.com in 2022.

== Gameplay ==
The game is based on the Unreal Engine, combining elements of first-person shooter games like Unreal with strategy/role-playing game elements. It can be played either in single-player or multiplayer modes, which determines the course of the game. The single-player gameplay variant is linear and centered on a fictional character named Elayna Sedai, the Keeper of the Chronicles of the White Tower.

In the multiplayer version of the game, the player may act as either Elayna Sedai, the Leader of the Children of the Light, one of the Forsaken, or the Hound, an entirely new character type. This multiplayer version contains two modes: Arena and Citadel. Arena is a basic deathmatch, in which the winner is the player or team who kills the most. Citadel is similar to a capture-the-flag style of gameplay, in which each team must capture the "seal" of the other teams. Seals can be protected in the base through a variety of traps and computer-controlled guards. Though the multiplayer game's play volume was never as high as that of many other first-person shooters, it continued to be played by a loyal group of fans long after its release.

Wheel of Time gives the player an assortment of over 40 ter'angreal — magical artifacts which can be used to cast specific weaves (spells). These artifacts range from offensive weapons to shield and healing spells. Others offer more complex spells such as swapping the player's location with the target. The number and variety of spells available allows for combinations of weaves to be used, as well as effective counterattacks from enemy AI or other players.

== Plot ==
The game's setting in respect to the novels is ambiguous; the storyline was said to precede the novels by some 150 years. Although Robert Jordan was consulted, the game's storyline is not considered canonical for The Wheel of Time setting.

Elayna Sedai of the Brown Ajah, Keeper of the Chronicles, the protagonist and the player's alter ego, is reading a report from an expedition she sent out when she is attacked by an unknown assassin in her office in the White Tower. She is knocked out, and he makes off with an odd, horn-shaped ter'angreal but not the cuendillar seals he was looking for. The Amyrlin subsequently sends Elayna to recover the mysterious ter'angreal, being told only that it is very important.

Elayna follows the assassin and his army of Trollocs to the crumbling city of Shadar Logoth, which is inhabited by unknown evil creatures. She tracks the assassin through the city, battling Trollocs and dark creatures along the way and finally corners the assassin, who admits that he was hired by the Forsaken Ishamael. Ishamael is seeking the seals held by the Amyrlin. The assassin agrees to return the ter'angreal in return for his life. Just as Elayna retrieves the ter'angreal, the assassin is assailed by Mashadar, the evil that consumed Shadar Logoth, manifested as a mist-like creature.

Upon returning to Tar Valon, Elayna finds the White Tower besieged by Trollocs. After helping to secure the tower, Elayna is told that the Amyrlin wants to see her in the basement with the ter'angreal. On her way to the basement, Elayna overhears a group of Black Ajah Aes Sedai with the assassin from Shadar Logoth and another Aes Sedai named Sephraem, a Sitter of the Red Ajah, all of whom are working for Ishamael.

When Elayna finds the Amyrlin, she tells her of the Black Ajah. The Amyrlin then tells Elayna of the importance of the odd ter'angreal: Elayna, a weak channeller, has the potential to be the most powerful being on earth. Since her childhood, the Amyrlin has shielded Elayna from the One Power for her own protection, and the odd ter'angreal is able to unlock that power. Just as the Amyrlin is about to use the ter'angreal on Elayna, the assassin and Sephraem break in, kill the Amyrlin, and take the ter'angreal as well as the Amyrlin's seal.

Elayna takes a few moments to mourn the Amyrlin's passing, then pursues the assassin and his minions as the new acting Amyrlin. They lead her to an empty Aes Sedai expedition site outside a Whitecloak fortress. She is captured by the Whitecloaks and thrown in the dungeon, where a few of the Aes Sedai are located. Elayna learns that some Aes Sedai were able to escape through a portal stone outside the fortress. She manages to escape from her cell and makes her way to the portal stone.

The portal takes her into the Mountains of Mist, near the fortress of Ishamael. She finds the escaped Aes Sedai in the dungeon of the fortress, rescues them, and defends them while they make their way back to the portal stone. Once they are all away, she begins to search the fortress for the Amyrlin's seal, which the assassin, now referred to as the Hound, brought to the fortress.

While searching the fortress, she finds some notes on a long lost ritual to remove from the seals the power with the intent to release the Dark Lord from his prison. She eventually finds the seal, guarded by Sephraem. After defeating her and claiming the seal, Elayna is captured by Ishamael, who prepares to torture her. The Hound comes in and uses the odd ter'angreal to trap Ishamael in a Shield. He then explains that he has succumbed to the chaotic evil of Shadar Logoth, and how he purposefully pitted Ishamael, the Aes Sedai and the Whitecloaks against each other to sow chaos. Elayna and Ishamael are able to escape the Hound's grasp, and Elayna begins gathering seals to complete the aforementioned ritual.

Once they are gathered, Elayna travels to Shayol Ghul, where the ritual must be performed. The Hound arrives, offering to trade the odd ter'angreal, which could bestow untold powers on Elayna, for the seals. To his surprise, Elayna refuses the offer, noting how she had spent her life without those powers. She sends the Hound falling to his death with the artifact and completes the ritual, ensuring that the Dark Lord cannot escape his prison until the Last Battle.

== Development ==
The game was showcased at E3 1998.

Nightdive Studios and GOG.com released the game with updates to support modern personal computers on April 6, 2022 with permission from Red Eagle Games, the current rights holders for the video game adaptations of the Wheel of Time series.

== Reception ==
Reception

Aggregate score
Aggregator	Score
GameRankings	80%

Review scores
Publication	Score
AllGame	3/5
CNET Gamecenter	7/10
Computer Games Strategy Plus	4/5
Computer Gaming World	3.5/5
EP Daily	8/10
Game Informer	8.75/10
GameFan	81%
GameRevolution	B+
GameSpot	8.7/10
GameSpy	87%
IGN	7.3/10
Next Generation	3/5
PC Accelerator	9/10
PC Gamer (US)	90%

The game received favorable reviews according to the review aggregation website GameRankings. Jeff Lundrigan of NextGen called it "a more-than-competent effort, which keeps the flavor of its source material while providing a decent challenge."

Michael Lafferty of GameZone gave it eight out of ten, saying, "If you have played Unreal, and seek to advance along the path of higher and more dangerous game playing, this program is right up your alley. The manual does not provide a quick reference chart, but the controls are so simple to figure out, that you will be immersed in no time. The game also features on-screen prompts to help guide you - at least initially." Peter Olafson of GamePro called it "an elegant 3D game of action and strategy that's compelling, atmospheric, beautiful...and unique." (Note: GamePro gave the game three 4.5/5 scores for graphics, control, and fun factor, and 5/5 for sound.)

According to GameSpy, the game was a commercial failure. It sold 30,085 units in the U.S. by April 2000.

In 2003, the game was rated #10 on GameSpy's list of the most underrated games of all time.
