= Michael J. Lindner =

American judge

Judge, Fairfax County General District Court (19th Judicial Circuit of Virginia)
- In office July 1, 2015 - Present

Personal details
- Born: Michael Joshua Lindner; 1959 (age 66–67) Tallahassee, Florida, U.S.
- Education: Kenyon College; American University Washington College of Law (J.D.)

Michael Joshua Lindner is a judge of the 19th Judicial Circuit General District Court of Virginia in Fairfax County, Virginia, in the United States, elected February 25, 2015 by the Virginia Senate and the Virginia House of Delegates, for a 6-year term commencing July 1, 2015. His election was preceded by a selection process wherein candidates were evaluated by the Fairfax Bar Judicial Selection Committee which issued an Executive Summary on his candidacy.

== Education ==
He received a Bachelor of Arts in history from Kenyon College in 1981. A graduate of the American University Washington College of Law, Lindner was admitted to the Virginia State Bar in 2001.

== Career ==
Despite success in producing computer video games at Legend Entertainment, Lindner switched careers and launched his own law firm in Fairfax in 2001, focusing primarily on criminal and traffic litigation.

As a criminal defense attorney, he handled difficult cases such as homicide trials and representation of persons wrongly held in custody. He served as a substitute judge from 2010 to 2015 and presided over causes in General District and Juvenile and Domestic Relations District courts throughout Northern Virginia. He helped reinvigorate, and from 2012 to 2015, was Co-Chair of the Fairfax Bar Criminal Law Practice Section, serving for the first year in collaboration with David Bernhard.

As a Judge, he has pioneered and promoted implementation of the model Veterans Treatment Docket program, and presided over its first graduates. The program takes a novel hybrid approach, integrating the resolution of criminal cases for criminally-involved veterans with mental health and substance abuse treatment and veteran mentorship. The program has not been without controversy, initially struggling to gain legislative support in the Virginia General Assembly. However, the Supreme Court of Virginia enacted a rule regularizing the existence of such specialty dockets. Lindner's accomplishments both in private practice and as a judge, and perseverance in nurturing the Veterans Treatment Docket, resulted in him being named a "Leader in the Law" by Virginia Lawyers Weekly in 2016.
