= Computer Game Review =

American magazine

- Cover of June 1996 issue
- Categories: Video and computer game magazine
- Frequency: Monthly
- Publisher: Sendai Publishing
- Founded: 1991
- Final issue: 1996
- Country: United States
- Language: English
- ISSN: 1062-113X

Computer Game Review was a print monthly magazine covering both computer gaming and video gaming. The magazine was started in 1991. Also known as Computer Game Review and 16-Bit Entertainment, and then later as Computer Game Review and CD-Rom Entertainment. The headquarters of the magazine which was part of Sendai Publication Group was in Lombard, Illinois.

Reviews typically consisted of a short, impartial synopsis of plot and gameplay, with separate scores assigned subjectively by each of three reviewers. Games were rated out of 100, and if the game received a high enough ranking it would receive either a Platinum or Golden Triad Award.

The magazine folded in 1996, when Sendai Media Group was bought by Ziff-Davis, owner of the competing Computer Gaming World.
