= Index of DOS games (A) =

This is an index of DOS games.

This list has been split into multiple pages. Please use the Table of Contents to browse it.

Title	Released	Developer(s)	Publisher(s)
A Line in the Sand	1992	Strategic Simulations	Strategic Simulations
A-10 Tank Killer	1989	Dynamix	Dynamix
A320 Airbus	1993	Thalion Software	Thalion Software
AAARGH!	1988	Synergistic Software	Arcadia Systems
Abandoned Places: A Time for Heroes	1992	ArtGame	International Computer Entertainment
ABC Monday Night Football	1989	Park Place Productions	Data East
ABC Wide World of Sports Boxing	1991	Acme Interactive Productions	Data East
Abrams Battle Tank	1988	Dynamix	Sega, Electronic Arts
Absolute Pinball	1995	21st Century Entertainment	21st Century Entertainment
Absolute Zero	1995	Edirol	Eidos Interactive
Abuse	1996	Crack Dot Com	Origin Systems
ACE: Air Combat Emulator	1987	Ian Martin	Cascade Games
Add & Subtract With ALF	1988	Vision Software	Vision Software
Ace of Aces	1987	Artech Digital Entertainment	Accolade
Aces of the Deep	1994	Dynamix	Sierra On-Line
Aces of the Pacific	1992	Dynamix	Sierra Entertainment
Acheton	1987	Topologika	Topologika
Action Fighter	1989	Sega	Firebird Software
Action Soccer	1995	Ubisoft Montpellier	Ubi Soft
Action SuperCross	1997	Balázs Rózsa	
Actua Soccer	1995	Gremlin Interactive	Greenwood Entertainment
Actua Soccer - Club Edition	1997	Gremlin Interactive	Gremlin Interactive
Advanced Dungeons & Dragons: Heroes of the Lance	1988	U.S. Gold	Strategic Simulations
Advanced NetWars	1997	Edward Hill	Caldera
Advantage Tennis	1991	Infogrames	Infogrames
Adventure Construction Set	1987	Electronic Arts	Electronic Arts
Adventures of Captain Comic, The	1988	Michael Denio	Michael Denio
The Adventures of Down Under Dan	1995	Guildsoft Games	PowerVision
Adventures of Maddog Williams in the Dungeons of Duridian, The	1992	Game Crafters	Game Crafters
Adventures of Robbo	1994	xLand Games	Epic MegaGames
Adventures of Robin Hood, The	1992	Millennium Interactive	Millennium Interactive
Adventures of Tintin: Prisoners of the Sun	1997	Infogrames	Infogrames
Adventures of Willy Beamish, The	1991	Dynamix	Sierra On-Line
AEGIS: Guardian of the Fleet	1994	Microplay Software	Time Warner Interactive
Aethra Chronicles	1994	Michael W. Lawrence	Michael W. Lawrence
After Burner	1989	Unlimited Software	Sega
After Burner II	1989	Weebee Games	Sega
Afterlife	1997	LucasArts	LucasArts
After the War	1989	Dinamic Software	Dinamic Software
Agent USA	1984	Tom Snyder Productions	Scholastic
AH-64D Longbow	1996	Origin Systems	Electronic Arts
AH-64D Longbow - Flash Point: Korea	1996	Origin Systems	Electronic Arts
Air	1993	Softstar Entertainment	Softstar Entertainment
Airball	1987	Microdeal	Microdeal
Airborne Ranger	1988	Microprose	Microprose
Air Bucks	1992	Impressions Games	Sierra On-Line
Air Power	1996	Rowan Software	Mindscape
Albion	1996	Blue Byte	Blue Byte
Alcatraz	1992	221B Software Development	Infogrames
Alex Higgins' World Snooker	1986	Lindensoft	Amstrad
ALF's Thinking Skills	1993	Vision Software	Vision Software
ALF's U.S. Geography	1993	Vision Software	Vision Software
ALF's World of Words	1988	Vision Software	Vision Software
ALF: The First Adventure	1987	Box Office, Inc.	Box Office, Inc.
Alien	1982	Unknown	Unknown
Alien Breed	1993	Team17	Team17
Alien Breed: Tower Assault	1994	Team17	Team17
Alien Carnage	1994-11-02	Interactive Binary Illusions/SubZero Software	Apogee Software
Alien Incident	1996	Housemarque	GameTek
Alien Legacy	1995	Ybarra Productions	Sierra On-Line
Alien Odyssey	1995	Argonaut Games	Philips Interactive Media
Alien Olympics 2044 AD	1994	Dark Technologies	Mindscape
Alien Rampage	1996	Inner Circle Creations	Softdisk
Aliens: A Comic Book Adventure	1995	Cryo Interactive	Mindscape
Alien Syndrome	1989	HSP	Sega
Alien Trilogy	1995-12-31	Probe Software	Acclaim Entertainment
Alien Virus	1994	Funsoft	Vic Tokai
All Dogs Go to Heaven	1989	Polarware/Penguin Software	Merit Software
Alley Cat	1984	Bill Williams	IBM
All New World of Lemmings	1994	DMA Design	Psygnosis
Alone in the Dark	1992	Interplay Entertainment	Infogrames
Alone in the Dark 2	1993	Infogrames	Interplay Entertainment
Alone in the Dark 3	1995	Infogrames	Interplay Entertainment
Alpha Waves	1990	Infogrames	Infogrames
Al-Qadim: The Genie's Curse	1994	Stormfront Studios	Strategic Simulations
Altered Beast	1990	Unlimited Software	Sega
Altered Destiny	1990	Accolade	Accolade
Alter Ego	1986	Activision	Activision
Alternate Reality: The City	1988	Datasoft	Electronic Arts
Amazing Spider-Man, The	1990	Paragon Software	Paragon Software
Amazon	1984	Trillium Corp.	Trillium Corp.
Amazon: Guardians of Eden	1992	Access Software	Access Software
Amazon Trail, The	1993	MECC	MECC
American Dream: The Business Management Simulation	1985	Blue Chip Software	Blue Chip Software
Amberstar	1992	Thalion Software	Thalion Software
Ambush at Sorinor	1993	Mindcraft	Mindcraft
American Gladiators	1992	GameTek	GameTek
A Mind Forever Voyaging	1985-08-14	Infocom	Infocom
Amnesia	1986	Cognetics Corporation	Electronic Arts
Amok	1997	Scavenger/Lemon	Sega
Amulets & Armor	1997	United Game Artists	United Game Artists
Anacreon: Reconstruction 4021	1987	Thinking Machine Associates	Thinking Machine Associates
An American Tail: The Computer Adventures of Fievel and His Friends	1993	Manley & Associates	Capstone Software
Anchorhead	1998	Michael S. Gentry	
Ancient Art of War, The	1984	Evryware	Broderbund
Ancient Art of War at Sea, The	1987	Evryware	Broderbund
Ancient Art of War in the Skies, The	1992	Evryware	Broderbund
Ancient Domains of Mystery	1994	Thomas Biskup	Thomas Biskup
Ancient Land of Ys	1989	Nihon Falcom	Broderbund
Ancients 1: Death Watch	1993	Farr-Ware	Epic MegaGames
Ancients 2: Approaching Evil	1994	Farr-Ware	Epic MegaGames
Andromeda Conquest	1982	Avalon Hill	Avalon Hill
Angband	1992	Unknown	Unknown
Angel Devoid: Face of the Enemy	1995	Electric Dreams Software	Mindscape
Annals of Rome	1988	Rome Software	PSS
Another World	1991	Delphine Software	Interplay Entertainment
Anvil of Dawn	1995	DreamForge Intertainment	New World Computing
Apache	1995	Team17	Team17
Apache Longbow	1995	Interactive Magic	Digital Integration Ltd.
Apollo 18: Mission to the Moon	1988	Artech Studios	Accolade
A.P.B.	1989	Domark	Atari
Apple Panic	1982	Broderbund	Broderbund
Arachnophobia	1991	BlueSky Software	Disney Interactive Studios
Arcade Pool	1994	Team17	Team17
Arcade Volleyball	1989	Rhett Anderson	
Armored Moon: The Next Eden	1998	Sung Jin Multimedia	Microforum International
Archimedean Dynasty	1997-04-04	Massive Development	Blue Byte
Archipelagos	1990	Astral Software	Logotron
Archon: The Light and the Dark	1983	Free Fall Associates	Electronic Arts
Archon Ultra	1994	Free Fall Associates	Strategic Simulations
Arctic Adventure	1991	Apogee Software	Apogee Software
Arcticfox	1986	Dynamix	Electronic Arts
Arctic Moves	1995	Dinamic Multimedia	Dinamic Multimedia
Arkanoid	1988	NovaLogic	Taito
Arkanoid II-Revenge of Doh	1989	NovaLogic	Taito
Ark of Time	1997	Trecision	KOEI
Armada 2525	1991	Interstel	Interstel
Armor Alley	1991	360 Pacific	360 Pacific
Armored Fist	1994	NovaLogic	Electronic Arts
Armour-Geddon	1991	Psygnosis	Psygnosis
Army Moves	1989	Dinamic Software	Dinamic Software
Arnhem	1985	R. T. Smith	Cases Computer Simulations
Arnie II	1993	Zeppelin Games	Zeppelin Games
Arthur: The Quest for Excalibur	1989	Infocom	Infocom
Arya Vaiv	1994	Megadream Software	Dongleware Verlags
Ascendancy	1995	The Logic Factory	Broderbund
Ashes of Empire	1992	GameTek	GameTek
Assault Rigs	1996	Psygnosis	Psygnosis
Asterix & Obelix	1996	Infogrames	Infogrames
AstroFire	1994	ORT Software	ORT Software
Atlantis: The Lost Tales	1997	Cryo Interactive	Interplay Entertainment
Atlas	1995	Artdink	Sunflowers Interactive Entertainment Software
Atomino	1990	Psygnosis	Blue Byte
Atomix	1990	Thalion Software	Softtouch
A-Train	1992	Artdink	Maxis
At the Carnival	1990	Miles Computing	Miles Computing
Austerlitz	1989	Turcan Research Systems	Mirrorsoft
Autoduel	1988	Origin Systems	Origin Systems
AV8B Harrier Assault	1992	Sims Limited	Domark
Avalon Hill's Advanced Civilization	1995	Avalon Hill	Avalon Hill
Avoid the Noid	1989	California Merchandising Concepts	ShareData
Azrael's Tear	1996	Intelligent Games	Mindscape
