= List of games by Epic Games =

Video games by developer/publisher

The current logo of Epic Games

Epic Games is an American video game and software developer based in Cary, North Carolina. It was founded by Tim Sweeney as Potomac Computer Systems in 1991, originally located in his parents' house in Potomac, Maryland. After releasing one game under that name, ZZT (1991), Sweeney renamed the company to Epic MegaGames in early 1992 "to make it look like we were a big company" even though it had no other employees or offices. Over the next few years, the company continued to make PC games, largely self-published, including the side-scrollers Jill of the Jungle (1992) and Jazz Jackrabbit (1994). They additionally published titles by other developers such as Epic Pinball (1993) by Digital Extremes and Tyrian (1995) by Eclipse Software. Epic also slowly expanded in size, reaching 8 employees by 1994.

Beginning with the 1996 game Fire Fight, Epic ceased its publishing and self-publishing operations, and after the release and success of Unreal (1998) renamed itself in 1999 to Epic Games and moved to Raleigh, North Carolina; it and a temporary office in Canada during Unreal's development were the first time the company had a central office for their employees. After the name change, the company focused almost solely on the Unreal series of shooters for the next few years, and expanded from PC games to console games. In 2006 the company launched its Gears of War series of games, and in 2010 the company moved into mobile games with the Infinity Blade series after purchasing Chair Entertainment. Epic returned to retail publishing in 2015 for its own titles, and has solely self-published since. In addition to games, Epic develops and licenses the Unreal Engine, which is also used as the game engine for many of its own games, and runs the Epic Games Store, a digital video game storefront for Microsoft Windows and macOS.

Sweeney described the history of the company in 2016 as four eras: the shareware era from founding through 1997 as the company grew to 15 employees; the Unreal era from 1998 to 2005 as the company focused on developing that franchise through external publishers and grew to 25 employees; the Gears of War era from 2006 to 2011 as the company shifted focus to console games and grew to around 200 employees; and the current era where the company moved back to PC games and self-publishing, spinning off or closing some of its subsidiary developers such as People Can Fly and Big Huge Games. This latter era has instead become dominated by the multi-platform Fortnite Battle Royale and related games, which is one of the most-played video game franchises of all time with over 350 million registered players. Epic Games has developed around 40 games since 1991 and published over 20 more, and has multiple games under development.

== Video games ==
Epic Games has used the names Potomac Computer Systems, Epic MegaGames, and Epic Games; the name given for the company is the one used at the time of a game's release. Many of the games under the Epic MegaGames brand were released as a set of separate episodes, which were purchasable and playable separately or as a group. In many cases the initial episode of a game was freely distributed as shareware to drive interest in the other purchasable episodes. Titles are listed for games that gave individual names to their episodes instead of episode numbers.

=== Developed games ===
List of games
Title (Episodes)	System	Release date	Developer(s)	Publisher(s)	Ref(s)
ZZT ("Town of ZZT", "Caves of ZZT", "Dungeons of ZZT", "City of ZZT")	MS-DOS	January 15, 1991	Potomac Computer Systems	Potomac Computer Systems	
Best of ZZT ("The Secret of Headhunter Isle", "Royal Treasures")	MS-DOS	1992	Epic MegaGames (Note: Best of ZZT and ZZT's Revenge were collections of ZZT games made by players with the included editor and submitted in a contest.)	Epic MegaGames	
ZZT's Revenge ("Ezanya", "Fantasy", "Crypt", "Smiley Guy", "Manor", "Darbytown")	MS-DOS	1992	Epic MegaGames	Epic MegaGames	
Super ZZT ("Lost Forest", "Monster Zoo", "Proving Grounds")	MS-DOS	1992	Epic MegaGames	Epic MegaGames	
Adventure Math	MS-DOS	1992	Epic MegaGames	Epic MegaGames	
Kiloblaster ("Death of a Starship", "No Way Out", "The Final Battle")	MS-DOS	1992	Epic MegaGames	Epic MegaGames	
Jill of the Jungle ("Jill of the Jungle", "Jill Goes Underground", "Jill Saves the Prince")	MS-DOS	June 1992	Epic MegaGames	Epic MegaGames	
Dare to Dream ("In a Darkened Room", "Search of the Beast", "Christian's Lair")	Windows	1993	Epic MegaGames	Epic MegaGames	
Silverball	MS-DOS	December 1993	Epic MegaGames, Digital Extremes	MicroLeague	
Xargon ("Beyond Reality", "The Secret Chamber", "Xargon's Fury")	MS-DOS	January 15, 1994	Epic MegaGames	Epic MegaGames	
Jazz Jackrabbit ("Turtle Terror", "Ballistic Bunny", "Rabbit's Revenge", "Gene Machine", "The Chase Is On", "The Final Clash") (Note: The 1994 CD-ROM release of Jazz Jackrabbit, titled Jazz Jackrabbit CD, contained three additional episodes named "The Lost Episodes". Additionally, two special holiday editions were produced (Holiday Hare, 1994 and Holiday Hare '95, 1995), each containing additional holiday-themed levels.)	MS-DOS	July 30, 1994	Epic MegaGames	Epic MegaGames	
Extreme Pinball	MS-DOS, PlayStation	October 1995	Epic MegaGames, Digital Extremes, High Score Entertainment	Electronic Arts	
Fire Fight	Windows	June 24, 1996	Chaos Works, Epic MegaGames	Electronic Arts	
7th Legion	Windows	August 26, 1997	Epic MegaGames, Vision Software	MicroProse	
Jazz Jackrabbit 2 ("Formerly a Prince", "Jazz in Time", "Flashback", "Monkey Trouble")	Windows, macOS	May 7, 1998	Epic MegaGames, Orange Games	Gathering of Developers	
Unreal	Windows, macOS	May 22, 1998	Epic MegaGames, Digital Extremes, Legend Entertainment	GT Interactive	
Age of Wonders	Windows	November 16, 1999	Epic MegaGames, Triumph Studios	Gathering of Developers	
Unreal Tournament	Windows, macOS, Linux, PlayStation 2, Dreamcast	November 30, 1999	Epic Games, Digital Extremes	GT Interactive	
Unreal Tournament 2003	Windows, macOS, Linux	September 30, 2002	Epic Games, Digital Extremes	Infogrames	
Unreal Championship	Xbox	November 12, 2002	Epic Games, Digital Extremes	Infogrames	
Unreal Tournament 2004	Windows, macOS, Linux	March 16, 2004	Epic Games, Digital Extremes	Atari	
Unreal Championship 2: The Liandri Conflict	Xbox	April 18, 2005	Epic Games	Midway Games	
Gears of War	Windows, Xbox 360	November 7, 2006	Epic Games	Microsoft Game Studios	
Unreal Tournament 3	Windows, PlayStation 3, Xbox 360	November 19, 2007	Epic Games	Midway Games	
Gears of War 2	Xbox 360	November 7, 2008	Epic Games	Microsoft Game Studios	
Shadow Complex	Xbox 360	August 19, 2009	Epic Games, Chair Entertainment	Microsoft Game Studios	
Infinity Blade	iOS	December 9, 2010	Epic Games, Chair Entertainment	Epic Games	
Bulletstorm	Windows, PlayStation 3, Xbox 360	February 22, 2011	Epic Games, People Can Fly	Electronic Arts	
Gears of War 3	Xbox 360	September 20, 2011	Epic Games	Microsoft Studios	
Infinity Blade II	iOS	December 1, 2011	Epic Games, Chair Entertainment	Epic Games	
Gears of War: Judgment	Xbox 360	March 19, 2013	Epic Games, People Can Fly	Microsoft Studios	
Infinity Blade III	iOS	September 18, 2013	Epic Games, Chair Entertainment	Epic Games	
Shadow Complex Remastered	Windows, macOS, PlayStation 4, Xbox One	December 3, 2015	Epic Games, Chair Entertainment	Epic Games	
Robo Recall	Windows	March 1, 2017	Epic Games	Epic Games	
Fortnite Battle Royale (Note: Fortnite Battle Royale, Fortnite Creative, Fortnite: Save the World, Lego Fortnite, Rocket Racing, Fortnite Festival, and Fortnite Ballistic are all separate games which are accessed through the Fortnite launcher and share a microtransaction storefront.)	Windows, macOS, PlayStation 4, PlayStation 5, Xbox One, Xbox Series X/S, Android, iOS, Nintendo Switch	September 26, 2017 (Note: Fortnite Battle Royale was released for free early access on September 26, 2017, but this was later made the official release date, as the changes to the game became part of its ongoing nature rather than pre-release development)	Epic Games	Epic Games	
Fortnite Creative	Windows, macOS, PlayStation 4, PlayStation 5 Xbox One, Xbox Series X/S, Android, iOS, Nintendo Switch	December 13, 2018	Epic Games	Epic Games	
Battle Breakers	Windows, macOS, Android, iOS	November 13, 2019 (Note: Battle Breakers was soft launched in Australia, New Zealand, and the Philippines in April 2017)	Epic Games, Chair Entertainment	Epic Games	
Fortnite: Save the World	Windows, macOS, PlayStation 4, PlayStation 5, Xbox One, Xbox Series X/S	June 29, 2020 (Note: Fortnite: Save the World was released for paid early access on July 25, 2017, and then was released as a pay-to-play game on June 29, 2020)	Epic Games, People Can Fly	Epic Games	
Lego Fortnite	Windows, PlayStation 4, PlayStation 5, Xbox One, Xbox Series X/S, Android, Nintendo Switch	December 7, 2023	Epic Games	Epic Games	
Rocket Racing	Windows, PlayStation 4, PlayStation 5, Xbox One, Xbox Series X/S, Android, Nintendo Switch	December 8, 2023	Psyonix	Epic Games	
Fortnite Festival	Windows, PlayStation 4, PlayStation 5, Xbox One, Xbox Series X/S, Android, Nintendo Switch	December 9, 2023	Harmonix	Epic Games	
Fortnite Ballistic	Windows, PlayStation 4, PlayStation 5, Xbox One, Xbox Series X/S, Android, Nintendo Switch	December 11, 2024 (Note: Fortnite Ballistic was released in early access on December 11, 2024, but was shut down on April 16, 2026 without ever being "officially" released.)	Harmonix	Epic Games	

=== Published games ===
In addition to publishing many of its own games, Epic published several titles by other developers in the early 1990s as Epic MegaGames before ceasing publishing operations. In 2020, it launched Epic Games Publishing as a new publishing wing.

Games published as Epic MegaGames
Title (Episodes)	System	Release date	Developer(s)	Ref(s)
Brix	MS-DOS	1992 (Note: Brix had a followup release titled "Brix 2 Deluxe" which served as the registered version.)	MicroLeague	
Castle of the Winds ("A Question of Vengeance", "Lifthransir's Bane")	Windows	1992 (Note: Castle of the Winds was self-published as shareware by SaadaSoft in 1989, with "A Question of Vengeance" released for free and "Lifthransir's Bane" sold. The Epic Games version was a retail release of enhanced versions of both episodes.)	SaadaSoft	
OverKill ("Edrax", "Gallifrey", "Hoth", "Voltair", "Pax Verde", "Unknown!")	MS-DOS	1992	Tech-Noir	
Ancients 1: Death Watch	MS-DOS	1993	Farr-Ware	
Electro Man	MS-DOS	1993 (Note: Electro Man was an enhanced version of the original game, self-published by X LanD Computer Games in Poland in 1992 as Electro Body) (Note: Electro Man, The Adventures of Robbo, and Heartlight were released together in 1994 by Epic as the Epic Puzzle Pack.)	X LanD Computer Games	
The Adventures of Robbo	MS-DOS	1993 (Note: The MS-DOS release of The Adventures of Robbo was an enhanced version of the original game, published by LK Avalon in 1989 in Poland as Robbo for Atari 8-bit computers.)	X LanD Computer Games	
Solar Winds ("The Escape", "Universe") (Note: Solar Winds' second episode was released as both "Solar Winds: Galaxy" and "Solar Winds II: Universe")	MS-DOS	1993	Stone Interactive Media	
Zone 66 ("Foreign Shores", "Ice Wind", "Desert Heat", "War Plains", "Highway Fury", "Plantation Crash", "Hell", "Final Frontier")	MS-DOS	1993	Renaissance	
Ken's Labyrinth ("Search for Sparky", "Sparky's Revenge", "Find the Way Home")	MS-DOS	March 21, 1993 (Note: The Epic MegaGames release of Ken's Labyrinth was an expanded and enhanced version of the original game, self-published by Ken Silverman as Advanced Systems on January 1, 1993)	Ken Silverman	
Epic Pinball	MS-DOS	November 6, 1993	Digital Extremes	
Ancients II: Approaching Evil	MS-DOS	1994	Farr-Ware	
Heartlight	MS-DOS	1994 (Note: Heartlight was originally published by LK Avalon in Poland in 1990 for Atari 8-bit computers)	X LanD Computer Games	
Epic Baseball	MS-DOS	February 1994	MicroLeague	
One Must Fall: 2097	MS-DOS	October 10, 1994	Diversions Entertainment	
Radix: Beyond the Void	MS-DOS	July 1, 1995	Neural Storm Entertainment	
Tyrian ("Escape", "Treachery", "Mission: Suicide", "An End to Fate")	MS-DOS (Note: Tyrian was re-released shortly after launch as Tyrian 2.0 with a fourth episode. It was later ported to Windows in 1999 (with a fifth episode named "Hazudra Fodder") as Tyrian 2000 without involvement by Epic Games. Additionally, Game Boy Color and Game Boy Advance versions were developed by World Tree Games but cancelled; the compiled game codes were released for free in 2007.)	September 14, 1995	Eclipse Software	

Games published as Epic Games Publishing
Title	System	Release date	Developer(s)	Ref(s)
Fall Guys	Windows, PlayStation 4, Xbox One, PlayStation 5, Xbox Series X/S, Nintendo Switch	March 2, 2021 (Note: Fall Guys was published by Devolver Digital from August 4, 2020, until March 2, 2021, when its developer Mediatonic was purchased by Epic Games)	Mediatonic	
Alan Wake Remastered	Windows, PlayStation 4, Xbox One, PlayStation 5, Xbox Series X/S, Nintendo Switch	October 5, 2021	Remedy Entertainment	
Rocket League Sideswipe	iOS, Android	November 15, 2021	Psyonix	
Kid A Mnesia Exhibition	Windows, PlayStation 5, macOS	November 18, 2021	Namethemachine / Arbitrarily Good Productions	
PC Building Simulator 2	Windows, PlayStation 5, Xbox Series X/S	October 12, 2022	Spiral House Ltd.	
Rumbleverse	Windows, PlayStation 4, Xbox One, PlayStation 5, Xbox Series X/S	August 11, 2022	Iron Galaxy	
Touch Type Tale	Windows	March 28, 2023	Pumpernickel Studio	
Alan Wake II	Windows, PlayStation 5, Xbox Series X/S	October 27, 2023	Remedy Entertainment	
End of Abyss	Windows, PlayStation 5, Xbox Series X/S	October 1, 2026	Section 9 Interactive	
Infintitesimals	Windows, PlayStation 5, Xbox Series X/S	2026	Cubit Studios	
Out of Words	Windows, PlayStation 5, Xbox Series X/S, Nintendo Switch 2	2027	Kong Orange, WiredFly	
gen ATLAS	Windows, PlayStation 5, Xbox Series X/S	2027	genDESIGN	

=== Cancelled games ===
Title	Cancellation date	Developer(s)	Ref(s).
Bulletstorm 2	2012	Epic Games, People Can Fly	
Gears of War: Exile	2012	Epic Games	
Infinity Blade Dungeons	2013	Epic Games, Impossible Studios	
Paragon	2018 (Note: Paragon was released in pay to play early access on March 3, 2016, and free-to-play early access on February 4, 2017)	Epic Games	
Unreal Tournament	2018 (Note: Unreal Tournament was made available to players on Windows, macOS, and Linux during development beginning on March 3, 2015, with these players able to contribute code or resources for potential inclusion in the game. In December 2018 development was halted, though the existing game was still available to players)	Epic Games	
Spyjinx	2020 (Note: Spyjinx was made available as a beta to players in Malaysia and Australia in April 2020, but after the beta concluded a few months later no further announcements or releases were made.)	Epic Games, Chair Entertainment, Bad Robot	
