= Index of DOS games (Z) =

This is an index of DOS games.

This list has been split into multiple pages. Please use the Table of Contents to browse it.

| Title | Released | Developer(s) | Publisher(s) |
|---|---|---|---|
| Z | 1996 | Bitmap Brothers | Renegade Software |
| Zak McKracken and the Alien Mindbenders | 1988 | LucasArts | LucasArts |
| Zany Golf | 1988 | Sandcastle Productions | Electronic Arts |
| Zaxxon | 1984 | Sega | Sega |
| Zeliard | 1990 | Game Arts | Sierra On-Line |
| Zephyr | 1994 | New World Computing | New World Computing |
| Zeppelin: Giants of the Sky | 1994 | Ikarion Software | Ikarion Software |
| Zone 66 | 1993 | Renaissance Studio | Epic MegaGames |
| Zone Raiders | 1995 | Image Space Incorporated | Virgin Interactive |
| Zool | 1993 | Gremlin Interactive | Electronic Arts |
| Zool 2 | 1994 | Gremlin Graphics | Gremlin Interactive |
| Zoop | 1995 | Hookstone | Viacom New Media |
| Zork I | 1982 | Infocom | Infocom |
| Zork II | 1983 | Infocom | Infocom |
| Zork III | 1984 | Infocom | Infocom |
| Zork Nemesis | 1996 | Zombie Inc. | Activision |
| Zork Zero | 1988 | Infocom | Infocom |
| Zorro | 1995 | Capstone Software | Capstone Software |
| Zurk's Learning Safari | 1993 | Soleil Software | Soleil Software |
| Zyll | 1984 | IBM | IBM |
| ZZT | 1991 | Epic MegaGames | Epic MegaGames |
