= Vulcan: The Tunisian Campaign =

1986 video game

- Developer: Cases Computer Simulations
- Publisher: Cases Computer Simulations
- Designer: Robert T. Smith
- Platforms: Amiga, Amstrad CPC, Atari ST, MS-DOS, ZX Spectrum
- Release: 1986
- Genre: Computer wargame

Vulcan: The Tunisian Campaign was published in 1986 by Cases Computer Simulations as the third in a series of computer wargames written for the ZX Spectrum by Robert T. Smith. It follows the similarly styled Arnhem and Desert Rats. Ports were released for the Amstrad CPC, Amiga, Atari ST, and MS-DOS.

== Gameplay ==
Vulcan: The Tunisian Campaign is a game in which players can play through four tactical level scenarios, or the entire strategic level of Operation Vulcan in the Tunisian Campaign in 1943.

== Reception ==
Reception

Awards
Publication	Award
Crash	Crash Smash
Sinclair User	SU Classic

H. E. Dille reviewed the game for Computer Gaming World, and stated that "Vulcan is a fine game for novice and intermediate level wargarners, or anyone with a particular passion for this period. The improvements made to the operating system are logical and appreciated, although long term re-playability is still an issue. Bottom line: Nothing truly innovative, but recommended nonetheless."

Phillipa Irving concluded in Crash issue 39, "This is Spectrum wargaming at its very best; complex in operation, wide in scope, and easy to use".
