= Nevada Smith (disambiguation) =

Nevada Smith is a 1966 American Western film.

Nevada Smith may also refer to:

- Nevada Smith (1975 film), a TV Western based on the 1966 film
- Nevada Smith, a fictional character played by Alan Ladd in the film The Carpetbaggers
- Nevada Smith (basketball) (born 1981), an American basketball coach
- Nevada Smith, a playable character in the Apogee games Pharaoh's Tomb and Arctic Adventure
