= The Tone Rebellion =

1997 video game

- Developer: The Logic Factory
- Publisher: Virgin Interactive Entertainment
- Platform: Windows
- Release: 7 November 1997
- Genre: Real-time strategy (4X)
- Modes: Single player, multiplayer

The Tone Rebellion is a 1997 video game developed by The Logic Factory and published by Virgin Interactive Entertainment for Microsoft Windows. It is a science fiction-themed real-time strategy game in which players control a tribe of levitating beings who must defend their islands from a creature called the Leviathan by collecting and harnessing a substance known as the Tone Flow. The developers aimed to create a visually and mechanically original strategy game that departed from the military-themed titles of the time, using lessons learned from their previous title, Ascendancy. Upon release, critics praised the game's visual presentation, original concept, and lack of resemblance to other strategy games of the time, and expressed mixed opinions on its strategy gameplay, which some found confusing and difficult to control.

== Gameplay ==
Level design is set across a series of islands, which players expand across by constructing buildings on predefined nodes.

The Tone Rebellion is set in an alien science fiction world inhabited by tribes of levitating beings named "floaters", who have been invaded by the forces of the Leviathan. Players lead one of the four groups of floaters — the Mystics, Seekers, Protectors, and Lifegivers — to engage in battles against the Leviathan and its forces. Floaters sustain their production and buildings by cultivating magical power from a resource named the Tone, a substance described as "the essence of life" collected from pools. The Leviathan, which has tapped into the power of the Tone, has become extremely powerful, and split the world into several fragmented islands.

The objective of each level is to expand across the islands of the map and defeat the Leviathan and its forces. Each map features between seven to fifteen islands, the number of which can be adjusted along with the difficulty level. To defeat the Leviathan, players must unlock Glyphs across islands on the map; obtaining all Glyphs creates a unit named the Awaked One, which alone can defeat the Leviathan on the final island on the map. Maps are depicted in a three-quarter top-down perspective.

Players start with a small base with several units called floaters, and must use them to collect resources named Tone from pools set in the level to supply energy to all units and buildings. To expand the space where players can construct buildings, they must place Spreaders across the map. This allows players to place a building on a set location named a Node when it is within the radius of a Spreader. Resources are turned into power for structures by creating one of two types of generators: Structure Generators, which power buildings, and Crystal Generators, which provides energy to floaters to function. Players issue commands to floaters indirectly by assigning tasks to the buildings they are connected to, and can increase the priority of an assigned task or cancel it in a chain of multiple commands. Structures include Dojos, which produce offensive units, with more advanced Dojos building stronger troops and troops that can cast 20 different magic spells, including combat spells or healing other units. Units gain experience between levels, granting additional powers.

The Tone Rebellion supports multiplayer play over the Internet or IPX connection. Multiplayer matches can be made with up to three other players; whilst players can compete against one another, they must co-operate to defeat the Leviathan to win the match.

== Development ==
The Tone Rebellion was developed by The Logic Factory, a Texas-based company founded by former Origin Systems employees in 1994, who first developed the real-time strategy game Ascendancy in 1995. Studio producer and co-founder Todd Templeman stated that the developers aimed to create a title that was "completely original", with "mythology, fantasy and dreams" forming the basis of a concept that entirely departed from the "blood and guts" of military-themed strategy games. Although seeking to create a distinct atmosphere instead of creating a sequel to Ascendancy, the developers used feedback from their debut to improve the design of its artificial intelligence, resource management mechanics and sense of progression. Templeman stated that the co-operative multiplayer approach was inspired by developers teaming up to play multiplayer matches of WarCraft against the computer. The game was developed over an 18-month period.

The Tone Rebellion was announced by The Logic Factory on 24 March 1997, and published on 7 November 1997 for Microsoft Windows by Virgin Interactive Entertainment, replacing an earlier publishing agreement with Broderbund. The soundtrack, composed by Nenad Vugrinec, was packaged in a separate audio CD-ROM along with the game.

== Reception ==
Reception

Review scores
Publication	Score
Computer Games Strategy Plus	3/5
Computer Gaming World	4/5
GameRevolution	4/10
GameSpot	8.1/10
PC Games (US)	A−
PC PowerPlay	80%
PC Zone	84%
APC	4/5
Boot	5/10

Several critics stated that the game featured a strikingly original and innovative design, with PC Zone stating that the game was original and had "nothing immediately identifiable" with the typical soldiers, races, or spaceships of its contemporaries. The visual design was also generally praised, with reviewers highlighting the sprites. Critics also enjoyed the game's music, considering that it complemented its visual presentation and atmosphere. Describing its visuals and music as an "unparalleled artistic achievement", Computer Games Strategy Plus commended the music and ambience for its "perfect mood". PC Games praised its "graphical panache and fanciful imagination", considering its creatures "fully ingenious" and its world "delightfully imaginative". GameSpot felt the game broke "no new visual technological ground", but the game was a "surprising departure from the norm" and its soundtrack was "evocative".

Reviews assessed the gameplay mechanics were both unique and atypical for real-time strategy titles of the time, with some comparing it to a puzzle game. Critics were mixed on the game's unit control; some, like PC PowerPlay, found the indirect system "very easy to control and actually quite relaxing", while others considered that the game did not provide sufficient information in the user interface and game manual, nor options to sufficiently control unit behavior. GameSpot wrote that the game "does cry out for explanation", stating that its design was complex, its documentation was inscrutable, and the game overall had a high learning curve. Some also lamented the lack of upgrades or resource types, and that the fixed placement of buildings and units to certain areas reduced the depth of battles on the map. The unit artificial intelligence received mixed views: PC PowerPlay found it strong, and Boot found it frustrating.

Following release, PC Gamer considered that The Tone Rebellion was "truly imaginative" and one of a few real-time strategy titles that did not imitate Command & Conquer, following a large number of similar games announced following the latter's release. In a retrospective review, Video Game History Foundation Director Phil Salvador found the game both "evocative and confusing", enjoying its uniqueness and "purposely vague mythos", but feeling its execution was "half-formed" and that some of its many ideas do not "work, connect, or even make sense" together.
