= GlyphX =

Defunct US based CGI studio

GlyphX Inc.
- Type: Incorporation
- Industry: Computer graphics, video games
- Headquarters: United States
- Products: Advent Rising (2005)
- Subsidiaries: GlyphX Games, LLC
- Website: glyphx.com

GlyphX Inc. was a computer graphics designer studio that produced promotional videos, cinematics and artwork for various video games for several years before going into video game design. The third-person shooter Advent Rising, the first and only video game created by GlyphX Games, LLC, the game designer branch of the company, had been long anticipated by critics and fans of the genre, but turned out to be rather a disappointment for both. GlyphX was acquired by Sandman Studios circa 2006.

== Works ==
=== Illustrations ===
- Diablo II (2000, magazine article illustrations)
- Dinotopia Game Land Activity Center (2001, PC and GBA box covers)
- Drakan: Order of the Flame (1999, PC box cover)
- Gods & Heroes: Rome Rising (2005, E3 banner)
- Hired Guns (1999, E3 banner)
- Legacy of Kain: Soul Reaver (1999, PlayStation box cover)
- Legacy of Kain: Defiance (2003, box cover art)
- Mortal Kombat: Deadly Alliance (2002, advertisement)
- One Must Fall: Battlegrounds (2003, PC box cover)
- Rally Fusion (2002, PS2 box cover)
- Soul Reaver 2 (2001, magazine article illustrations, E3 poster)
- Spider-Man (2000, PlayStation box cover)
- Spider-Man 2: Enter Electro (2001, PlayStation box cover)
- Star Trek: Voyager – Elite Force (2000, magazine article illustrations)
- Tenchu 2: Birth Of The Stealth Assassins (2000, independent artwork)
- Unreal II: The Awakening (2003, PC box cover, advertisement)
- Unreal Tournament 2003 (2002, PC box cover)
- Vigilante 8: Second Offense (1999, PlayStation box covers)

=== Games ===
- Advent Rising (2005)
