= Deathwatch =

Deathwatch, Death Watch, or Death-Watch may refer to:

== Books ==
- Death-Watch, a 1935 novel by John Dickson Carr
- Deathwatch (novel), a 1972 novel by Robb White
- Deathwatch (play), French playwright Jean Genet's earliest play (Haute Surveillance), written in 1947
- Deathwatch, a 1985 play by Nigel Williams
- Deathwatch (comics), a supervillain from the Ghost Rider series of comics

== Film and TV ==
- Deathwatch (1965 film), English language film version of Jean Genet's play, produced by Vic Morrow and Leonard Nimoy
- Death Watch (La Mort en direct), a 1980 Franco-German-British science fiction film shot in Glasgow
- Deathwatch (2002 film), a 2002 war/horror film set during World War I
- "Death-Watch", the twelfth episode of Series C of Blake's 7 first broadcast 24 March 1980
- Death Watch, a Mandalorian sect in the Star Wars expanded universe

== Games ==
- Deathwatch (role-playing game), the third game in the Warhammer 40,000 Roleplay sub-franchise
- Warhammer 40,000: Deathwatch, a 2015 video game
- Ancients 1: Deathwatch, a MS-DOS computer game
- Deathwatch (video game), an unreleased Atari Jaguar game by Data Design Interactive

== See also ==
- Death watch beetle, an insect famed for making a distinctive ticking sound
