= One Must Fall: 2097 =

1994 video game

- Official box art
- Developer: Diversions Entertainment
- Publisher: Epic MegaGames
- Designer: Rob Elam
- Composer: Kenny Chou
- Platform: DOS
- Release: WW: October 10, 1994
- Genre: Fighting
- Modes: Single-player, multiplayer

One Must Fall: 2097 is a fighting video game for all IBM-compatible computers on DOS, programmed by Diversions Entertainment, published by Epic MegaGames and released in October 1994. The game was later patched to include multiplayer support. In February 1999, the game was declared freeware by the developers. A sequel titled One Must Fall: Battlegrounds was released in 2003.

== Gameplay ==
Screenshot showing Crystal (in the blue Jaguar HAR) fighting Jean-Paul (in the red Shadow HAR)

One Must Fall: 2097 replaces the human combatants typical of contemporary fighter video games with large Human Assisted Robots (HAR). These HARs are piloted through a physical and mental link to the human pilots, but this is merely a plot concept and is never shown on-screen.

Eleven HARs and ten selectable pilots are available for play, along with five arenas and four tournaments. The pilots vary in strength, speed and endurance, thus the many HAR/pilot combinations allow for large replay value.

Unlike in most fighting games of its time, the arenas (except one, the Stadium) contain hazards. For instance, one arena features spikes coming out of the darkness that can damage a robot.

The game has two main play modes: One-Player Mode, in which the company that markets the robots, World Aeronautics and Robotics (WAR), is holding a competition among its employees to decide who will be selected to oversee the establishment of the first Earth base on Jupiter's moon, Ganymede. The second mode is Tournament Mode, where HAR battles have become the premier source of entertainment for Earth and the player as a new competitor, must win prize money to improve the machine and ultimately become the World Champion.

Each HAR has three special attacks that can be discovered (except for Shadow and Nova, who both have four), along with a "scrap" and "destruction" move (similar to fatalities in Mortal Kombat) that can earn bonus points and, in some cases, unlock secrets.

Using destruction moves in the tournament mode in the higher difficulty levels sometimes results in the player being challenged by an unranked opponent. Defeating that opponent and using a destruction move on their robot occasionally yields secret components which can be installed on the player's HAR, significantly improving the effectiveness of certain special moves and sometimes adding new ones.

== History ==
=== Development ===
Eva Earlong from Jazz Jackrabbit

Devan Shell from Jazz Jackrabbit

The game began development under the title of simply One Must Fall and the beta demo was released as freeware in May 1993. It featured two human fighters who resembled the karatekas of Karate Champ. The completed version was officially released in October 1994 by Epic MegaGames.

The music was composed by Kenny Chow of the demoscene group Renaissance using Scream Tracker 3.0.

Different versions of the game had varying AI flaws. For example, certain versions had all AI opponents not guarding themselves against the special moves of Shadow and Thorn.

The full retail version includes shareware versions of Radix: Beyond the Void, Tyrian and Jazz Jackrabbit, the last of which is referenced heavily in One Must Fall: 2097.

Epic MegaGames planned to release a 3D sequel to the game by 1996, but cancelled it. A sequel would eventually release in 2003, with One Must Fall: Battlegrounds.

=== Legacy ===
In February 1999, the game was declared freeware by the developers, with allowances for non-commercial redistribution and modification.

In January 2013 a remake project was posted to GitHub, named OpenOMF. Development goals were cross-platform compatibility of the engine and the substitution of the IPX-based network functionality. As of April 2025 the project has declared itself in an alpha state, with all major game-play mechanics implemented.
