= Battle 1917 =

1983 video game

- Developer: Cases Computer Simulations Ltd.
- Publisher: Cases Computer Simulations Ltd.
- Platforms: BBC Micro, ZX Spectrum
- Release: 1983

Battle 1917 is a 1983 video game published by Cases Computer Simulations Ltd.

== Gameplay ==
Battle 1917 is a game in which players oppose each other using armies, and will need to kill the other player's king to defeat the opponent.

== Reception ==
Russell Clarke reviewed Battle 1917 for White Dwarf #54, and stated that "Perhaps because every victory is viewed equally with no opportunity for personal betterment. Its claim to be the machine age's answer to Chess can safely be ignored. Good value though!"
