= The Prince (1984 game) =

1984 video game

- Publisher: Cases Computer Simulations
- Platform: ZX Spectrum
- Release: 1984
- Genre: Adventure/Strategy

The Prince is a multiplayer strategy, adventure game with social deduction elements released for the ZX Spectrum 48K in 1984 by Cases Computer Simulations.

== Premise ==
The game is inspired by Niccolò Machiavelli's treatise "The Prince".

Set within the medieval Castle Ravenscrag, the game sets players upon a quest for political ascendancy following the mysterious disappearance of the Lore Master, a position of significant influence second only to the Prince.

The game requires four players. They assume the roles of different court figures, choosing from four distinct character classes: landowner, cleric, merchant, or court official. Each class possesses unique abilities and weaknesses. The objective present correct tokens — an object and a word — to The Prince to secure appointment as the new Lore Master.

== Gameplay ==
Gameplay is similar to traditional text-based adventure games but incorporates multiplayer and strategic elements. Players navigate the castle, interacting with a cast of 17 non-player characters. The game's parser uses a restricted set of commands common to all players and some character-specific commands. Inputs are limited to ten per turn.

Available actions include exploring environments, examining and acquiring objects, engaging in conversations, and performing activities such as blackmail, buying, selling, and haggling. Players can also hire thugs and spies, and purchase items from a NPC merchant. Some servants may be double agents, adding a layer of intrigue and potential betrayal.

Each player can also use their character special ability.

- Grasper (Landowner) can provide protection to himself and others, making them immune to physical attacks and theft.
- Ambrose (Cleric) can absolve players of their wrongdoings, restoring their grace.
- Porcus (Merchant) can lend money to players in increments of 1,000 crowns, facilitating the purchase of items and services.
- Fernando (Tipstaff) can initiate trials against other players for crimes like theft or assault, potentially leading to their imprisonment.

Players accumulate sins through actions like theft, deception, or ordering attacks on others. Accumulating excessive sins results in the Prince refusing an audience. Therefore, players must carefully balance their Machiavellian tactics with opportunities to atone, such as seeking grace from Brother Ambrose (cleric).

Gameplay is turn-based, with only one player active at a time while others await their turns. Each player is provided with a personal passcode to maintain the secrecy of their actions and strategies.

The social dynamic is a core aspect of gameplay. While direct interaction between players during turns is limited, the game allows for off-screen negotiations and alliances, adding a layer of intrigue and deception. The consequences of players' secret actions become apparent as the game progresses, often impacting rivals in unexpected ways. Certain game conditions can lead to players being declared "incommunicado," restrict their ability to communicate with others, both within and outside the game, adding a layer of strategic isolation.

== Reception ==
Reception

Review score
Publication	Score
Personal Computer Games	7/10

The Prince received mixed reviews from contemporary gaming magazines. Critics particularly praised its innovative multiplayer approach and complex gameplay mechanics, with Personal Computer Games highlighting its appeal to players who enjoy collaborative gaming experiences similar to Dungeons & Dragons. The game was noted for providing extensive opportunities for inter-player negotiations and strategic deception, with Crash magazine comparing it to the board game Diplomacy.

However, reviewers identified several significant limitations. The requirement for exactly four players was considered restrictive by Computer and Video Games, while Micro Adventurer criticized the minimal in-game player interaction due to single-keyboard constraints, suggesting the game would have been better suited for networked play. Critics also noted the game's complexity could be challenging, with Crash magazine pointing out that the command structure might only be accessible to experienced adventure game players.

Despite these drawbacks, reviews highlighted the game's contributions to collaborative gameplay. Personal Computer Games reviewer claimed it was one of the first games to allow "intelligent and enjoyable collaboration between human players". Micro Adventurer praised the game as a forerunner of future network adventure games. Crash called it "a real step forward in computer games".
