= Nightlong: Union City Conspiracy =

1998 video game

- Developers: Trecision / Team17; ClickBOOM (Amiga)
- Publishers: EU: MicroProse; NA: DreamCatcher Interactive; PLX Computers (Amiga)
- Designer: Edoardo Gervino
- Writer: Simone Scelsa
- Composer: Gianluca Verrengia
- Platforms: Microsoft Windows, Amiga
- Release: Microsoft Windows: EU: 1998; NA: October 5, 1999; Amiga: NA: 2000
- Genre: Adventure
- Mode: Single-player

Nightlong: Union City Conspiracy is a cyberpunk-themed adventure game developed by Trecision and Team17 and published by MicroProse in Europe and DreamCatcher Interactive in North America. It was later ported to the Amiga by ClickBOOM.

== Premise ==
The game takes place in the futuristic Union City in the year 2099. The player assumes the role of an investigator named Joshua Reev. His long-time friend, Hugh Martens (who is now in charge of the city), summons him to help with a matter of major political importance. It seems that a group of terrorists are threatening the city, and Martens' reporter friend Simon Ruby (who was investigating) has vanished. Martens has called on Reev to investigate.

== Gameplay ==
Nightlong is a point-and-click adventure game, predominantly focusing on inventory management and puzzle-solving.

The game is played mostly from the third-person perspective showing Joshua Reev and his surrounding area. As with many games of the genre, non-playable characters appear in some areas and can be interacted with. The navigation interface uses left-click to examine an object, right-click to use, interact with, or combine objects in the game or in Josh's inventory. Hotspots are indicated with on-screen text, including area exits. They are labelled as "Go to..." if Josh has yet to explore the area.

Background music and sound effects are unobtrusive. There is little dialogue between characters, although the game itself is narrated by Josh as he interacts with the items, areas and characters. If Josh has nothing to say, he will shrug. Strong language infrequently appears in Josh's narration.

The game has backgrounds that appear to be a mixture of texture-mapped and hand-drawn graphics. An inventory bar is accessible at the bottom of the screen, and the Escape key is used for the control menu.

== Reception ==
Reception

Review scores
Publication	Score
Computer Games Magazine	2.5/5
PC Gamer (UK)	46%
PC Zone	43/100
PC Gaming World	8/10

The game received mainly mixed reviews, with reviewers praising the graphics and sound while criticising the plot and complexity of some of the puzzles. The game sold well enough to warrant the later Amiga conversion and a patch release allowing it to be played on Windows XP.

Due to its science fiction setting, Nightlong received an overt recommendation from The Sci-Fi Channel (now SyFy), to the point of Sci-Fi's logo being present on the box art. Along with MechCommander, it was one of the few games to ever be officially recommended by Sci-Fi.

== See also ==
- Hollywood Monsters
- Tony Tough and the Night of Roasted Moths
