= Profezia =

1991 video game

- Cover art
- Developer(s): Trecision
- Publisher(s): Genias
- Designer(s): Patrizia Alvigini
- Platform(s): Amiga, MS-DOS
- Release: February 1991
- Genre(s): Adventure

Profezia (Italian for "prophecy") is a 1991 adventure video game with a multiple-choice interface: as opposed to classic adventures where the player is free to roam around the game world (or part of it), the storyline in Profezia develops automatically. Whenever an action is to be taken, the player is presented with a set of choices, which will affect the rest of the adventure.

Profezia is set in the Middle Ages, in a mountain area between the two Italian regions of Abruzzo and Lazio. The player takes control of a mercenary who has been hired to retrieve a golden crown from the castle of Capistrello, where Duke Attilio intends to use it on an ancient Pagan rite.

There is no unique path to complete the game: the player may follow alternate branches, provided that the actions which follow are coherent with their previous choices.
