= United (video game) =

1984 video game

- Publisher: Cases Computer Simulations Ltd
- Release: 1984

United is a 1984 video game published by Cases Computer Simulations Ltd.

== Gameplay ==
United is a game in which the player manages and builds a fourth division football team, get them to win the league Championship.

== Reception ==
Luke Renouf reviewed United for Imagine magazine, and stated that "it's a good and fairly difficult game which has an addictive quality that will keep you coming back for more."
