= Syyrah: The Warp Hunter =

1997 video game

- Developer: Pixelstorm
- Publisher: Sun Corporation
- Platform: Windows
- Release: 1997
- Modes: Single-player, multiplayer

Syyrah: The Warp Hunter is a 1997 video game developed by Pixelstorm and published by Sun Corporation for Microsoft Windows. It is a shoot 'em up game in which players shoot at mines surrounding a spaceship. Syyrah received positive reviews upon release.

== Gameplay ==
The objective of Syyrah is to destroy a fixed number of multicoloured mines encircling the player before they reach the player's ship in the centre of the screen. Players shoot mines of six different colours, which destroy in clusters when paired in groups of three or more. Power-ups can be acquired with positive and negative effects. Each mine destroyed earns points, which multiply by the number of mines cleared in a cluster. Syyrah features a Scenario Mode including 24 levels of play, and a two-player multiplayer mode.

== Plot ==
The peaceful people of Ryys, who have lived peacefully on the planet Keeron in the Heyanu system for millennia, are invaded by the Zarven. To facilitate the invasion, the Zarven send thousands of "cybernominals" through a wormhole to destroy all life on the planet. Only Syyrah, the surviving member of a clan of warriors willing to sacrifice their life for the freedom of the Ryys.

== Development and release ==
Syrrah was developed by Pixelstorm and published by Sunsoft, who showcased the game at the 1997 European Computer Trade Show. The game was slated for release in September 1997. A Nintendo 64 version of the game was planned for release in 1998.

== Critical reception ==
Reception

Review scores
Publication	Score
Micromanía	56%
PC Games (DE)	44%
The Games Machine (Italy)	82%
576 KByte	85%
Game Over	64%
Gry Komputerowe	78%
PC Action	55%
PC Joker	36%
PC Player	4/5
PC Top Player	78%

Syyrah received generally favourable reviews upon release.
