= One Must Fall: Battlegrounds =

2003 video game

- Developer(s): Diversions Entertainment
- Publisher(s): Diversions Publishing; Tri Synergy; GMX Media; Manaccom
- Platform(s): Microsoft Windows
- Release: NA: 19 December 2003; PAL: 19 January 2004
- Genre(s): Fighting
- Mode(s): Single-player, multiplayer

One Must Fall: Battlegrounds is a fighting game for Microsoft Windows. Developed by American studio Diversions Entertainment and co-published in December 2003 by Diversions Publishing and Trisynergy Inc. following nearly 7 years of development, One Must Fall: Battlegrounds brought the One Must Fall series into a second installment released in an age where the gaming world expected graphics and gameplay in three dimensions with internet gameplay as an integral portion of the offering.

== Background ==
Battlegrounds started development as a sequel to the popular shareware title One Must Fall: 2097, playing in a side-scrolling manner with two opponents facing each other. At the time, Rob Elam saw the opportunity in the Unreal Engine then in development by 2097 publisher Epic MegaGames. At the time, Epic was not yet at a point where they were willing to examine licensing the engine or developing the Unreal Engine for third-party use and so a joint decision was reached whereby Rob Elam left to develop a new game engine. Kenny Chou (composer of 2097) did not return in this installment because at this point Diversions Entertainment had Saul Bottcher as their own in-house composer.

== Reception ==
Reception

Aggregate score
Aggregator	Score
Metacritic	61/100

Review scores
Publication	Score
Computer Games Magazine	2/5 stars
Computer Gaming World	2/5 stars
Game Informer	8/10
GameRevolution	D+
GameSpot	7.1/10
GameSpy	2/5 stars
GameZone	7.5/10
IGN	6.7/10
PC Gamer (US)	58%
X-Play	2/5 stars

The game received "mixed" reviews according to the review aggregation website Metacritic.

Jeff Gerstmann of GameSpot noted that the game lacked polish from start to finish, and had much higher system requirements than advertised to achieve a decent frame rate, and even then slow down is noticeable when increasing the resolution. Audio effects were labelled generic and the music was said to sound like it was taken from the Amiga demo scene.
