= The Watchmaker (video game) =

2001 video game

- Developer: Trecision
- Publisher: Got Game Entertainment
- Platform: Windows
- Release: 2001 (Europe); June 1, 2002 (US)
- Genre: Adventure

The Watchmaker is a Windows adventure video game developed by Trecision and published by Got Game Entertainment in Europe in 2001 and in North America on June 1, 2002.

== Plot ==
Darrel Boone gets a call from Scotland Yard at 4am. They have an offer to him. He has to investigate the dangerous people that can potentially destroy the whole world and are connected with Internationals company. One of the higher-ups of Internationals resides in an Austrian castle. Darrel normally works alone, but this time he will need help of Victoria Conroy. They both fly to Austria immediately. They get familiar with the gardener Raul, cook, Internationals manager, his wife Julia Roberts, maid Carla and others. They investigate the various rooms, towers, the church, gardens, kitchen etc.

== Development ==
The game was announced in August 2000. According to Trecision, The Watchmaker was in production for over 3 years. It was originally developed under the working title WM. The game struggled to find a North American distributor, but was ultimately signed by Got Game Entertainment in early 2002, which released it that June.

== Reception ==
Reception

Review scores
| Publication | Score |
|---|---|
| Adventure Gamers | 3/5 |
| Computer Games Magazine | 2/5 |
| GameSpot | 6.9/10 |
| The Electric Playground | 5/10 |
| Just Adventure | C+ |

The Watchmaker received "mixed or average reviews" from critics, according to Metacritic.

Charles Herold of The New York Times presented The Watchmaker with a negative review. He wrote, "The graphics are poor, the interface is unwieldy, the puzzles are tedious and the characters' voices are so inferior that one suspects they were recorded by the company's programmers and secretaries." John Brandon of Computer Games Magazine concurred, writing that "The Watchmaker is stuck in the dark ages of computer gaming".

The Watchmaker was a nominee for The Electric Playground's 2002 "Best Adventure Game for PC" award, but lost to Syberia and Silent Hill 2 (tie).
