= The Ancient Art of War in the Skies =

1992 video game

- Developer: Evryware
- Publisher: MicroProse
- Designers: Joe Gargiulo; Barry Murry; Dave Murry; Dee Dee Murry
- Composers: Jeff Briggs; Roland J. Rizzo
- Platforms: MS-DOS, Amiga, Atari ST
- Release: 1992: MS-DOS; 1993: Amiga, ST
- Genre: Combat flight simulator
- Mode: Single-player

The Ancient Art of War in the Skies is a video game developed by Evryware in 1992 for MS-DOS as a sequel to The Ancient Art of War and The Ancient Art of War at Sea. In 1993 conversions were published for Amiga and Atari ST.

== Gameplay ==
The Ancient Art of War in the Skies is a game of air combat simulation in which the player controls the aircraft of either the British or German army in World War I against opponents such as Lord Kitchener, Ferdinand Foch, Kaiser Wilhelm II, fictional enemy Helmut von Spike, or even Sun Tzu.

The game acts in two dimensions. In the first one the player spends most of its time on the overhead map. They can plan the strategy and set the goals and routes for aircraft. In the second one, when the aircraft reaches its destination, the game switches to an arcade section. There are also two: a side-scrolling dog fights where the goal is to destroy the enemy aircraft shooting at them and overhead bombings where the player has to release bombs at the marked targets. Arcade sequences can be skipped and dealt by computer's calculations based on different variables.

== Reception ==
The game was reviewed in 1993 in Dragon #190 by Hartley, Patricia, and Kirk Lesser in "The Role of Computers" column. The reviewers gave the game 3 out of 5 stars. Computer Gaming World called it "a cute combination of strategy and action gaming" that would not likely appeal to fans of flight simulators or wargames. A 1993 survey in the magazine of wargames gave the game three-plus stars out of five.

ST Format's Rob Mead wrote: "At last, a war simulation which you don't need a degree in Advanced Physics to play. Ancient Arts is an original and addictive approach to a genre which is all to often bogged down in tedious manouvering and unnecessary attention to detail".
