= Monuments of Mars =

1991 video game

- Episode 2, level 4
- Developer: Scenario Software
- Publisher: Apogee Software
- Designer: Todd Replogle
- Programmer: Todd Replogle
- Artist: Todd Replogle
- Engine: FAST
- Platform: MS-DOS
- Release: 1991
- Genre: Puzzle-platform
- Mode: Single-player

Monuments of Mars is a third-person puzzle-platform game developed by Scenario Software for MS-DOS and compatible systems. It was published by Apogee Software. The game consists of four 20-level episodes, the first episode being shareware, the rest being commercial software. It is similar to the games Arctic Adventure and Pharaoh's Tomb (developed by George Broussard and also published by Apogee) but uses an unrelated engine.

The game was discontinued, and was released as freeware on March 20, 2009. It was re-released in 2015 on Steam with support for Windows and macOS.

== Plot ==
The player is tasked with rescuing NASA astronauts that have gone missing in the fictional "monuments of Mars". Toward the end of each episode, groups of captured astronauts can be released from "energy rings". At the end of the final episode, markings on a "face" object reveal that some aliens were using Mars as a base to study humans from afar, but abandoned it and left their automatic intruder capture system switched on, hence the capture of the astronauts.

== Gameplay ==
The player controls an astronaut who must navigate through twenty levels on the planet Mars to finish the game. Most levels require the player to enter a door to advance to the next level, but earlier levels have the player simply move to the opposite side of the screen. The player has the capability to jump and shoot with a gun. This is useful to operate switches which open doors or turn off obstacles. A unique point to this game is that the player has no limit of lives. A player may restart a level as many times as necessary. If a player can collect the letters in the word "MARS" scattered throughout the level in order, a large bonus is added to the player's score.

The game advertises cheat sheets available on registration. The game's save files are quite simple: mars1.sv1 through mars4.sv1 each contain two bytes, representing the number of completed levels and the number of remaining shots, and mars1.sv2 through mars4.sv2 contain the current score as an ASCII integer. A cheating player can therefore set these values to anything they like before restoring a saved game.
