= Trecision =

Italian video game developer

Trecision S.p.A.
- Company type: Private
- Industry: Video games
- Founded: 1991
- Founder: Pietro Montelatici; Fabrizio Lagorio; Edoardo Gervino
- Defunct: 2003
- Fate: Bankruptcy and liquidation
- Headquarters: Rapallo, Genoa, Italy
- Products: Profezia, Nightlong: Union City Conspiracy

Trecision S.p.A. was an Italian video game developer founded in 1991 by Pietro Montelatici, Fabrizio Lagorio and Edoardo Gervino. The company's headquarters was in Rapallo (province of Genoa).

Their first game was Profezia developed for Amiga and PC, followed by a number of titles for different platforms (Amiga, MS-DOS, PC, PlayStation, PlayStation 2, and mobile phones). Via a publishing agreement with English company ICE, they developed two adventure games, Alien Virus and Ark of Time but, unhappy with the economic treatment, they decided to switch publisher for Nightlong: Union City Conspiracy, releasing it with Team 17. The adventure was originally designed to be a sequel to Alien Virus, then Trecision modified it with a different cyberpunk theme. This caused a few issues with ICE since, apparently, they worked on the original concept of the game and thought they owned the license to publish it.

In March 2000, Trecision acquired fellow Italian game developer Pixelstorm Games and MotherBrain Entertainment becoming the largest game developer in Italy.

Trecision was working on two games for Cryo Interactive when that company declared bankruptcy in 2002. Consequently, Trecision filed for voluntary liquidation in mid-2003. Trecision accredited Cryo's closure with its own bankruptcy.

== List of Trecision games ==
=== Developed titles ===
#	Title	Release year	Platform(s)	Notes
1	Profezia	1991	Amiga, MS-DOS	
2	Extasy	1992	Amiga	Game published by the Italian company Simulmondo.
3	In the Dead of Night	1994	Amiga, MS-DOS	
4	Alien Virus	1995	MS-DOS, PC	
5	Spring Time	1995	Amiga	
6	Ark of Time	1997	MS-DOS, PC, PlayStation	
7	Syyrah: The Warp Hunter	1997	MS-DOS, PC	Game developed by Pixelstorm.
8	Nightlong: Union City Conspiracy	1998	Amiga, PC	Game co-developed with Team17.
9	Puma Street Soccer	1999	PC, PlayStation	Game developed by Pixelstorm.
10	Chris Kamara's Street Soccer	2000	PlayStation	Game developed by Pixelstorm.
11	The Watchmaker	2001	PC	
12	Calcio Championship	2002	PC	
13	Elf Tales	2003	Mobile phones	
14	Football Generation	2003	PC, PlayStation 2	The PlayStation 2 version of the game was released in 2006.
15	Grande Fratello: Il Gioco	2003	Mobile phones, PC, PlayStation	Game released only in Italy. Based on Grande Fratello, the Italian version of Big Brother, aired from 2000 on Canale 5.
16	Hiro's Legend	2003	Mobile phones	
17	Spy Girl: Danger with Diamonds	2003	Mobile phones	
18	Spy Girl: Missing Masters	2003	Mobile phones	
19	Nicky Strange: Jungle Daze	Unknown	Mobile phones	
20	Nicky Strange: Temple of Destiny	Unknown	Mobile phones	

=== Cancelled titles ===
- Popeye: Hush Rush for Spinach (PlayStation 2)
- Scooty Racers (PlayStation 2, and Xbox)
- Zidane Football Generation (PlayStation 2)
- Samhain (PC)
