= Encyclopedia of War: Ancient Battles =

1988 video game

- Publisher: Cases Computer Simulations
- Platforms: Amiga, Amstrad CPC, MS-DOS, ZX Spectrum
- Release: 1988
- Genre: Turn-based strategy

Encyclopedia of War: Ancient Battles is a turn-based strategy video game published in 1988 by Cases Computer Simulations.

== Gameplay ==
Ancient Battles is a game in which each of the most notable ancient armies and types of weapons are represented.

== Reception ==
Lt. H. E. Dille reviewed the game for Computer Gaming World, and stated that "Ancient Battles is an enjoyable game that will continue to challenge players long after other games have started to gather dust on the shelf. The subject matter is a refreshing change of pace for experienced wargamers, but remains basic enough for budding enthusiasts to master."
