= The Ancient Art of War =

1984 video game

- Developer: Evryware
- Publisher: Broderbund
- Designers: Dave Murry; Barry Murry
- Platforms: Amiga, Amstrad CPC, Apple IIe, Atari ST, MS-DOS, Mac, PC-88, PC-98
- Release: December 1984; Apple II, MS-DOS; 1987; Mac
- Genre: Strategy
- Mode: Single-player

The Ancient Art of War is a computer wargame designed by Dave and Barry Murry of Evryware and published by Broderbund in 1984. It is one of the first real-time strategy or real-time tactics games.

== Gameplay ==
A battlefield simulation, the game's title comes from the classic strategy text The Art of War written by Sun Tzu around 400 B.C.

The objective of the game is to win a series of battles using four types of troops: Knights, Archers, Barbarians, and Spies. All four types are unmounted.

It uses a rock paper scissors type of unit balance typical of the genre. Knights beat barbarians in melee; barbarians have the advantage over archers; and archers have the advantage over knights, in addition to being effective at defending against attempts to storm a fort. Spies do not fight, but they can see enemy units twice as far away as anyone else and are the fastest-moving units in the game.

At the start of the game, the player is able to select from a list of eleven campaigns to play. The campaigns include both skirmishes and capture the flags style missions, while the terrain layout and initial starting units provided a variety of strategic options for game play. Advanced rule sets such as Training New Units and Supply Line Lengths allow for more customization. The player can also select from among several AI opponents represented by various historical figures such as Geronimo and Sun Tzu himself. Sun Tzu represents the most difficult level. These settings affected both AI behavior, as well as certain properties such as the speed at which enemy units moved through difficult terrain.

The game does not feature any economy management element (mining, gathering or construction), a common feature of later real-time strategy games.

=== Tactics ===
Each mission takes place on a map containing forts, towns, terrain features (bridges, mountains, forests, etc.), and squads. Squads can consist of up to 14 units, made up of any combination of the four unit types. A squad moves at the speed of its slowest unit (Barbarians are faster than Archers, which are faster than Knights), so a squad of all Barbarians would move faster than a mixed squad.

Squads that lose units have to make do until another squad can be merged with them. In many campaigns, squads with less than 14 units can receive random reinforcements by waiting at a fort.

When two enemy squads meet on the battlefield, they are frozen in an encounter while time continues to pass. If they are left by themselves, then, after a delay, the computer will automatically determine the outcome of the battle. Alternately, the player can choose to "Zoom" into the battle to resolve it immediately, gaining limited command of the soldiers in battle. It may be advantageous to leave squads in an encounter while others squads run past the enemy squad so engaged. Formations can be chosen to take advantage of a squad's particular makeup. For example, all of a squad's Archers can be placed in the rear while the Barbarians form a line in the front. The game supported per-type orders during battle, so one could alternately place archers upfront with a gap; put knights within the gap; order the archers to fire while the knights hold; then order the archers to fall back while the knights attacked. One could not order individual soldiers, however.

Formations only affected the tactical battles; only whole squads were ever represented on the strategic map, not individual soldiers.

A number of factors influence the outcome of a battle and elevate the game beyond a simple rock-paper-scissors strategy. Hunger, distance, terrain, and morale all affect the squads' effectiveness. Care has to be taken when marching troops full speed, or across a series of mountains, to prevent them from arriving at a battle too fatigued to fight. In addition, even the winning side in a battle suffers a slight reduction in the squad's readiness. Troops in a poor condition fight poorly, might retreat without being ordered to do so, and could even potentially surrender outright if significantly outnumbered. Hunger is modeled through an abstract 'supply' value per squad; villages and/or forts slowly replenish the supplies of nearby friendly squads. A squad that runs out of supplies diminishes in vigor and might be destroyed by what would otherwise be an inferior force.

One of the limitations of the game engine was that it could only display a certain number of units total at any time. This led some players to force the computer into having fewer (though stronger) units and thus easier to evade by creating an army of weak units.

=== Editing ===
The game allows players to create their own maps, formations, and missions.

The map editor provides a fixed palette of identically sized tiles with a variety of terrain features, with which one can fill in the details on a fixed-size rectangular map. The severity of certain terrain features, such as whether moving through mountains is merely slow or potentially deadly, is controlled at game time with options, not via a property of the map.

The formation editor allows the player to configure templates for arranging squads according to the three combat troop types; there are a fixed number of slots for formations, which can then be chosen in-game.

The campaign editor controls the positioning and composition of squads on both sides, their initial condition and supply levels, the location of flags, the default opponent, and the mission briefing, including settings such as how treacherous the terrain is. Flags and squads must belong to one side or the other, as during the game. The flags positions can be randomized; if either side does not have at least one flag assigned to them in a specific location, they receive a single randomly located flag when the mission was played. This location changes every time the mission is restarted.

== Development ==
The Ancient Art of War was designed by Dave and Barry Murry. It was originally released in December 1984 for MS-DOS and Apple II, and was made available for Macintosh in 1987.

== Reception ==
In 1985 Computer Gaming World praised The Ancient Art of War as a great war game, especially the ability to create custom scenarios, stating that for pre-gunpowder warfare it "should allow you to recreate most engagements". In 1987 it stated that the game and its sequel "are excellent war games and provide many hours of high grade entertainment". In 1990 the magazine gave the game three out of five stars, and in 1993 two stars. Jerry Pournelle of BYTE named The Ancient Art of War his game of the month for February and March 1986, reporting that his sons "say (and I confirm from my own experience) is about the best strategic computer war game they've encountered ... Highly recommended". PC Magazine in 1988 called the game "educational and entertaining".

Lisa Stevens reviewed the Macintosh version The Ancient Art of War in White Wolf #28 (Aug./Sept., 1991), rating it a 5 out of 5 and stated that "In summary, The Ancient Art of War is a wargame that even a nonwargamer can't help but like. It provides enough strategy to make it challenging, but enough great graphics to make it exciting. All in all, a great software package."

Macworld inducted the Macintosh version of The Ancient Art of War into the 1986 Macworld Game Hall of Fame in the Best Strategy Game category, ahead of runner-up Balance of Power. Macworld praised the game's clear graphics that made complex movements comprehensible, the movie-style combat scenes, the quality packaging, and the editing tools.

== Legacy ==
The Ancient Art of War is generally regarded as one of the earliest real-time strategy (RTS) or real-time tactics games. The genre became significantly more popular in the 1990s with games such as Dune II (1992) and Warcraft: Orcs & Humans (1994). Unlike many later RTS games, The Ancient Art of War focused primarily on military strategy and tactics rather than economic management, resource gathering, construction, and base development.

The game's influence on later strategy designers has also been acknowledged by developers. Ian Fischer, lead designer of Age of Empires II and Age of Mythology, identified The Ancient Art of War as the first true RTS, disagreeing with the view that Herzog Zwei held that distinction. Chaos Seed designer Junichi Kashiwagi also identified The Ancient Art of War as one of the earlier strategy games that preceded Herzog Zwei, although he regarded Herzog Zwei as the more direct influence on the strategy mechanics of Chaos Seed.

The game is also noted for its use of a rock-paper-scissors system to balance its three principal combat units: archers, knights, and barbarians. The system gives each unit a tactical advantage over one of the other units, encouraging players to consider unit composition and battlefield conditions when engaging the enemy.

In 2009, GameSpy ranked The Ancient Art of War number 10 on its list of the greatest PC games of the 1980s.

The Ancient Art of War was followed by two sequels. The Ancient Art of War at Sea was released in 1987 and adapted the series' gameplay to naval warfare, while The Ancient Art of War in the Skies was released in 1992 and focused on World War I aerial warfare.
