= PC Player =

PC Player may refer to:

- PC Player (British magazine), a British computing magazine
- PC Player (German magazine), a German computing magazine
