= Pharaoh's Tomb =

1990 video game

- Screenshot of Level 1
- Developer: Micro F/X Software
- Publishers: Lone Star Micro (Pursuit); Apogee Software (Tomb)
- Designer: George Broussard
- Engine: FAST
- Platform: MS-DOS
- Release: July 15, 1990 (Tomb); November 8, 1990 (Pursuit)
- Genre: Platform
- Mode: Single-player

Pharaoh's Tomb is an MS-DOS platform game created by George Broussard (misspelled as "Broussad") and published by Apogee Software.

The game uses CGA graphics based on the FAST (Fluid Animation Software Technology) engine. Notoriously, objects' positions are determined by their bounding volumes, not their pixel-precise positions on screen.

The game was re-released in 2015 on Steam with support for Windows and macOS.

== Plot ==
The protagonist, Nevada Smith (a play on Indiana Jones), is an archaeologist and adventurer who is exploring an Egyptian pyramid, hoping to find the Pharaoh's Tomb and get evidence of his findings.

== Gameplay ==
In each level, the player navigates and avoids obstacles by jumping or falling, evading or killing enemies, and find keys to exit each level. Nevada Smith has no life bar, and is killed instantly when he touches enemies or traps. Nevada Smith can collect coins and idols for extra points. Lethal obstacles include pyramid-themed traps, such as blocks that fire projectiles when Smith passes in front of them, wall spikes, ceiling spikes, floor spikes, moving spikes, and wind. Navigational challenges include moving platforms and elevators. Bonus points are randomly concealed in some bricks, which are awarded when hit from below. Occasionally, Smith will become invisible, where only his hat will be visible. The game contains many dead ends as 'traps' where Smith can become permanently stuck, forcing the player to either quit or reload a saved game. Collecting manuscripts will cause blocks to appear (though they occasionally trap the player), and invisible triggers will cause blocks to disappear (usually activated around idols). Collecting an 'F' will temporarily freeze all enemies and hazards. Collecting 5 idols earns the player 50,000 points and collecting 100 coins earns the player an extra life.

== Release ==
Pharaoh's Tomb is a four-episode game, with the first episode being released as shareware. Each episode contains 20 levels, and each level consisting of a single room. The episodes are:

- "Raiders of the Lost Tomb" (a reference to Raiders of the Lost Ark)
- "Pharaoh's Curse"
- "Temple of Terror"
- "Nevada's Revenge"

The game was later released as an 80-level commercial game called Pharaoh's Pursuit published by Lone Star Micro. The game was discontinued on March 2, 2000, and was released as freeware on March 20, 2009.

A sequel, Arctic Adventure, based on the same engine, features Nevada Smith as the protagonist and has similar gameplay.

== Reception ==
Computer Gaming World called Pharaoh's Tomb "lively and imaginative", praising the FAST engine's animation and level design. The magazine said that the low price of the full game made it an "outstanding value".

== See also ==
- Monuments of Mars – a similar game, also published by Apogee but developed separately by Todd Replogle
