= Amulets & Armor =

1997 video game

- Developer: United Software Artists
- Publisher: United Software Artists
- Designers: Janus Anderson; David Webster; Eric Webster
- Programmer: Lysle Shields
- Platform: MS-DOS
- Release: 1997
- Genres: Action, role-playing
- Modes: Single-player, multiplayer

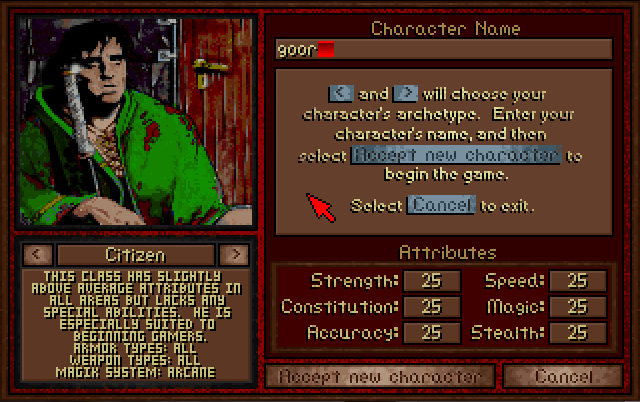
Character creation screen

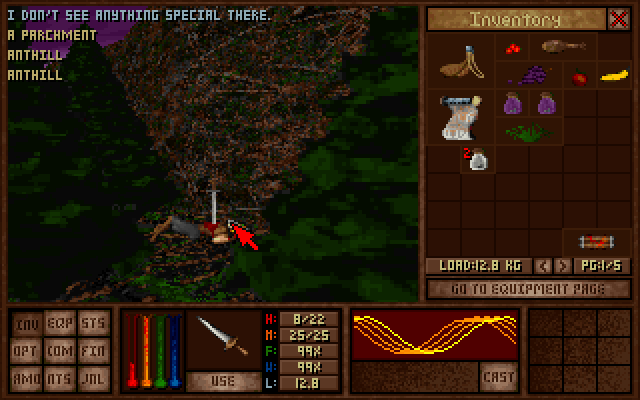
In-game screenshot

Amulets & Armor is a first-person role-playing video game for IBM PC compatibles created by David Webster and Eric Webster and United Software Artists and published as shareware in 1997. In 2013, the game was re-released as Freeware and open-source software.

== Gameplay ==
The game is divided up into quests composed of multiple separate levels which are each against different foes in alternate areas with varying end goals. The player chooses between eleven default characters: Knight, Paladin, Rogue, Mercenary, Sailor, Magician, Priest, Citizen, Mage, Warlock, and Archer. According to the promotion, the game is overall set, "In the underground catacombs of the castle Arius", but only a few levels actually are.

== History ==
=== Development and release ===
United Software Artists developed for Amulets & Armor their own Doom-like 2.5D game engine. The targeted platform was the PC with MS-DOS, utilizing a 256 color VGA graphics mode and 320x200 resolution.

Beyond the Doom-like capabilities, the game's engine RPG features various character classes, a magic system, character advancement and inventory system, a hunger and thirst mechanic, and a detailed level construction system. The game was somewhat noteworthy for its implementation of features commonly associated with fantasy role-playing games in a first-person shooter engine before this was prevalent (it did not innovate these features). The much more famous Ultima Underworld games implemented similar features a half-decade earlier with comparable VGA/MIDI production values. Although a more suitable comparison is perhaps The Elder Scrolls II: Daggerfall released by Bethesda Softworks the previous year with similar features, which became much more prominent. To put the game's graphic capabilities into perspective, Quake, one of the first fully 3D and textured games, came out the previous year and Quake II came out the same year.

The game was released in 1997 after two years of development as shareware on disc, including a musical score (both CD quality and MIDI versions of the music were available on the disc). A game demo version was also offered.

=== Freeware re-release and open sourcing ===
After being legally unavailable and unsupported for many years, the original developers reacquired the rights to Amulets & Armor around February 2013. Later in 2013, it was re-released as freeware on the game's official site and the source code under GPLv3 on GitHub. Work continues for ports to newer systems (Windows, MacOS), including general bug fixes, and changing the graphic back-end to OpenGL.

== Reception ==
Amulets & Armor was a commercial flop with fewer than 100 units sold, due to the outdated production values, confusing user interface, and inadequate shareware marketing. It remained generally unknown until it was released by abandonware webpages.

Upon the freeware re-release in 2013, Rock, Paper, Shotgun reviewed Amulets & Armor and called it "absurd, ambitious, more than a little clunky" and "get past the initial learning curve and you might find something with legs.".
