= Ark of Time =

1997 video game

- North American PC cover art
- Developer: Trecision
- Publisher: Koei
- Director: Edoardo Gervino
- Programmer: Fabrizio Lagorio
- Artists: Mario Ricco; Tommaso Bennati
- Writers: Stewart Bell; Bryn Isaac; Laura Sicignano
- Composer: Luigi Gaggero
- Platforms: MS-DOS, PlayStation
- Release: MS-DOS: NA: March 21, 1997; EU: 1997; PlayStation: WW: 1998
- Genre: Adventure
- Mode: Single-player

Ark of Time is a 1997 adventure game developed by Italian studio Trecision and published in 1997 for MS-DOS by Koei. A PlayStation version was released in 1998.

== Plot ==
Players control Richard, a newspaper reporter whose search for a missing professor takes him around the world and entangles him in the mystery of the fate of Atlantis.

== Gameplay ==
Ark of Time is a third-person point-and-click adventure game, with mostly inventory based puzzles.

== Reception ==
Giving the game 80/100, Tap-Repeatedly/Four Fat Chicks complimented the game's sly sense of humor. AdventureGamers rated the game 70/100, saying "This is the worst game that I've totally enjoyed." GameSpot gave it 6.3/10, writing that Ark of Time was neither revolutionary or groundbreaking. Quandary gave the game 60/100, writing that the game was part of a rush of titles centering around the fabled lost city of Atlantis that were released at the time. Additionally, Quandary felt that it was surprising. Gameboomers wrote that the game was 'pretty okay'. Just Adventure felt the title was loony and offbeat. MeriStation felt that while the game was competent and didn't have any serious flaws, it lacked anything that pushed the genre.
