= AstroFire =

1994 video game

- Title screen
- Developer: ORT Software
- Publisher: ORT Software
- Platform: MS-DOS
- Release: 1994
- Genre: Multidirectional shooter
- Mode: Single-player

AstroFire is a multidirectional shooter for MS-DOS, published by British studio ORT Software in 1994. The game is a clone of the 1979 Asteroids arcade video game.

== Reception ==
The reviewer for the Polish Świat Gier Komputerowych magazine considered it a very good game, giving it a score of 90%.
