= Advantage Tennis =

1991 video game

- Developer(s): Infogrames
- Publisher(s): Infogrames
- Platform(s): Amiga, Atari ST, MS-DOS
- Release: 1991
- Genre(s): Sports
- Mode(s): Single-player, multiplayer

Advantage Tennis is a 1991 tennis video game developed and published by Infogrames for the Amiga, Atari ST, and MS-DOS.

== Gameplay ==
The game has three modes: training, season, and exhibition. The game is depicted from an over-the-shoulder viewpoint. When creating a character, points can be spent to improve different shot types (backhand, smash, etc.), or decrease points in a shot type to spend them on another shot. In the season mode, the player starts seeded 100 and earns money playing tournaments around the world that can be spent on improving shot types. Before each match, two special abilities can be selected like diving or tweener.

== Reception ==
Reception

Review scores
Publication	Score
Aktueller Software Markt	9/12 (DOS); 8/12 (ST)
Amiga Action	74%
Amiga Power	69%
ST Format	79%
Amiga Mania	87%
CU Amiga	91%

Amiga Action called the game "average" and said Pro Tennis Tour 2 is a better game. Amiga Power liked the graphics but didn't like the "muddy controls". They called the game frustrating and "a tad dull". Aktueller Software Markt called the game fast and extremely playable tennis sim. The ST version was said to be not as fast as the PC version. ST Format and CU Amiga said the game is better than Pro Tennis Tour or International 3D Tennis. Amiga Mania called the game "thoroughly enjoyable".
