= Desert Rats: The North Africa Campaign =

1985 video game

- Publisher: Cases Computer Simulations
- Platforms: Amstrad CPC, ZX Spectrum
- Release: 1985
- Genre: Wargame

Desert Rats: The North Africa Campaign is a 1985 video game published by Cases Computer Simulations.

== Gameplay ==
Desert Rats: The North Africa Campaign is a game in which the North African campaign from World War II in simulated in detail.

== Reception ==
Reception

Awards
Publication	Award
Crash	Crash Smash
Sinclair User	SU Classic

M. Evan Brooks reviewed the game for Computer Gaming World, and stated that "For the more casual gamer, this game offers little. For the gamer intrigued by Rommel and Montgomery (wait a minute, was anyone ever intrigued by Montgomery?), Desert Rats offers the most detailed treatment available." Chris Bourne of Sinclair User gave it the award of SU Classic.
