= Zephyr (video game) =

1994 DOS video game

- Developer: New World Computing
- Publisher: New World Computing
- Producer: Mark Caldwell
- Designers: Jon Van Caneghem; Jonathan P. Gwyn
- Programmers: David Hathaway; Gary B. Smith
- Artist: Jonathan P. Gwyn
- Writer: Milton W. Bland
- Composer: Robert King
- Platforms: MS-DOS, GOG.com, Steam
- Release: MS-DOS; December 1994; GOG.com; December 18, 2020; Steam; February 5, 2021
- Genre: Vehicular combat
- Modes: Single-player, multiplayer

Zephyr is a vehicular combat game developed and published by New World Computing. It was released for MS-DOS in 1994.

== Gameplay ==
Zephyr is a shoot 'em up that takes place in an arena, and comes with network capabilities.

== Development ==
Zephyr was developed by New World Computing. Although co-founders Jon Van Caneghem and Mark Caldwell received top billing in its credits, Caldwell admitted the two were not involved in its day-to-day production as they were more focused on the company's flagship Might and Magic series and its spin-off Heroes of Might and Magic at the time. He claimed they had long desired to do a "driving game" and Zephyr would contain the developer's first true 3D game engine. Caldwell went on to say that the game's title, boxart, and graphics all "rung out with people" to culminate in a project unlike anything they had done before. This was the first New World Computing soundtrack completed by Heroes of Might and Magic composer Rob King.

== Release ==
Zephyr was released for MS-DOS compatible operating systems in December 1994. Despite advertising it, the game did not include multiplayer at launch. Registered consumers had to mail in a card to New World Computing to receive network play at no additional cost. The game's publishing rights were eventually purchased by Ziggurat Interactive, which distributed it digitally on GOG.com on December 18, 2020 and on Steam on February 5, 2021.

== Reception ==
Reception

Review scores
Publication	Score
Computer Game Review	87%
Computer Gaming World	2/5
Hyper	78%
Joystick	35%
Next Generation	3/5
PC Gamer (US)	48%
PC Games (DE)	67%
Coming Soon Magazine	80%
Electronic Games	C
Génération 4	30%
PC Joker	38%
PC Player	38%
Play Time	49%
Power Play	54%
World Village	4/5

Critical reception for Zephyr was mixed. Next Generation reviewed the game, rating it three stars out of five, and stated that "for those net fiends who have the urge to blow away friends over the phone line, there is some good gaming to be played here." Writing for The Seattle Times, Steven L. Kent criticized Zephyr as an example of a mediocre product requiring a Pentium processor and that "programmed properly, this game should run beautifully on a computer with a 486DX processor at 50 megahertz."
