= Unreal Engine =

Video game engine developed by Epic Games

- Logo used since 2023

- Screenshot of Unreal Engine 4.20
- Original author: Tim Sweeney
- Developer: Epic Games
- Stable release: 5.8
- Written in: C++
- Operating system: Windows, Linux, macOS
- License: Source-available commercial software with royalty model for commercial use
- Website: www.unrealengine.com
- Repository: github.com/EpicGames/UnrealEngine

Unreal Engine (UE) is a 3D computer graphics game engine developed by Epic Games, initially made for use in the 1998 first-person shooter video game Unreal. Originally developed for PC first-person shooters, it has since been used in a variety of genres of games and has been adopted by other industries, most notably the film and television industry. Unreal Engine is written in C++ and features a high degree of portability, supporting a wide range of desktop, mobile, console, and virtual reality platforms.

The latest generation, Unreal Engine 5, was launched in April 2022. Its source code is available on GitHub, and commercial use is granted based on a royalty model, with Epic charging 5% of revenues over US$1 million, which is waived for games published exclusively on the Epic Games Store. Epic has incorporated features in the engine from acquired companies such as Quixel.

== History ==
Release timeline
1998	Unreal Engine 1
1999–2000
2001	Unreal Engine 2
2002–2005
2006	Unreal Engine 3
2007–2013
2014	Unreal Engine 4
2015–2021
2022	Unreal Engine 5
TBA	Unreal Engine 6

=== First generation ===
Unreal Engine 1 was initially developed in 1995 by Epic Games founder Tim Sweeney for Unreal and used either software rendering or hardware rendering via support for various early 3D accelerators like the 3DFX Voodoo Graphics via the 3DFX Glide API. It supported Windows, Linux, Mac and Unix. Epic later began to license the Engine to other game studios.

=== Unreal Engine 2 ===
Unreal Engine 2 transitioned the engine from software rendering to hardware rendering and brought support for the PlayStation 2, Xbox, and GameCube consoles. The first game using UE2 was released in 2002 and its last update was shipped in 2005.

=== Unreal Engine 3 ===
Unreal Engine 3 was one of the first game engines to support multithreading. It used DirectX 9 as its baseline graphics API, simplifying its rendering code. The first games using UE3 were released at the end of 2006.

=== Unreal Engine 4 ===
Deformation physics in Unreal Engine 4

Unreal Engine 4 brought support for physically based materials and the "Blueprints" visual scripting system. The first game using UE4 was released in April 2014. It was the first version of Unreal to be free to download with royalty payments on game revenue.

=== Unreal Engine 5 ===
Natural landscape made in Unreal Engine 5

Unreal Engine 5 features Nanite, a virtualized geometry system that allows game developers to use arbitrarily high quality meshes with automatically generated Level of Detail, and Lumen, a dynamic global illumination and reflections system that uses software and hardware ray tracing. It was revealed in May 2020 and officially released in April 2022.

=== Unreal Engine 6 ===
Epic Games chief executive Tim Sweeney first publicly discussed the development of Unreal Engine 6 (UE6) in 2024. In an interview with The Verge, Sweeney stated that the company was working towards a new version of the engine that would merge Epic Games' development tools with the systems built for Unreal Editor for Fortnite (UEFN).

Sweeney discussed Unreal Engine 6 on the Lex Fridman podcast in 2025, and indicated that the first preview builds would be available in two to three years. The next version will aim to unify the currently separate development streams used for Fortnite and the broader engine.

Epic Games officially announced Unreal Engine 6 on May 24, 2026, during the Rocket League Championship Series (RLCS) Paris Major. Alongside the announcement, Epic confirmed that Rocket League would become the first announced title to transition to Unreal Engine 6, replacing its long-running Unreal Engine 3 foundation.

In the State of Unreal 2026, more details were confirmed about UE6. Epic confirmed that Blueprints and Actors would eventually be replaced by Verse and Scene Graph (although they will be retained in the early versions of UE6), and that new technology will allow for more than 100 players to be in the same match at a time. They also confirmed an early access release date of "Late 2027-ish," with a full release around 12-18 months later.

During the 2026 Rocket League World Championship, even more details were confirmed. UE6 has been confirmed for release in 2027 with the next Rocket League game, with early testing happening from June 2026.

== Scripting ==
=== UnrealScript ===
UnrealScript
- Paradigm: Object-oriented, generic
- Developer: Tim Sweeney
- First appeared: May 1998; 28 years ago
- Typing discipline: Static, strong, safe
- OS: Cross-platform (multi-platform)
- Filename extensions: .uc .uci .upkg
- Website: docs.unrealengine.com

Influenced by
- C++, Java

UnrealScript (often abbreviated to UScript) was Unreal Engine's native scripting language used for authoring game code and gameplay events before the release of Unreal Engine 4. The language was designed for simple, high-level game programming. UnrealScript was programmed by Tim Sweeney, who also created an earlier game scripting language, ZZT-OOP. Deus Ex lead programmer Chris Norden described it as "super flexible" but noted its low execution speed.

Similar to Java, UnrealScript was object-oriented without multiple inheritance (classes all inherit from a common Object class), and classes were defined in individual files named for the class they define. Unlike Java, UnrealScript did not have object wrappers for primitive types. Interfaces were only supported in Unreal Engine generation 3 and a few Unreal Engine 2 games. UnrealScript supported operator overloading, but not method overloading, except for optional parameters.

At the 2012 Game Developers Conference, Epic announced that UnrealScript was being removed from Unreal Engine 4 in favor of C++. Visual scripting would be supported by the Blueprints Visual Scripting system, a replacement for the earlier Kismet visual scripting system.

One of the key moments in Unreal Engine 4's development was, we had a series of debates about UnrealScript – the scripting language I'd built that we'd carried through three generations. And what we needed to do to make it competitive in the future. And we kept going through bigger and bigger feature lists of what we needed to do to upgrade it, and who could possibly do the work, and it was getting really, really unwieldy. And there was this massive meeting to try and sort it out, and try to cut things and decide what to keep, and plan and...there was this point where I looked at that and said 'you know, everything you're proposing to add to UnrealScript is already in C++. Why don't we just kill UnrealScript and move to pure C++? You know, maximum performance and maximum debuggability. It gives us all these advantages.'

— Sweeney, Gamasutra, 2017

=== Verse ===
Verse is a programming language that was developed by Epic Games for programming in the Unreal Engine, and the Unreal Editor for Fortnite (UEFN), a game development software used to create player-made games in Fortnite. Verse was first implemented in UEFN on March 23, 2023, and it is the main scripting language for UEFN and Unreal Engine.

Verse was created along with UEFN by Epic Games with the aim of creating a programming language that allows UEFN creators to develop complex games and systems for the Fortnite multiverse. Simon Peyton Jones, known for his contributions to the Haskell programming language, joined Epic Games in December 2021 as Engineering Fellow to work on Verse with his long-time colleague Lennart Augustsson and others. Conceived by Tim Sweeney, it was officially presented at Haskell eXchange in December 2022 as an open source functional-logic language for the Fortnite metaverse. A research paper, titled The Verse Calculus: a Core Calculus for Functional Logic Programming, was also published.

The language was eventually launched in March 2023 as part of the release of the Unreal Editor for Fortnite (UEFN) at the Game Developers Conference. It is available to all Unreal Engine users.

== Marketplace ==
With Unreal Engine 4, Epic opened the Unreal Engine Marketplace in September 2014. The Marketplace is a digital storefront that allows content creators and developers to provide art assets, models, sounds, environments, code snippets, and other features that others could purchase, along with tutorials and other guides. Some content is provided for free by Epic, including previously offered Unreal assets and tutorials. Prior to July 2018, Epic took a 30% share of the sales but due to the success of Unreal and Fortnite Battle Royale, Epic retroactively reduced its take to 12%.

== Usage ==
=== Video games ===
Unreal Engine was originally designed to be used as the underlying technology for video games. The engine is used in a number of high-profile game titles with high graphics capabilities, including Hogwarts Legacy, PUBG: Battlegrounds, Final Fantasy VII Remake, Valorant and Yoshi's Crafted World, in addition to games developed by Epic, including Gears of War and Fortnite. Polish game developer CD Projekt is also planning to use the engine after retiring their in-house REDengine; their first game to use Unreal will be a remake of The Witcher.

Usage of Unreal Engine has been steadily increasing since 2012, from an estimated 17% market share to 28% in 2024, compared to Unity's 50%. By sales, Unreal accounts for 31% compared to Unity's 26%, with proprietary engines accounting for a combined 42%, making Unreal the largest engine by units sold.

=== Film and television ===
Animated short film made with Unreal Engine 5

Unreal Engine has found use in filmmaking to create virtual sets that can track with a camera's motion around actors and objects and be rendered in real time to large LED screens and atmospheric lighting systems. This allows for real-time composition of shots, immediate editing of the virtual sets as needed, and the ability to shoot multiple scenes within a short period by just changing the virtual world behind the actors. The overall appearance was recognized to appear more natural than typical chromakey effects.

External videos
- Industrial Light & Magic - The Virtual Production of The Mandalorian

Among the productions to use these technologies were the live action television series The Mandalorian, Westworld and Fallout, and the animated series Zafari, Barney's World, Miraculous: Tales of Ladybug & Cat Noir (as from its sixth season), The Amazing Digital Circus, Big City Greens, and Super Giant Robot Brothers. Jon Favreau and Lucasfilm's Industrial Light & Magic division worked with Epic in developing their StageCraft technology for The Mandalorian, based on a similar approach Favreau had used in The Lion King. Favreau then shared this technology approach with Westworld producers Jonathan Nolan and Lisa Joy. The show had already looked at the use of virtual sets before and had some technology established, but integrated the use of Unreal Engine as with StageCraft for its third season.

Orca Studios, a Spanish-based company, has been working with Epic to establish multiple studios for virtual filming similar to the StageCraft approach with Unreal Engine providing the virtual sets, particularly during the COVID-19 pandemic, which restricted travel.

In January 2021, Deadline Hollywood announced that Epic was using part of its Epic MegaGrants to back for the first time an animated feature film, Gilgamesh, to be produced fully in Unreal Engine by animation studios Hook Up, DuermeVela and FilmSharks. As part of an extension of its MegaGrants, Epic also funded 45 additional projects since around 2020 for producing feature-length and short films in the Unreal Engine. By October 2022, Epic was working with several different groups at over 300 virtual sets across the world. Unreal Engine was used for motion capture in Lyle, Lyle, Crocodile.

=== Other uses ===
Unreal Engine has also been used by non-creative fields due to its availability and feature sets. It has been used as a basis for a virtual reality tool to explore pharmaceutical drug molecules in collaboration with other researchers, as a virtual environment to explore and design new buildings and automobiles, and used for cable news networks to support real-time graphics. Some car companies, most prominently including Rivian, use Unreal Engine in their infotainment systems.

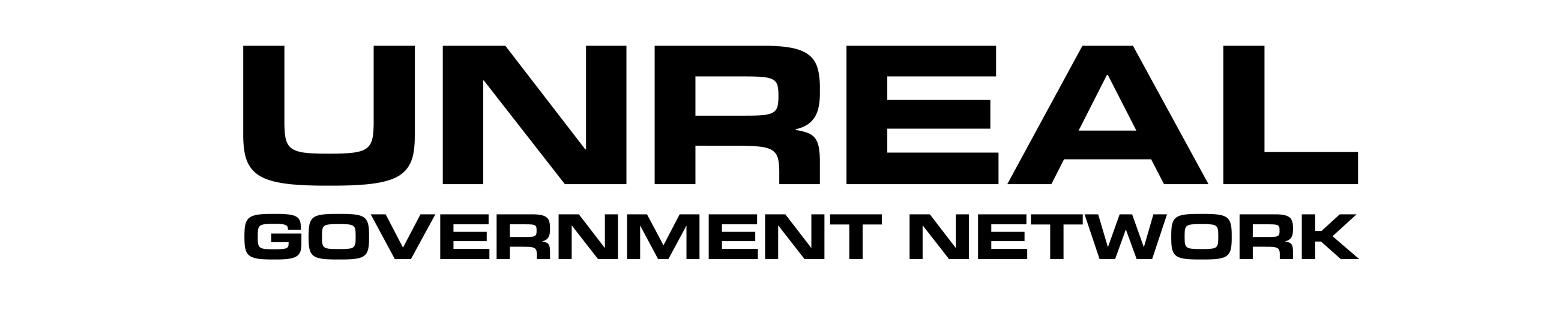

In March 2012, Epic Games announced a partnership with Virtual Heroes of Applied Research Associates to launch Unreal Government Network, a program that handles Unreal Engine licenses for government agencies. Several projects originated with this support agreement, including an anaesthesiology training software for U.S. Army physicians, a multiplayer crime scene simulation developed by the FBI Academy, and various applications for the Intelligence Advanced Research Projects Activity with the aim to help intelligence analysts recognize and mitigate cognitive biases that might affect their work. Similarly, the DHS Science and Technology Directorate and the U.S. Army's Training and Doctrine Command and Research Laboratory employed the engine to develop a platform to train first responders titled Enhanced Dynamic Geo-Social Environment (EDGE).

In 2024, the seventh generation Ford Mustang was released, which features a 12.4-inch digital instrument cluster and 13.2-inch infotainment touchscreen, powered by the Unreal Engine.

== Awards ==
The engine has received numerous awards:

- Technology & Engineering Emmy Award from the National Academy of Television Arts and Sciences (NATAS) for "3D Engine Software for the Production of Animation" in 2018
- Primetime Engineering Emmy Award from the Television Academy for exceptional developments in broadcast technology in 2020
- Annie Award from ASIFA-Hollywood for technical advancement in animation in 2021
- Game Developer Magazine Front Line Award for Best Game Engine for 2004, 2005, 2006, 2007, 2009, 2010, 2011, and 2012
- Develop Industry Excellence Award for Best Engine for 2009, 2010, 2011, 2013, 2016, 2017, and 2018
- Guinness World Record for most successful video game engine in 2014.

== Legal aspects ==
The state of the Unreal Engine came up in Epic's 2020 legal action against Apple Inc. claiming anticompetitive behavior in Apple's iOS App Store. Epic had uploaded a version of Fortnite that violated Apple's App Store allowances. Apple, in response, removed the Fortnite app and later threatened to terminate Epic's developer accounts which would have prevented Epic from updating the Unreal Engine for iOS and macOS. The court agreed to grant Epic a permanent injunction against Apple to prevent Apple from taking this step, since the court agreed that would impact numerous third-party developers that rely on the Unreal Engine.

== See also ==
- Category:Unreal Engine games
- Stepico Games
- Procedural generation
- Make Something Unreal
- Epic Citadel
- The Matrix Awakens
- On-set virtual production
- Uncanny valley
- Unity (game engine)
- List of game engines
