= Vinyl Goddess from Mars =

1995 video game

Vinyl Goddess From Mars
- Developer: Six Pound Sledge Studios
- Publisher: Union Logic Software Publishing
- Platform: MS-DOS
- Release: 1995
- Genre: Platform
- Mode: Single-player

Vinyl Goddess from Mars is a 2D scrolling platform game developed by Six Pound Sledge Studios for MS-DOS and published by Union Logic Software Publishing in 1995. The game has three episodes (with only the first episode playable in the shareware version): Forests of Old, Caverns of Chaos, and The Return.

Debra Dare was the model for the box cover art, introduction screen, and pin-up poster.

== Plot ==
It is the year 200 billion. Vinyl is on her way to an intergalactic B-movie convention, when her spaceship is struck by a meteor shower. She crash lands on an unknown planet full of dangers.

== Development ==
The game was created by Jason Struck and Mark Lewis, and was intended to be a sequel to Epic MegaGames's Jill of the Jungle, but Epic was not satisfied with the quality of the game, and decided to release Jazz Jackrabbit instead. The story was then changed, and the game was published by Union Logic as an original title.

== Reception ==
In a 2009 review, Clint Basinger of Lazy Game Reviews called the title as "one of the most solid side-scrolling platform games" that he played on PC. He praised the game's graphics, controls, music, and tongue-in-cheek writing, but objected to the game's lackluster text-only ending.
