= Zyll =

1984 video game

- Developer: IBM
- Publisher: IBM
- Platform: IBM PCjr
- Release: 1984
- Genre: Role-playing
- Mode: Single-player

Zyll is a text-based role-playing video game published by IBM for the IBM PCjr in 1984. It was written by Marshal Linder and Scott Edwards, two IBM employees, and marketed as an adventure game.

== Plot ==
The story begins in the "Land of Magic and Enchantment" where a young man named Zyll was unsuccessfully attempting to become a master of black magic. His ultimate goal was to become "Ruler of the Realm", an ambition for which he was eventually banished. After banishment, Zyll accidentally discovered the magical "Black Orb" upon throwing a failed potion to the ground. The ancient texts said that anyone possessing the Black Orb would become more powerful than all of the other sorcerers.

Zyll used his newfound powers to take revenge against the Land of Magic and Enchantment by stealing the "Great Treasures" that had been hidden in secret vaults for many years. He eventually turned the once prosperous country into a dark and barren wasteland.

Players are given the role of a daring adventurer who has decided to steal the Black Orb from Zyll in order to return the Land of Magic and Enchantment to its previous splendor. Upon obtaining the Black Orb, the player must collect at least four of the stolen Great Treasures in order to be instantly transported to the Land of Magic and Enchantment. Game-play begins with the player being transported to Zyll's home, the Castle Mitain.

== Gameplay ==
The objective of the game is to find the Black Orb — which the evil sorcerer Zyll used to turn the Land of Magic and Enchantment into a wasteland — to restore the realm. During the course of the game, various monsters appear to do battle.

Players can choose the role of a warrior, thief, or wizard. Each role has different attributes, skills, and weaknesses. Players can also choose between three types of armor, three different weapons, and two types of shields. Players choosing the role of wizard are able to choose between five different spells.

The game has a two-player mode allowing players to work cooperatively or competitively; each player uses half of the keyboard for their commands.

Zyll has a function key interface based on the arrangement of the keys on a PC/XT keyboard. In the same year of Zyll's release, IBM released new AT keyboards which moved the function keys to the top of the keyboard. Within the game, one can switch to the AT keyboard layout by pressing Alt-K.
