= Arya Vaiv =

1994 video game

- Developer(s): Megadream Software
- Publisher(s): Dongleware Verlags GmbH
- Platform(s): Amiga, MS-DOS
- Release: 1994
- Genre(s): Scrolling shooter
- Mode(s): Single player

Arya Vaiv is a 1994 computer game for the Amiga and MS-DOS platforms. It is a top-down space shooter with available power-ups and a constant stream of enemies.
