= Jill of the Jungle =

- Trilogy cover art
- Developer: Epic MegaGames
- Publisher: Epic MegaGames
- Designer: Tim Sweeney
- Artists: Joe Hitchens; John Pallett‑Plowright
- Composer: Dan Froelich
- Platform: MS-DOS
- Release: June 1992
- Genre: Platform
- Mode: Single-player

Jill of the Jungle is a trilogy of scrolling platform games released in 1992 by Epic MegaGames. It followed the method of distribution used by Apogee Software, where the first game is freely available and promotes the purchase of the additional episodes. The three episodes are Jill of the Jungle, Jill Goes Underground, and Jill Saves the Prince. They were combined into Jill of the Jungle: The Complete Trilogy a year later.

== Gameplay ==
Gameplay screenshot

Jill of the Jungle is a platform game. The player controls the eponymous Jill and is able to run, jump, and fire various weapons collected within each level such as a dagger or spiral blade. Each level is populated with monsters and puzzles to challenge the player. Several levels include special features that allow the player to transform Jill into other forms with special types of movement such as the flying phoenix bird, jumping frog, and swimming fish. Other levels involve switches, keys and other challenges the player must overcome to finish the level. Upon finishing a level, the player is returned to the map level. The map level itself is organized in a way that requires the player to complete certain levels before they can proceed to the next area.

The first episode features 14 levels (including an ending level), two bonus levels all linked together by a map level, and two finish levels where the player is passive. The second episode does not have a map level, and instead features 19 consecutive levels and an ending level. The third and final episode has a different style of map level, an overhead view, that is a significant departure from the first two episodes.

== Development ==
Tim Sweeney was inspired to create a Nintendo-style game featuring a female protagonist as a distinguishing feature. The game started as a platforming level editor. Lacking the skills to do the art and music, he hired four people. He said it is the "last game [he] designed".

Jill of the Jungle: The Complete Trilogy was released for free at GOG.com in November 2018.

== Reception ==
Shortly after its release, 20 to 30 copies were sold daily.

== Legacy ==
Jill of the Jungle II was in development by another studio, but was changed into Vinyl Goddess from Mars published by Union Logic in 1995.

Onesimus: Quest for Freedom (1992) is based on the Jill of the Jungle engine.
