= The Adventures of Maddog Williams in the Dungeons of Duridian =

1992 video game

- Developer: Game Crafters
- Publisher: Game Crafters
- Platforms: Amiga, Atari ST, MS-DOS
- Release: 1992
- Genre: Graphic adventure
- Mode: Single-player

The Adventures of Maddog Williams in the Dungeons of Duridian is a graphic adventure developed by Game Crafters and published in 1992 for Amiga, Atari ST, and MS-DOS. The game is a cross between a text adventure and a role-playing game in which the player assumes the role of Maddog Williams, a shopkeeper and inventor from the seaside town of Marinor.

The game is now freely available for download from the developers' website. A sequel, Escape from Cylindria, was planned, but not completed.

== Gameplay ==
Players control the eponymous Maddog Williams and must guide him through eight quests. The quest begins in Maddog's home; the player is able to explore before gradually finding clues on how to progress further due to the relatively non-linear nature of the game compared to other adventures. The game's environments house objects to manipulate and non-player characters to converse with for information, as well as enemies who can be vanquished through combat.
