= Cases Computer Simulations =

UK video game developer and publisher

- Company type: Private
- Industry: Video games
- Headquarters: London, United Kingdom

Cases Computer Simulations (known as CCS) was a British video game developer and publisher which specialized in strategy and war games for the ZX Spectrum, a number of which were ported to the BBC Micro, Acorn Electron, Amstrad CPC, and IBM PC.

Their cassette inlays often featured quite stylized pictures and they were renowned for producing a succession of high quality games. Many of their later releases were written by well-known wargamers R T Smith & Ken Wright and received excellent reviews in the mid and late 1980s. They were based at 14, Langton Way, London. SE3 7TL.

== Games ==
- Battle 1917 (1983)
- United (1984)
- The Prince (1984)
- Warzone (1984)
- Arnhem (1985)
- Desert Rats: The North Africa Campaign (1985)
- Stalingrad (1988)
- Encyclopedia of War: Ancient Battles (1988)
- Vulcan (1986)
