= Ancients 1: Death Watch =

1991 video game

Ancients 1: Deathwatch
- Developer: Farr-Ware Software
- Publisher: Epic MegaGames
- Programmer: Mark Lewis
- Artists: Jason Struck; Matthew McEwan
- Platform: MS-DOS
- Release: NA: 1991
- Genre: Role-playing
- Mode: Single-player

Ancients 1: Death Watch is a first-person medieval fantasy turn-based RPG for MS-DOS. Version 1.2 was released as shareware in 1991, developed and self-published by Farr-Ware. Version 2.0 was later published by Epic MegaGames on August 12, 1993. The game was programmed by Mark Lewis, and its graphic art was created by Jason Struck and Matthew McEwan.

== Plot ==
Players are told that during their youth they got lost while exploring the wilderness surrounding their home city of Locklaven. They were rescued by a beautiful harp playing fairy who put them into a magically enchanted sleep and teleported them back home. Years later, after having done much travelling, the player returns to Locklaven and becomes aware of a new great evil, and suspects that the fairy who saved them has been kidnapped.

== Gameplay ==
Ancients 1 screenshot

Ancients is a standard fare dungeon crawl with a simplified Dungeons & Dragons element of character creation including Warrior, Priest, Mage, Rogue classes; Elf, Human, Dwarf races; and the rerollable statistics of Hitpoints, Dracos (Money), Intelligence, Strength, Constitution and Dexterity. Players control a party of four characters.

The world is a static grid based system with the top level being the relatively safe city of Locklaven including an Inn to recover hitpoints and mana and listen to rumors, an equipment shop to purchase gear, a casino to gamble, a church to heal and resurrect dead characters, and a guild to train characters. Beneath the city is a sewer system followed by a number of different levels corresponding to increasingly difficult monsters.

Combat is randomly triggered by walking through the dungeon and is turn based allowing the player characters to attack first. Combat choices include a Basic Melee or Ranged Attack, Defend, Flee and Magic. Player characters are effectively lined up in a square for combat with the left and right most characters lined up in back and the middle two characters in front, meaning in combat only the middle two characters can use melee attacks while the left and right most characters must attack from range or use magic.

Magic is broken down into the two primary classes of Priest and Mage. There are five accessible tiers of magic usage for each class and access to each tier is based upon character level. The first tier is available at level one. Access to tiers improves by one for each two levels gained, until the fifth tier is achieved.

Leveling occurs when characters receive enough experience from slaying monsters to reach the next level tier. Players must then travel back up to the city of Locklaven and visit the Guild. There are no other major quests than the storyline driven rescue.

== Release and later history ==
The Ancients 1 title screen.

Ancients 1 was released as shareware, allowing other parties to also distribute the game.

=== Critical reception ===
Ancients was reviewed by PC-Review magazine, being called "unusually well-presented in terms of graphics and its user-friendly point and click interface".

Reception

Review scores
Publication	Score
AllGame	1/5
The Good Old Days	3/6

=== Shovelware ===
Both versions of the game have appeared on various shovelware CD-ROMs, especially during the nineties. In 1994, Ancients 1 was included on Aztech New Media Corp's Adventure Shareware Games - Volume 4, STG Computer Limited's Gamefest in August, Tech Express Software's 101 Games #1 in October, and the 13th edition of EMS Professional Software's The EMS Professional CD Collection in December. Walnut Creek CD-ROM included the game on their Giga Games in August 1993, Giga Games 3 in August 1995, and Giga Games 5 in April 1997. Australian software publishing company Nodtronics Pty Ltd included it on volume #3 of their The Best 40 Games compilation series in 1996, as well as their The World's Best 6000 Games six-CD collection in 1998. In July 2010, Ancients 1 was also included on a DVD, 501 Awesome DOS Games!, accompanying issue #179 of Australia's PC PowerPlay magazine.

== Sequel ==
A sequel was created in 1994, Ancients II: Approaching Evil. Although players can choose to import their party from the first game, the sequel has a new storyline that is not explicitly linked to the original. An opening animation shows members of the 'Lockshire Council' discussing an evil that is escaping from a series of catacombs, after an ancient seal formerly containing the evil has become broken. A member of the council explains that he knows of a party that he believes can repair the seal, and summons them to the new city. The seal will only become restored when four special objects are recovered and brought to the entrance of the catacombs.

Unlike the original, Approaching Evil was not shareware and was sold commercially.

== See also ==
- List of roleplaying games
- List of MS-DOS games
- Vinyl Goddess From Mars (also created by Mark Lewis, Mathew J. McEwan and Jason Struck)
- Radix: Beyond the Void (also worked on by Mark Lewis and Jason Struck)
