= Zeppelin (video game) =

1994 video game

- Amiga cover art
- Developer: Ikarion
- Publisher: MicroProse
- Designer: Sven Vogelgesang
- Platforms: Amiga, MS-DOS
- Release: 1994
- Genre: Business simulation
- Modes: Single-player, multiplayer

Zeppelin, also known as Zeppelin: Giants of the Sky, is a video game developed by German studio Ikarion and published by MicroProse for the Amiga and MS-DOS compatible operating systems in 1994.

== Gameplay ==
Zeppelin is an economic simulation in which players build a fleet of airships.

== Development and release ==
Zeppelin was developed by the German studio Ikarion and primarily designed by Sven Vogelgesang. It was announced as one of two initial releases from the developer (the other being Mad News), which was an offshoot of parent company Kingsoft GmbH. MicroProse acquired the international distribution license for essentially no cost.

== Reception ==
Next Generation reviewed the PC version of the game, rating it two stars out of five, and stated that "A few extras like the two-player mode, stock market controls, and open air competitions, add little spice to what ends up being very bland fare."

In 1996, Computer Gaming World declared Zeppelin the 35th-worst computer game ever released.

In 1994, Power Play (a German computer game magazine) added it to the list of "Best 100 games in 1994" in their special edition 9.

In March 1994, ASM (Aktueller Software Markt) - a German computer and video game magazine - rated Zeppelin with 11 out of 12 and gave the award "ASM Hit/very good". "Chic presentation and an unusual game idea make a successful genre mix".
