= The Logic Factory =

Video game development company

- Company type: Public
- Industry: Video games
- Founded: 1993
- Headquarters: United States
- Website: http://www.logicfactory.com/

The Logic Factory was an American video game development company founded by Jason and Todd Templeman in 1993. The brothers were joined in early 1994 by Thomas Blom to begin developing the demo that would secure initial distribution deals. The company is responsible for Ascendancy (1995), a turn-based science fiction strategy game for the PC, The Tone Rebellion (1997), and Ascendancy for mobile gaming on the iOS platform (2011). In June 2014, The Logic Factory ceased maintaining its website and after 19 years released the domain which as of January 2018 remains available for purchase.

== Projects ==
Over the year since the release of the iOS version of Ascendancy (January 2011—January 2012), Logic Factory released several free updates to the game via the Apple iTunes App Store. These updates included new features to the game, such as long-range ship movement ordering, a ship design library, and graphics enhancements including colony production statistics appearing in the form of icons in the main display of the game.

Logic Factory had announced they would be continuing to work on new updates to Ascendancy iOS and would do so until the development team believes to have reached an appropriate stopping point, at which time they may decide to see this version of Ascendancy ported to other platforms, such as Android, Mac, PC, and/or consoles. Logic Factory stated they were working on new updates for Ascendancy, other games that fit within the Ascendancy universe, and products based upon years of time spent in research and development. The company announced they were committed to making Ascendancy II, but they had not revealed details of its design and development.

Ascendancy II -- September 19, 2012 Ascendancy Interview -- May 4, 2012 Space Sector, Ascendancy Interview -- April 27, 2012 New Gamer Nation, Ascendancy Interview -- 2011 Tech Anarch, Ascendancy Interview -- Oct 15, 2011
