= Alien Virus =

1995 video game

- Developers: Trecision; Visionaries International
- Publisher: Nova Spring
- Composer: Angelo Bordieri
- Platform: MS-DOS
- Release: 1995
- Genre: Adventure
- Mode: Single-player

Alien Virus is a video game developed by Trecision and released in 1995 for MS-DOS.

== Plot ==
The player character, a pilot named Joshua Stone, lands on Station Zeus after a month in hyper space, but finds the space station devoid of life.

== Reception ==
Computer Gaming World gave Alien Virus 2 stars and stated that "This game is fun to play and an improvement on the old text adventure format in many respects. However, it is also lacking in effective text, the greatest strength of the best text adventures."

Alien Virus was reviewed in PC Gamer US, which rated the game 59% and stated "If the puzzles had been more interesting, or more closely related to the story, I might have at least stuck with the game to its end. But ultimately, Alien Virus proved to be too much of a snooze to be worth it." Computer Game Review was similarly indifferent on the game.

The website Game Zero said: "Alien Virus could have been an excellent title. However, it just didn't have the overall captivating pull that it needs. The biggest pitfalls were the slow/too sensitive control interface, which can make things you want to happen almost impossible at times."

German magazine PC Games criticized the poor controls, but felt the graphics and animations compensated for that. German magazine PC Player joked that although Alien Virus is not likely to cause a headache in professionals, there is a latent risk of infection for beginners and advanced users.

The website Just Adventure in 2000 gave the game a "D" and said: "The premise is overly familiar, though not a game killer; it's basically the same story as the original film Alien. Your character, Joshua, is dispatched to a space station to make some deliveries. Your girlfriend is also working on this station. While you're en route, the stations gets infected with a mysterious--you guessed it!--Alien Virus. Okay, so this isn't so very different from the plot of System Shock 2, which is a great game, so I'm not going to blame the story."
