= Zone Raiders =

1995 video game

- EU Cover art
- Developer: Image Space Incorporated
- Publisher: Virgin Interactive Entertainment
- Platforms: Classic Mac OS, MS-DOS
- Release: NA: November 30, 1995
- Genre: Vehicular combat
- Modes: Single-player, multiplayer

Zone Raiders is a 1995 video game for MS-DOS and Mac developed by Image Space Incorporated and published in North America by Virgin Interactive in 1995. It is a vehicular combat game in which players race in futuristic hovercraft with embedded weapons through a post-apocalyptic series of zones. Zone Raiders was the debut title of the developer, who had previously developed vehicle and aircraft simulation software for private businesses. Upon release, the game received an average reception, with critics praising the gameplay, sense of speed and handling of the game's vehicles, with some critiquing the game's visual design and finding the game was too derivative of other vehicular combat and action titles.

== Gameplay ==
Gameplay screenshot

Players race a hovercar on a flat track guided by guardrails, set across 16 different tracks. The objective of the game is to navigate the tracks to retrieve certain objects by driving over them, and once all objects are collected, crossing the exit within a time limit. Weapons are attached to the hovercraft and fire automatically at enemies, including a default laser gun, or machine guns, grenade launchers or mortars, each with ammo that can be collected throughout levels. The selected weapon fire can be changed by pressing the number keys. Speed or shield boosts can also be collected, as well as power-ups, such as a jetpack or laser amplifier. The player is pursued by enemy ECO patrols; if the time limit runs out in a level, an invulnerable Guardian will also pursue the player. Vehicles can be upgraded, traded and repaired in between missions, with the starting vehicle resembling a Ford Thunderbird, and later vehicles resembling a Humvee and a Coupe; each have different handling styles and weapons. It features three difficulty levels, a Recon mode for players to drive across tracks with no objectives or enemies,, and a multiplayer mode for up to four players in team or sudden death matches. The game supports joystick compatibility, including for Thrustmaster controllers.

== Plot ==
In a post-apocalyptic future after a nuclear war, most of the Earth has been left unhabitable. The survivors have been segregated, with the healthy population forming the Emergency Containment Organisation (ECO) sealed off the remnants of the cities and banished the irradiated and mutated population, the Raiders, into the wastelands. The player assumes the role of a Raider, navigating through the Zones of the wasteland with a gang named Freedom Flight to reach the Freezone, the only part of the planet unaffected by the fallout. ECO Zone Patrols have been set up throughout the player's journey to prevent them from reaching the Freezone.

== Development ==
Zone Raiders was developed by Image Space Incorporated, a company that had previously developed automotive and aircraft simulations for businesses such as Mercedes-Benz, General Motors and McDonnell Douglas. The game was developed using the studio's CUBE engine, facilitating real-time 3D acceleration and allowing for courses to be texture mapped. It was showcased at a Demo Day by publisher Virgin Interactive Entertainment, and a 3Dfx display at the Computer Game Developer's Conference. A tech demo featuring the driving gameplay was also made available in 1994.

== Reception ==
Reception

Review scores
Publication	Score
Computer Gaming World	3/5
GameSpot	6.5/10
Next Generation	4/5
PC Gamer (US)	89%
PC Zone	65%
Computer Game Review	90%
PC Entertainment	3.5/5

Zone Raisders received average reviews upon release. Some critics remarked that the game was derivative of a recent trend of vehicular combat games, comparisons drawn to Descent, Wipeout and Quarantine. However, several critics expressed surprise at the enjoyability of the gameplay, with some remarking that it conveyed a satisfying sense of speed. Its controls and vehicle physics were also praised, with Computer Game Review finding them smooth to play, at a forgiving difficulty, and enhanced by the joystick. Similarly, PC Entertainment wrote that the game featured "superb play mechanics and simple controls" that felt responsive and performed "like you'd expect hovercars to perform". In contrast, Computer Gaming World felt the game lacked mission variety and the hovercraft theme detracted from the visceral appeal of vehicular compat.

Critics were divided on the visual presentation of Zone Raiders, with some being underwhelmed: PC Zone described the graphics as "garish and messy", and Tal Blevins of GameSpot its "monotony and flat graphics", writing that it added to the tedium of tracks and mad it difficult to identify approaching curves. Other critics generally praised the graphics; whilst expressing that vehicle detail could have been improved, Martin Cirulis of Computer Gaming World praised the game's "impressive" cityscapes and tracks, considering care had been taken to model the environments. Similarly, Scott Wolf of PC Gamer felt the environments were complex and their "subdued palette" was appropriate for the isolation conveyed by the setting of uncharted territory.
