= Fire Fight =

1996 video game

- Developer: Chaos Works
- Publisher: Electronic Arts
- Platform: Windows
- Release: NA: July 3, 1996
- Genre: Action
- Mode: Single-player

Fire Fight is an isometric shoot 'em up video game developed by Polish studio Chaos Works, produced by Epic MegaGames and published by Electronic Arts for Windows.

== Gameplay ==
Fire Fight is a two-dimensional top-down shooter.

== Reception ==
Reception

Review scores
| Publication | Score |
|---|---|
| Computer Gaming World | 3/5 |
| GameSpot | 6.8/10 |
| Next Generation | 4/5 |

Award
| Publication | Award |
|---|---|
| Adrenaline Vault | 1996 Best Arcade Game |

Next Generation gave four stars out of five, commending the gameplay, action, intuitive controls, and weapon selection.

== Reviews ==
- PC Gamer (August 1996)
- PC Player (Germany) - Aug, 1996
- PC Multimedia & Entertainment (Jul 09, 1996)
- Gamesmania.de (1996)
- The Adrenaline Vault (Jul 03, 1996)
- Joystick (French) (Jul, 1996)
- GameSpot (Jul 03, 1996)
