= The Ancient Art of War at Sea =

1987 video game

- Developer: Evryware
- Publisher: Broderbund
- Series: The Ancient Art of War
- Platforms: Apple II, MS-DOS, Mac, PC-98
- Release: 1987
- Genre: Real-time strategy
- Mode: Single-player

The Ancient Art of War at Sea is a computer wargame developed by Broderbund and released for Mac and MS-DOS in 1987 as a sequel to The Ancient Art of War. The game is a simulation of naval combat set in the late 18th century. However, the historical opponents which the players have to face lived between the 16th century and the early 19th century. These hostile game characters include Alonso de Guzmán y Sotomayor, 7th Duke of Medina Sidonia (the commander of the Spanish Armada), Maarten Tromp (called "Martin" in the game), Blackbeard, John Paul Jones, and Horatio Nelson, 1st Viscount Nelson.

== Gameplay ==
The Ancient Art of War at Sea is a real-time naval strategy game in which players command fleets of sailing ships against computer-controlled opponents. The game features three types of vessels: frigates, ships of the line and flagships. Players select from six opponents, including historical naval commanders such as Horatio Nelson and Blackbeard, each possessing different strategic capabilities.

Gameplay is divided into three levels of command. At the strategic level, players view the overall battle area and direct fleet movements. A second level allows control of individual squadrons, including adjusting sails, positioning ships and firing broadsides. The third level focuses on boarding actions, with players directing crew members as they attack or defend enemy vessels. Wind direction, water conditions and the capabilities of opposing ships influence naval manoeuvres.

The game includes a scenario editor that allows players to create their own geographical environments, including islands and continents, and design custom naval engagements involving individual ships or entire fleets. In addition to the included campaigns, players can create and save their own scenarios.

== Development and release ==
The Ancient Art of War at Sea was developed by Evryware and published by Brøderbund Software as a sequel to the 1984 game The Ancient Art of War. Both games were designed and programmed by brothers Dave and Barry Murry, who had previously developed computer simulations and sports games before entering the historical strategy genre.

Edward Badasov served as the game's product manager, discussing its naval combat mechanics and strategic features in Brøderbund's summer 1987 newsletter.

The IBM PC/Tandy edition was marketed in the United States in summer 1987 at a suggested retail price of $44.95. Brøderbund subsequently promoted Apple II and Macintosh editions in summer 1988, also priced at $44.95.

== Reception ==
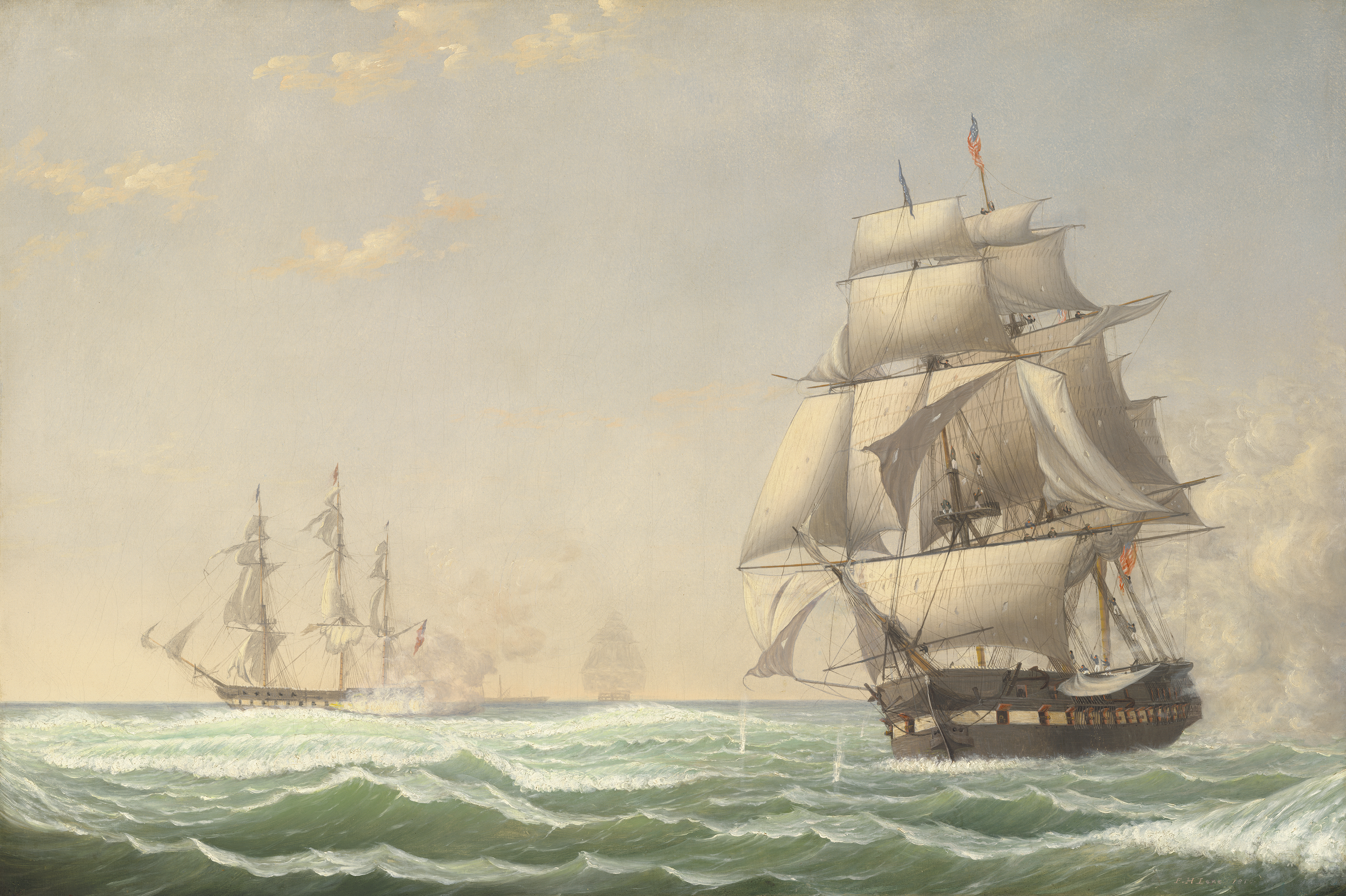
"The United States Frigate "President" Engaging the British Squadron" (1815) by Fitz Henry Lane is featured on the box art.

Computer Gaming World in 1987 stated that The Ancient Art of War at Sea "offers a powerful editing system and an enjoyable, playable game" that was superior to its predecessor, with excellent documentation. In 1990 the magazine gave the game three out of five stars, warning that gameplay favored single ships as opposed to fleet actions when fighting enemy fleets. In 1992 the magazine gave the game two stars, stating that it "plays wells as a game, but not as a serious study" and regretting that it was the only Age of Sail game for DOS.

Jerry Pournelle named War at Sea his game of the month for December 1987. Despite "a couple of user-interface problems", he said that fans of wargames or Horatio Hornblower novels would love it. Compute! in 1988 praised the documentation and editor. The game was reviewed in 1988 in Dragon by Hartley, Patricia, and Kirk Lesser in their "The Role of Computers" column. They agreed that War at Sea was better than its predecessor and called it a "must have", giving the game five out of five stars. They particularly enjoyed the ship-to-ship combat.

The game sold more than 100,000 copies.
