= Vision Software =

Software company

- Type: Video games
- Industry: Computer and video game software distribution
- Founded: 1990; 36 years ago
- Defunct: 1996
- Fate: Acquired by Electronic Arts, Inc, brand retired c. 1997
- Headquarters: Johannesburg, South Africa

Vision Software, later operating as Electronic Arts Africa, was a computer and video game software distributor, headquartered in Johannesburg, South Africa. It was founded in 1990. The company had regional offices in the cities of Durban and Cape Town, and had a high amount of growth in sales to Kenya, and to neighbors of South Africa, Zimbabwe, Namibia, Botswana and Eswatini.

Vision Software was acquired by Electronic Arts (EA) on April 8, 1996. Vision was the leader of software sales in South Africa at the time of its purchase by EA. It was acquired in order to allow direct distribution of software to the South African and neighboring regions. The group's final game was Norse by Norsewest in 1997; the company website was taken down at some point in the late 1990s and the name was retired.

EA used partnerships with other companies to distribute games in the region in later years, such as Prima Interactive. It ultimately ended physical distribution in the region entirely in 2023.
