= Ascendancy (video game) =

1995 video game

- Developer: The Logic Factory
- Publishers: Virgin Interactive Entertainment; Broderbund; Softgold
- Platforms: MS-DOS, iOS
- Release: NA: September 24, 1995; EU: 1995; iOS: Jan 05, 2011
- Genre: Turn-based strategy (4X)
- Mode: Single player

Ascendancy is a 4X science fiction turn-based strategy computer game. It was originally released for MS-DOS in 1995 and was updated and re-released for iOS in 2011 by The Logic Factory. Ascendancy is a galactic struggle to become the dominant life form, hence the title. The game's introductory cinematic states: "Wildly different cultures competed for the same worlds. In the enormous upheaval that followed, one of these species would gain ascendancy."

The iOS version of Ascendancy was a Universal app, meaning it was designed for both the iPad and the iPhone / iPod touch platforms.

The original Ascendancy was released during a golden age of 4X space games in the mid-1990s. Several reviewers praised the game for having great graphics being entertaining, and being fun to play.

The original version of the game won the Software Publisher's Association Codie award for Best Strategy Software of 1996, as voted on by games industry members.

The music of the game was composed by Nenad Vugrinec.

== Gameplay ==
In Ascendancy the player takes on the role of leader of an alien species, tasked with guiding their people into space to explore and colonize other worlds. The player does this by building structures and space ships, researching technology and growing stronger through war or diplomacy.

The System Display gives the player control of planets, spaceships, and interstellar combat. Here a Capelon player targets an enemy ship with an Orbital Whopper.

Players begin with a single colony planet which must be developed. They can select several types of buildings to construct on the planet's surface and can eventually construct spaceships and leave the planet altogether. Ships travel to other solar systems along determined paths, called star lanes. Spaceships can peacefully colonize unoccupied planets or invade inhabited planets and usurp structures. They can also do battle with enemy planets or other ships.

Ascendancy's primary display is a three-dimensional rotatable model of the star cluster, which details the star cluster's solar systems, starlanes, and civilizations. The player can "zoom in" to view rotatable models of solar systems (including planets and ships); view a planet's surface and use various screens to manage their fleet, planets and research. This play style is similar to the Master of Orion series.

=== Planets ===
Planets contain colored squares which can prevent construction or grant a bonus to certain types of buildings.

On each planet the player must manage three areas of development: Research, Industry and Prosperity. Research points are shared among all colonies and allow the player to learn new technology, such as advanced building structures or spaceship components. Industry, meanwhile, is local to each colony and determines how quickly that planet can complete projects. Prosperity determines how quickly a planet's population will grow, providing additional workers for future construction. Players begin with the ability to construct buildings for each of these areas and can discover more as the game progresses.

Planet topography is expressed as various colored squares. White squares are general purpose, where any structure can be built. Green squares increase the output of Prosperity-producing buildings, while red squares improve Industry and blue squares improve Research. There are also black squares, which are initially uninhabitable but can be used later in the game as the player researches technology. Planets have ten orbital squares that can be used to build shipyards, planetary defenses, space ships, and other space structures.

As the player explores other planets they may occasionally find ruins from an ancient civilization. These ruins can be harvested to gain undiscovered technologies, which can significantly alter the game.

=== Diplomacy ===
The Diplomacy screen lets players forge alliances, declare war or exchange information with other species.

Ascendancy contains a Diplomacy screen where players can offer alliances to other species, declare war and exchange information on star lanes, planets or research. Players can request military assistance from their allies or attempt to end declarations of war with hostile factions. There is also an Intelligence display where the player can view information on the relative power of known species.

=== Game parameters ===
Players can select several parameters to change the style of game.

When starting a new game players select several parameters, including their species, a star density, a political atmosphere and the number of opponents.

There are 21 species to choose from in Ascendancy, each of which has a unique special ability. Some abilities can be used at regular intervals, such as the Capelon's ability to make their colonies temporarily invulnerable. Other abilities, such as the Chronomyst traveling quickly through star lanes, are continually active. All opponent species (numbering from two to six) are controlled by a computer AI and are selected randomly.

The star density in each game determines how many solar systems exist in the star cluster - the higher the density the more planets that are available to colonize. Star density affects both the length of the game, as large star clusters will take longer to conquer, as well as affecting how quickly species will encounter each other and how much room they have to grow. Once a density is selected the particular type of each star system is generated randomly at the start of the game.

Selecting a political atmosphere of Peaceful, Neutral or Hostile determines the attitude of computer opponents when they have a colony in the same system as another species.

Even though the player has control over several things, the combination of random opponent species, random planet topography and random star types leads to a large variety of games.

== Plot ==
Several of the species in Ascendancy describe motivations for reaching to the stars. Some species are peaceful diplomats; some are curious explorers; and others want to kill or conquer other forms of life. However, plot in Ascendancy is thin. Players are free to imagine a detailed storyline but most plot is restricted to a single introductory screen for each species and a synopsis given at the end of each game.

== Development ==
The Logic Factory said that inspiration for Ascendancy came from "[having] read the fantastic books or watched some of the great shows that have explored the possibility of human contact with intelligent alien life. We do believe that there is a high likelihood that among the many billions of stars and planets just in our own Milky Way, other life is out there. ...This [game] is our own way of being part of that inevitable adventure."

=== Re-release for iOS ===
In 2010 the Logic Factory updated their website and announced that a remake of Ascendancy would be released for the iPhone and iPad, intended as "a fully upgraded remake tailored for modern wireless gaming." The Logic factory said the game would be similar to the original, but with "a complete overhaul" to the interface "in order to operate on mobile, wireless, touch screen devices", as well as having several "upgrades and modifications to the original AI."

An iOS version of Ascendancy was released on the Apple app store on Jan 05, 2011. It has since been removed.

== Reception ==
Reception

Review score
Publication	Score
Computer Game Review	91/92/92

Some reviewers sang high praises for Ascendancy upon release - the game won the Codie award for Best Strategy Software in 1996, while Next Generation Magazine called Ascendancy "one of the best space-strategy sims" and said "the variety of species will give you hours of replay value." In his 1995 PC Gamer review William R. Trotter called Ascendancy "simply the best game of its type yet published" and gave it the PC Gamer Editor's Choice award. Trotter was also one of the authors of the official Ascendancy strategy guide. Bruce Geryk said "the graphics were excellent, and the method of ship design was quite engaging," while Andy Bucher of PC Gamer UK said "it looks great ... everything looks slick, clean and well designed ... Ascendancy mixes just about the right level of complexity and challenge with an intuitive interface, great graphics and the odd spark of humour." Bucher even noted that Ascendancy had "one of the best tutorials [he'd] ever seen", and said the game's "attention to detail and ease of use is much rarer than it should be."

Other critics decried Ascendancy, however, for its unchallenging Artificial Intelligence as well as the excessive micromanagement required to compensate, because the AI is not only unchallenging as an opponent, but utterly unproficient at managing the player's planet and ships. In his look back at the history of space games, Geryk said "Ascendancy had the misfortune of being released with just about the worst AI ever in a computer game, to the extent that playing against the computer was almost pointless". Even Bucher said "the key problem lies in the artificial intelligence." A patch was released under the name Antagonizer, which was specifically designed to make the AI more challenging. It did this by making the enemies far more hostile towards the player but not toward each other, giving them the significant industrial advantage of allowing them to build their first 3 structures on their new planetary colonies in one day each, having the NPC species build the right structures on the right colored squares and having attacking ships stop right outside of range of orbital missile bases the player has in orbit, if they have weapons with sufficient range to attack the planet from a safe distance. The iOS version of Ascendancy released in 2011 included the AI from this patch, as well as other modifications.

The game sold approximately 250,000 copies

== Notes ==
=== Sources ===
- Ascendancy Game Manual, The Logic Factory, 1995.
