= Arctic Adventure (video game) =

1991 video game

- Developer(s): Apogee Software
- Publisher(s): Apogee Software
- Designer(s): George Broussard
- Engine: FAST
- Platform(s): DOS, Windows, macOS
- Release: October 9, 1991
- Genre(s): Platform
- Mode(s): Single-player

Arctic Adventure is a platform game written for DOS, published by Apogee Software. It is the sequel to Pharaoh's Tomb. The protagonist, Nevada Smith, is an archaeologist searching for a Viking treasure in the Arctic. It was re-released on Steam in 2015 with support for Windows and macOS.

== Gameplay ==
Screenshot of Episode 4 Level 2

The gameplay has many similarities to its predecessor, Pharaoh's Tomb, both games being based on the same FAST engine. The main difference is that the game starts in an overworld map and the player has to enter each of the 20 levels to play them. The last level is blocked and all the other levels have to be completed to access it. Some of the levels are across the icy lakes, requiring the player to obtain a boat from one of the levels to proceed. Some levels are blocked by gates which can be unlocked with keys collected from other levels.

During the levels Nevada Smith has infinite lives. He is armed with a pistol with limited ammo, but can be charged up with various pickups. Sometimes passages are blocked by ice blocks which can broken by using up collectable pickaxes. If the player exits a level via a drainpipe, four random bonus levels can be played for additional points. In the last level, the player wins the game and ends the episode by collecting a map piece quarter.

== Release ==
The working title for the game was "Journey to the Center of the Earth", but it was later renamed Arctic Adventure. Arctic Adventure was distributed as shareware. It consists of four episodes (named Volume 1 to 4), with only the first episode distributed as shareware, and the rest available commercially. Each level consists of a single room, and there are 20 levels in each episode. The game includes a map screen that gives some flexibility into the order in which the levels can be played.

The game was discontinued in 2000 and released as freeware on March 20, 2009. In October 2014, 3D Realms released 3D Realms Anthology, which included Arctic Adventure in the collection. The end of the game implies that Nevada Smith will continue his adventures, seeking the lost diamond mines of Africa, but a sequel was never made.

== See also ==
- Monuments of Mars - a similar game, also published by Apogee but developed separately by Todd Replogle
