= Arnhem (video game) =

1985 video game

- Developer: Robert T. Smith
- Publisher: CCS
- Platforms: MS-DOS, ZX Spectrum, Amstrad CPC, Amstrad PCW, Amiga
- Release: 1985
- Genre: Wargame
- Mode: Single-player

Arnhem: The 'Market Garden' Operation is a battle strategy game by CCS. It was released for the ZX Spectrum and Amstrad CPC in 1985, the Amstrad PCW in 1987, the MS-DOS in 1988, and for the Amiga in 1991.

== Overview ==
The player takes the role of either the Germans or the Allies at the Battle of Arnhem in 1944. They have the option of playing the entire campaign or subsections of it, with the computer playing the opposition. There is also a two-player mode.

== Gameplay ==
The game uses the overhead map view characteristic of traditional wargames, with combat units indicated by square tokens which the players move by turns. Additional units are added to the battle as reinforcements as the game progresses.

The Allies must capture the bridge at Arnhem within a set number of turns in order to win. The Germans win by successfully defending the Bridge. The campaign may be played in its entirety or the constituent actions may be played separately:

1. Advance to Eindhoven (7 turns): The Allies must clear the road to Eindhoven of German units
2. Operation Garden (10 turns): The advance of the British XXX Corps to Grave
3. Operation Market (26 turns): The advance to Arnhem; the Allies must capture the Bridge and establish a foothold in the town
4. The Bridge Too Far (15 turns): The defence of Arnhem; the Allies must repel German counterattacks and hold their position in the town
5. Market Garden (26 turns): the entire campaign from start to finish.

== Reception ==
Reception

Award
Publication	Award
Crash	Smash!
