= Zone 66 =

1993 video game

- Second floppy release cover art
- Developer: Renaissance
- Publisher: Epic MegaGames
- Designer: Thomas Pytel
- Programmer: Thomas Pytel
- Artist: Joe Hitchens
- Composers: Kenny Chou; Charles Scheffold
- Platform: IBM PC
- Release: 1993
- Genre: Multidirectional shooter
- Mode: Single-player

Zone 66 is a top down, multidirectional shooter released in 1993 for IBM PC compatibles as shareware. The game was created by a North American demoscene group called Renaissance, and was published by Epic MegaGames.

== Plot ==
In the 22nd century AD, an ex-GSA pilot has been tipped by a stranger that his hometown is in danger, but by the time he reaches the city limits, a nuclear bomb destroys the city along with his beloved wife and baby girl. The pilot uses a ship on a landing pad to meet with the stranger at a certain location. When the pilot reaches the location, he finds the stranger is dying but obtains some vital information. The pilot then gets a fighter plane and heads to a group of islands to begin his vigilante revenge.

As the pilot progresses from nation to nation destroying each base, the plot thickens and he begins to understand who and what he is dealing with and why the terrorism started.

== Gameplay ==
Before starting the selected mission, the player must choose a type of aircraft. Different planes have different statistics. When the plane has been selected the player can decide what weapons to take to the extent of the payload limit. After the plane inventory has been arranged the mission can begin from a starting supply bay. The player can also return to the supply bay to restock and repair, change aircraft type to use and change weapon types and quantities.

The player makes use of the loaded weapons to destroy air and land targets. Bombs are launched at the target indicator right in front of the plane. In addition to weapons the player has two types of maneuvers to counter hostilities with ease. The player has infinite chances unless all the supply bays are destroyed. The player also has a radar as a guide. All main ground targets must be destroyed to complete a mission.

== Soundtracks ==
Three different soundtracks were available for the game, depending on the user's sound card. The Sound Blaster soundtrack was composed of a mix of FM synthesis sounds and digital samples. This particular method of music creation and playback was unique to the Renaissance demogroup. The AdLib soundtrack consisted solely of FM synthesis sounds, due to most AdLib sound cards being incapable of playing digital audio. Some songs in the AdLib soundtrack were arrangements of those in the Sound Blaster soundtrack, while others are completely different songs altogether.

A third, separately downloadable soundtrack was available for owners of the Gravis Ultrasound sound card featuring high-quality music. Like the AdLib soundtrack, some of the Ultrasound's tracks were completely different songs, whereas others were arrangements of songs found in the AdLib or Sound Blaster versions.

The reason for the separate "GUS" music download was due to the size of the Gravis music: as it was nearly as large as the original game, users who only had a Sound Blaster or AdLib didn't have to waste time downloading music they would never hear. Disc versions of the game included all three, as players did not need to download the game.

== Release ==
Zone 66 was released primarily as shareware, on floppy disks, and CD-ROM. The first mission was released and distributed as shareware by GT Software. B&N Software released the first four missions of the game via floppy disk; Missions 1 and 2 were released together on one floppy disk, as were Missions 3 and 4. Epic MegaGames released all of the first four missions on two floppy disks. All eight missions were released on CD-ROM.

== Reception ==
Reception

Review score
Publication	Score
PC Format	91%

Award
Publication	Award
Shareware Top Ten	#1 Spot (September 1993)

Computer Gaming World in 1993 recommended Zone 66 to "joystick jockeys", but stated that "occasional thumb twitchers may find the action a bit much to bear, as this title is quite intense".
