= Radix: Beyond the Void =

1995 video game

- Developer: Neural Storm Entertainment
- Publishers: Epic MegaGames; Union Logic Software Publishing
- Platform: MS-DOS
- Release: November 2, 1995 v2.0: November 20, 1996
- Genre: First-person shooter
- Modes: Single-player, multiplayer

Radix: Beyond the Void is a 2.5D first-person shooter developed by Canadian studio Neural Storm Entertainment and published by Epic MegaGames for MS-DOS in 1995.

== Plot ==
In the 22nd century, humanity has achieved world peace. The United Earth Space Alliance (UESA) was able to fully concentrate on space exploration, and potentially expanding the possibilities of human life civilization beyond the Solar System.

In the year 2147, the first civilian ship was launched toward a gigantic asteroid on the outskirts of the Solar System to establish a base civilization that could sustain human life. After five months of space travel, they landed safely at the asteroid and successfully established the civilization, named Theta-2. The second vessel, Salvation, was launched from Earth shortly after, carrying the ten thousand civilians.

It happened on October 24, 2148. Just as the Salvation was reaching the Theta-2 base, the ship encountered a terrifying disturbance in space. Alien ships emerged from a rip in the very fabric of space, dubbed "The Void" by UESA, and tore the large ship apart with a giant particle beam, sealing the fates of ten thousand people on board.

UESA went to level one alert status, and sent a fleet of fighters to combat the alien attack, but their efforts proved to be no match against the alien dreadnought, and all UESA spacecraft was destroyed after a grueling battle.

In a desperate attempt to face the alien threat, the inter-dimensional starfighter Radix was constructed and loaded onto the Defiance battlecruiser, bound for Theta-2. The Radix was humanity's last hope for survival.

Episode One: "Theta-2" - The aliens have wiped out all traces of human life from the Theta-2 base, and have begun utilizing UESA technology for their own evil ends. The Radix starfighter must eradicate all alien presence from Theta-2, and reclaim the base from being overtaken by alien forces.

Episode Two: "Vengeance" - While the Radix starfighter successfully thwarted the alien takeover of Theta-2, the large alien spaceship has since left the area and is now headed for Earth. Radix must penetrate the large alien vessel and stop it at all costs, before it brings mass destruction to Earth.

Episode Three: "The Void" - After defeating the large alien ship, the final and deadliest mission remains. The Void, a gateway to the dimension that the aliens call home, remains open. To prevent any future attacks, the Radix pilot must fly into the Void in a desperate effort to stop the alien threat and seal the portal closed, and escape back into this dimension before the Void closes forever.

== Gameplay ==
Radix: Beyond the Void is a first person shooter which takes place in a zero gravity dimension where the player controls a ship through various environments, with mission objectives that must be completed to advance to the next area. The player is given a debriefing before each level that explains the mission for the level, and explains additional objectives that can be completed for extra points. These objectives usually involve destroying a power generator, destroying or activating a computer terminal, or eradicating alien presence from a vital area.

The game is divided into three episodes. "Theta-2" "Vengeance" and "The Void", each with 8 levels, and one hidden bonus level per episode. "Theta-2" was released as a shareware episode.

The Radix ship has three basic health units - armor, shields and energy. The shields protect the ship's armor, and will take damage from enemy fire or wall collisions. The player loses a life once the ship's armor is depleted. The player can increase their flying speed either by using a throttle, or by using afterburners to fly at maximum speed. Energy is required for the use of afterburners, as well as certain weapons. The ship's energy and shields regenerate slowly on their own, but can be refilled to the max by finding a powerup.

The player will encounter a variety of enemy alien ships and fodder that will shoot at the player. Bio-mines will try to detonate on player's ship and will do massive damage. Some enemies will shoot missiles - both standard, as well as seeking missiles which will lock onto and follow the player's ship.

The Radix ship has a radar scanner, which will display enemy positions in relation to the fighter. There is also a threat indicator, which will light up when an enemy missile has locked onto the ship.

A variety of power-ups can be found in each level, that will help the player fight enemies, increase health, or give the player a certain ability for a limited amount of time. There are seven different types of weapons available to the Radix, with only four available in the first episode. Some weapons require the ship's energy to use, while others are arsenal-based. Plasma bombs can also be acquired, which will deal massive damage to any enemy visible on the screen when detonated. A single plasma bomb can wipe out an entire room of weaker enemies.

There are various environmental hazards, such as missile walls, teleports, gravitational disturbances that will hinder/alter movement, and moving walls/floors that can damage or kill the player.

After a mission's primary objective is completed, the player must find their way to the exit door to advance to the next area.

== Release ==
Versions 1.0 and 1.1 use game controls where the player's ship is always moving forward at a slow speed, and is not possible to stop or fly backwards.

Version 1.1 was released at the beginning of 1996, and fixed a few elements, such as tightening navigation controls to make it easier to bank up & down, and also increasing the durability of the ship so as not to take significant damage from minor things like touching a wall. The first two levels of episode 1 were also significantly modified.

The 2.0 "REMIX" patch was released in late 1996, and introduced a number of new features. A few levels were modified, most notably the boss levels. The game controls are significantly reworked - the player's vehicle will hover in place until any of the separate forward, backward, or strafe controls are used. Afterburners still require energy to use, but can boost speed in any direction. Enemies are much harder to sneak up on, as they will detect the player's presence once they are within scanner range, regardless of walls or barriers between them. Defeated enemies will leave debris behind. The threat indicator will also light up when standard missiles have been fired by an enemy, as well as seeking missiles. The screen will also flash blue instead of red when a player's shields take damage, and flash red only when the shields are depleted and their armor takes damage. Version 2.0 also fixes a programming glitch from all previous versions in episode 2, where if the player finds and completes the hidden level, the game will skip over level 5 completely and go straight to level 6.

== Reception ==
Jon Mavor, the main programmer of Neural Storm Entertainment, has said the game "didn't sell well" and "didn't really make any money".
