= List of PC games (U) =

The following page is an alphabetical section from the list of PC games.

== U ==
| Name | Developer | Publisher | Genre(s) | Operating system(s) | Date released |
|---|---|---|---|---|---|
| ÜberSoldier | Burut Creative Team | Burut Creative Team | First-person shooter | Microsoft Windows | March 29, 2006 |
| UFL | Strikerz Inc. | Strikerz Inc. | Sports | Microsoft Windows | December 5, 2025 |
| Undertale | Toby Fox | Toby Fox | RPG | Microsoft Windows, Linux, macOS | September 15, 2015 |
| Undisputed | Steel City Interactive | Deep Silver | Sports | Microsoft Windows | October 11, 2024 |
| Universe Sandbox | Giant Army | Giant Army | Casual, simulation, indie | Microsoft Windows | April 29, 2011 |
| Unreal | Epic MegaGames, Digital Extremes | GT Interactive | First-person shooter | Microsoft Windows, macOS | May 22, 1998 |
| Unreal II: The Awakening | Legend Entertainment | Infogrames | First-person shooter | Microsoft Windows | February 3, 2003 |
| Unreal Tournament | Epic Games, Digital Extremes | GT Interactive, Infogrames, Redversiongamer | First-person shooter | Microsoft Windows, Linux, macOS | November 30, 1999 |
| Unreal Tournament 2003 | Epic Games, Digital Extremes | Infogrames | First-person shooter | Microsoft Windows, Linux, macOS | October 1, 2002 |
| Unreal Tournament 2004 | Epic Games, Digital Extremes, Psyonix, Streamline Studios | Atari, MacSoft, Midway Games | First-person shooter | Microsoft Windows, Linux, macOS | March 16, 2004 |
| Unreal Tournament 3 | Epic Games | Midway Games | First-person shooter | Microsoft Windows | November 19, 2007 |
| Until Dawn | Ballistic Moon | Sony Interactive Entertainment | Survival horror; Interactive drama | Microsoft Windows | October 4, 2024 |
| Unturned | Nelson Sexton | Smartly Dressed Games | Open-world, first-person shooter, RPG | Microsoft Windows, macOS | July 7, 2017 |
