= Kyle Peschel =

Kyle "Pezman" Peschel is a video game producer, director and editor. He lives in Santa Monica, California.

Peschel is credited in the game TimeShift (2007) as Sierra's external producer. He was the senior producer of Battle Engine Aquila (2003).

Peschel is the owner of gaming news site GameGossip and the GameGossip Community Forums. He used to be the Head Administrator at Ataricommunity Forums.

== Games credited ==
- Brütal Legend (2008), Vivendi Games
- TimeShift (2007), Vivendi Games
- Marc Ecko's Getting Up: Contents Under Pressure (2006), Atari
- Retro Atari Classics (2005), Atari
- Dead Man's Hand (2004), Atari
- Forgotten Realms: Demon Stone (2004), Atari
- Shadow Ops: Red Mercury (2004), Atari
- Unreal Tournament 2004 (2004), Atari
- Unreal Tournament 2004 (DVD Special Edition) (2004), Atari
- Apex (2003), Infogrames
- Battle Engine Aquila (2003), Infogrames
- Enter the Matrix (2003), Infogrames
- Mission: Impossible Operation Surma (2003), Atari
- Neverwinter Nights Gold (2003), Atari
- Neverwinter Nights: Hordes of the Underdark (2003), Atari
- Superman: Countdown to Apokolips (2003), Infogrames
- Terminator 3: Rise of the Machines (2003), Atari
- Terminator 3: War of the Machines (2003), Atari
- Unreal II: The Awakening (2003), Infogrames
- Big Air Freestyle (2002), Infogrames
- Godzilla: Destroy All Monsters Melee (2002), Infogrames
- Godzilla: Domination (2002), Infogrames
- Gothic II (2002), JoWooD Productions
- Men in Black II: Alien Escape (2002), Infogrames
- Neverwinter Nights (2002), Infogrames
- Splashdown (2002), Infogrames
- Superman: Shadow of Apokolips (2002), Infogrames
- Tactical Ops: Assault on Terror (2002), Infogrames
- TransWorld SURF (2002), Infogrames
- Unreal Championship (2002), Infogrames
- Unreal Tournament 2003 (2002), Infogrames
- Aliens Versus Predator 2 (2001), Sierra On-Line
- MX Rider (2001), Infogrames
- World's Scariest Police Chases (2001), Activision, Fox Interactive
- The Operative: No One Lives Forever (2000), Fox Interactive
