= Facing Worlds =

Video game map in the Unreal Tournament series

- Unreal Tournament location
- Facing Worlds in Unreal Tournament (1999).
- First appearance: Unreal Tournament
- Created by: Cedric Fiorentino
- Genre: First-person shooter

Facing Worlds, also known by its filename CTF-Face, is a multiplayer map for the first-person shooter video games Unreal Tournament (1999), Unreal Tournament 2003, Unreal Tournament 2004, Unreal Tournament 3, and Unreal Tournament (2014). Consisting of two identical towers separated by a parallel bridge, each team must fight their way into the opposing team's tower and capture their flag. The original Unreal Tournament version of Facing Worlds received critical acclaim, and is widely regarded as one of the greatest first-person shooter maps of all time.

== Design ==
Facing Worlds originally appeared in Unreal Tournament (1999). The map is set in space on a small asteroid in orbit over Earth. As a Capture the Flag map, players are divided into two teams, with each team spawning near a tower containing their team's flag. The towers are connected by a two-lane bridge, with a large gap separating the lanes. The goal of the map is for each team to retrieve the opposing team's flag and deliver it to their own team's tower.

Facing Worlds' creator, Cedric Fiorentino, referred to the map's architecture as "vaguely Mayan but not too recognizable".

== Development ==
Facing Worlds was created by Fiorentino as a test of the Unreal Engine's capabilities. According to Fiorentino, typical Unreal Tournament maps had a limit of 160 polygons visible at the same time, which were split evenly between the landscape and map structures. By contrast, Facing Worlds' development began with Fiorentino allocating all 160 polygons to buildings and leaving the landscape for later. After building the initial tower, Fiorentino duplicated it, linked the towers by a bridge, and began gameplay testing.

As a result of Facing World's polygon budget being exhausted on its dual towers, a traditional landscape was omitted in favor of having the map take place in space, with Fiorentino employing an animated skybox to give the impression that the map is "in a chaotic orbit above the Earth".

"Foregone Destruction", the song that plays ingame within Facing Worlds, was written with minimal collaboration between Fiorentino and the co-composer of Unreal Tournament's soundtrack, Michiel van den Bos, who mostly relied on text explanations of Unreal Tournament when composing its soundtrack, as he did not have appropriate hardware to run the game itself. The song was inspired by Drum 'n' Bass music genre.

== Reception ==
Facing Worlds is frequently listed as one of the greatest multiplayer maps of all time. According to Fiorentino, telemetry for Unreal Tournament revealed that Facing Worlds was played more than all other Capture the Flag levels combined.

Andy Kelly of PC Gamer deemed Facing Worlds "the greatest multiplayer map" in a 2020 retrospective, praising the map for its "beautifully simple design". Speaking of his time playing Facing Worlds at LAN parties, Kevin Wong of Kotaku regarded the map as being "well-designed" and "carefully constructed", and felt that other CTF maps paled in comparison to Facing Worlds. Peter Glagowski of Destructoid commented that "it is hard to understate the mastery of design that is CTF-Face", praising the map for encouraging teamwork and playstyle diversity without sacrificing its simplicity.

== Legacy ==
Facing Worlds has appeared in all subsequent Unreal Tournament games, including Unreal Tournament 2003, Unreal Tournament 2004, Unreal Tournament 3, and Unreal Tournament (2014). Facing Worlds has also been remade as a custom map for other games, such as Counter-Strike: Global Offensive and Halo 5: Guardians. A map from Splitgate, called "Foregone Destruction", is a direct homage to Facing Worlds.

Posters featuring the map can be found inside houses on the island in the later Epic Games release Fortnite Battle Royale, alongside other posters for their titles Jazz Jackrabbit and One Must Fall 2097.
