= Unreal Championship 2: The Liandri Conflict =

2005 video game

- Developer: Epic Games
- Publisher: Midway Games
- Designer: Mike Capps
- Artist: Jerry O'Flaherty
- Composer: Kevin Riepl
- Series: Unreal
- Engine: Unreal Engine 2 (UE2X)
- Platform: Xbox
- Release: NA: April 18, 2005; EU: April 22, 2005
- Genres: First-person shooter, third-person shooter
- Modes: Single-player, multiplayer

Unreal Championship 2: The Liandri Conflict is a first- and third-person arena shooter video game developed by Epic Games and published by Midway Games. It was released in April 2005 for Xbox. The game is part of the Unreal franchise, and is a direct sequel to 2002's Unreal Championship (itself a port of the PC game Unreal Tournament 2003). Unreal Championship 2 was designed from the ground up to take full advantage of the Xbox Live gaming service.

== Gameplay ==
The game's use of third-person perspective when using a melee weapon affords the player greater control in combat.

Unreal Championship 2 features 14 different characters from the Unreal universe, plus extra characters released in a bonus pack via Xbox Live. Other additions include the new gametypes Overdose and Nali Slaughter, new melee weapons, and more adrenaline combos than in previous games.

Unreal Championship 2 adds melee combat to the series by allowing characters to switch to their respective weapon, such as a blade or staff. Players can also perform special "Coup de grâce" moves similar to the Fatalities in Mortal Kombat, another game series by Midway Games. Players can use melee weapons only in third-person mode, but can switch between first- and third-person mode on the fly while using firearms.

Unreal Championship 2 also uses a mechanic that deviates from the standard Unreal Tournament line of games, wherein each character has a designation of light, medium, or heavy, that determines the health, melee weapon damage, movement speed, and agility of the characters. Light characters have the least amount of health and melee weapon damage, but are faster and more agile than the other types. Medium characters are in the middle for all three attributes. Heavy characters have the most life and melee weapon damage, but are the slowest and least agile of the three.

Another addition is the lock-on mechanic, which keeps the locked-on character in front of the player. While it does not center the enemy in front of weapon firing reticules, it does keep the character on the screen until either the player unlocks them, kills or is killed by them, or the locked-on character is out of line of sight. This mechanic helps alleviate the imprecision of analog sticks on the console, as opposed to using a mouse and keyboard on the PC platform, especially when circle strafing and to make melee attacks easier to control.

Adrenaline use is unique to Unreal Championship 2, compared to other Unreal Tournament games. Each character has six adrenaline powers at their disposal. All characters have access to Speed, which grants increased movement speed for a short time, and Nimble, which makes characters float while jumping, and allows for additional jumps beyond the double jump. Each race in the game, human, Nakhti, Necris, Skaarj, Juggernaut, and Liandri robots each have their own race-specific powers. Some characters also have unique adrenaline powers. Adrenaline is gained slowly throughout the match, but is gained faster for kills and killing spree awards. There are also adrenaline pickups on the maps. Each power uses a set amount of adrenaline to activate, ranging from one quarter of the total adrenaline meter, to needing a completely full adrenaline meter to use.

=== Game modes ===
Unreal Championship 2 also has three single-player modes, the Ascension Rites, Tournament mode, and Challenge mode. The Ascension Rites campaign follows a tournament ladder featuring protagonist Anubis as he tries to stop his former fiancée, the power-hungry Selket, from becoming the new Nakhti empress in the Nakhti Ascension Rites. Tournament mode is another tournament ladder mode allowing players to play as different characters in the game through a set number of matches. Challenge mode has players attempting challenges of varying difficulty in single matches. Completing these modes unlocks different mutators and characters for use in multiplayer or bot games.

=== Multiplayer ===
Before a multiplayer game starts, the host can change gravity, regenerate health, and otherwise modify gameplay with "mutators", as is common in the Unreal series of games.

Multiplayer games are eight player maximum games, and can be free for all modes, such as normal deathmatch, or team-based games such as team deathmatch and capture the flag. Unreal Championship 2 shipped with 50 multiplayer maps to play the various modes on, with maps designated for certain gametypes. Although Xbox Live for the original Xbox shut down in 2010, Unreal Championship 2 is now playable on the replacement online servers for the original Xbox called Insignia.

== Plot ==
The story mode has players take the role of Anubis, who left the previous Ascension Rites tournament for the title of Nakhti emperor, and has now become a soldier in the military. He returns to the tournament when he sees his former betrothed, Selket, announcing her intention to win the Ascension Rites tournament after the previous winner has fallen gravely ill and must abdicate the throne. Selket has made a deal with the Liandri Corporation to broadcast the tournament to the rest of the galaxy. Players progress through various modes as Anubis, interspersed with voice acted in-game engine cutscenes that explain more of the story as they make their way through the game.

Eventually, the only two competitors left are Anubis and Selket, with the final match having the respawn mechanics removed for the final kill. Anubis is successful, but is heartbroken that he had to kill the woman he loved. He is then approached by a representative of the Liandri Corporation. They offer him a deal to bring Selket back to life through the Necris Process, so long as he continues to fight in the various tournaments run by the corporation. Anubis reluctantly agrees, saying he doesn't deserve to be the Nakhti emperor. The final scene shows Anubis about to address his people as their new emperor, with a Necrified version of Selket behind him.

== Development ==
Unreal Championship 2 began development after Unreal Tournament 2003 was released, and a planned sequel was in the works for the PC. The title came as a result of a possible console port of Unreal Tournament 2005 (which was instead changed to Unreal Tournament 3 after the branching off). Epic Games decided to move the game over to the consoles, and became a three-game contract between Midway Games and Epic Games. With the Midway publishing deal, Raiden from the Mortal Kombat series of games, which Midway owned before its bankruptcy, was added as an unlockable playable character. Additionally, players could switch from the normal Unreal Tournament male announcer to the announcer from the Mortal Kombat games being published at that time.

The game was built on a custom version of Unreal Engine 2.5, dubbed 'Unreal Engine 2X'. Created specifically for the Xbox console by Epic Games, the engine could push "3-4 times the polygons of the original Unreal Championship game..." and for its time "outperform[ed] most current generation PC games even though they run on much faster CPUs". Part of the reason the game was detailed, and could rival PC games of that time was due to the engine's memory enhancements, which allowed them to reduce the console memory footprint, and manage leaks more efficiently.

=== Soundtrack ===
The soundtrack for Unreal Championship 2 was composed by Kevin Riepl.

== Leak ==
In July 2021, a leak of an unfinished Windows port surfaced online.

== Reception ==
Reception

Aggregate score
Aggregator	Score
Metacritic	85/100

Review scores
Publication	Score
Computer and Video Games	9/10
Edge	8/10
Eurogamer	7/10
GameRevolution	4.5/5
GameSpot	9/10
GamesRadar+	4.5/5
IGN	9.3/10
PopMatters	

Unreal Championship 2 has received a score of 85 of 100 on Metacritic, indicating "generally favorable" reviews.
