= Lotus Creative Entertainment =

Canadian video game development company

- Company type: Private
- Industry: Computer software, video games
- Founded: Vancouver, British Columbia, Canada (2004)
- Headquarters: Vancouver, British Columbia, Canada
- Area served: Worldwide
- Products: Path of Vengeance
- Website: www.lotusnine.com

Lotus Creative Entertainment (formerly known as Lotus Arts) is a Canadian video game development company based in Vancouver, British Columbia, Canada. Founded in 2004 by team lotus, and made famous by the mod Path of Vengeance, which won the Independent Games Festival 2006 Best Unreal Tournament 2004 Modification award.

== Path of Vengeance ==
Path of Vengeance (Chinese: 復仇的路) is a 3rd person action rpg set in the world of Wuxia, during the Three Kingdoms period in ancient China. In an expansive world with breathtaking environments, the player will defy gravity and duel with great elegance, against demons and would-be kings. Path of Vengeance is a total conversion of the Unreal Tournament 2004, with Chinese voice over and English subtitles. It was created over a period of 9 months by about 12 students.
