= Time shift =

Time shift or Timeshift may refer to:

- Timeshift (TV series), a BBC documentary series
- TimeShift, a video game released in 2007
- Time shifting, a form of personal consumer media recording
- Timeshift channel, used in the time-delayed rebroadcasting of television channels
- "Time Shift", an episode of the television series Mona the Vampire
- Timeshift, a free data recovery and backup software for Linux
