= Unreal (video game series) =

- Genre: First-person shooter
- Developers: Epic Games; Digital Extremes; Legend Entertainment
- Publishers: GT Interactive; Infogrames; Atari; Midway Games
- Creators: Cliff Bleszinski; James Schmalz
- Platforms: Microsoft Windows, Mac OS, Linux, Dreamcast, PlayStation 2, Xbox, OS X, PlayStation 3, Xbox 360
- First release: Unreal; May 22, 1998
- Latest release: Unreal Tournament 3 November 19, 2007

Unreal is a series of first-person shooter video games developed by Epic Games. The series is known for its exhibition of the namesake Unreal Engine that powers the games and is available for other developers to license.

Publishing rights for the series have changed hands several times. GT Interactive was the original publisher and would be later succeeded by Infogrames, Atari, and Midway Games.

In 2022, Epic Games made the decision to delist every Unreal game from all major digital storefronts following their move to support their own Epic Online Services, and in 2024 they gave permission for Unreal and Unreal Tournament to be preserved and distributed for free on the Internet Archive.

== Games ==
Titles in the Unreal series
Year	Engine	Title	Platform(s)							
Year	Engine	Title	Win	Mac	Linux	DC	PS2	Xbox	PS3	X360
1998	Unreal Engine 1	Unreal	Yes	Yes	No	No	No	No	No	No
1999	Unreal Engine 1	Unreal Tournament	Yes	Yes	Yes	Yes	Yes	No	No	No
2002	Unreal Engine 2	Unreal Tournament 2003	Yes	Yes	Yes	No	No	No	No	No
2002	Unreal Engine 2	Unreal Championship	No	No	No	No	No	Yes	No	No
2003	Unreal Engine 2	Unreal II: The Awakening	Yes	No	No	No	No	Yes	No	No
2004	Unreal Engine 2	Unreal Tournament 2004	Yes	Yes	Yes	No	No	No	No	No
2005	Unreal Engine 2	Unreal Championship 2: The Liandri Conflict	No	No	No	No	No	Yes	No	No
2007	Unreal Engine 3	Unreal Tournament 3	Yes	No	No	No	No	No	Yes	Yes
2014	Unreal Engine 4	Unreal Tournament	Yes	Yes	Yes	No	No	No	No	No

=== Anthologies ===
- Unreal Anthology (2006) contains Unreal Gold, Unreal Tournament, Unreal II, Unreal Tournament 2004, and a bonus soundtrack CD. Missing from Unreal Tournament are the improved S3TC textures which came with the original release of the game. Also, the internet connectivity of Unreal in this collection is isolated by having a master server different from that of the original game.

== Reception ==
Guinness World Records awarded the series with three world records. These records include, "First Console Game to Receive a Downloadable Patch", "First Console Game to Support Player Modifications" and "First Game to be Created Using the Unreal Engine".
