= Unreal Tournament (cancelled video game) =

2014 first-person shooter video game

- Developer: Epic Games
- Publisher: Epic Games
- Programmers: Steve Polge; Joe Wilcox
- Series: Unreal
- Engine: Unreal Engine 4
- Platforms: Microsoft Windows, macOS, Linux
- Release: Cancelled
- Genre: First-person shooter
- Modes: Single-player, multiplayer

Unreal Tournament is a cancelled first-person arena shooter video game developed by Epic Games. It was planned to be the ninth game in the Unreal franchise, the fifth game in the Unreal Tournament series, and the first entry since 2007's Unreal Tournament 3. The game utilizes Epic's Unreal Engine 4 and was planned for release for free on Microsoft Windows, OS X, and Linux. The game was released as a pre-alpha on August 13, 2014, but never completed due to Epic Games' focus on Fortnite Battle Royale.

Unreal Tournament's development was crowdsourced and open to contribution from anyone with Epic Games using forums for discussions and Twitch livestreams for updates. The source code of the game was published on GitHub but has been removed.

== Gameplay ==
Gameplay remained largely unchanged from past iterations of the Unreal Tournament series. The gametypes were:

- Capture the Flag: Players compete to infiltrate the enemy base, capture the enemy flag and deliver it to their own flag. Competitive teams must use a great deal of teamplay. Both teams must defend their base from incoming attackers and get into the other team's base, take their flag and return it to their base, onto their own flag. This requires that the team protect their flag carrier very well from enemies in order to complete their objective. If the flag carrier is killed, or teleports using a translocator, the flag drops to the ground for anyone to pick up; if a player of the flag carriers team picks it up, they can continue bringing the flag back; if it is the team of the flag, the flag immediately returns to base. If both flags are picked up and in transit at the same time, neither team will be able to score until one of the flag carriers are killed and a flag is returned to base.
- Deathmatch: A classic "every-man-for-himself" player vs. player combat. The objective is to out-frag all opposing players. The player who achieves the frag limit first, wins. Suicidal kills reduce the frag count by one.
- Duel: A one versus one game mode. An addition to the gametype is that when respawning, the player can choose between two random spawnpoints. Typically shares maps with Showdown.
- Showdown: Team game without weapon respawns, where each player picks a spawnpoint before the round starts. Dead players don't respawn and have to wait until the round ends, at which point the surviving team scores. To avoid stalemates, the power-up unique to the game mode, "Overcharge", spawns at 50 seconds before the round time runs out, which grants whoever picks it up double damage, +100 health, and a beacon system for 30 seconds, after which they die. Typically shares maps with Duel.
- Team Deathmatch: Two teams duke it out in a quest for battlefield supremacy. The team with the most total frags wins.
- Blitz: Maps for this gamemode are strongly asymmetrical. Each round is 4 minutes. Defense has 5 lives and an additional 20 seconds to prepare for the match. The offense's goal is to eliminate all defenders or get the flag from their base to the defense's. The offense earns points based on the speed of the objective completion. If the defense holds, they earn one point. To give the offense a chance, at 2 minutes, the Redeemer spawns, allowing the offense to deliver the flag through an impossible defensive line. If the flag gets dropped, every 5 seconds it teleports closer to the attackers' base.

Other gametypes expected to return were:

- Assault: This game type is played with two opposing teams, one assaulting a "base" and the other defending it. The map is set up with a countdown timer and a number of objectives which the attacking team must complete (usually in sequence) such as destroying a power generator, entering an area, triggering a button, etc. The team who first attacks then defends, and attempts to defend for the entire time they attacked. This means one key element: speed. The faster the first team completes their attack, the lesser time they need to defend. If they can defend their base till the last second, they win the map. If the team defending first assaults the base faster than the other team, they win the map. If both teams defend for the maximum amount of time the map is a tie.
- Bombing Run: Each level has a ball that starts in the middle of the playing field. Players score by getting the ball through the enemy team's hoop. They score 7 points for jumping through the hoop while holding the ball, and 3 points for tossing the ball through the hoop. The ball can be passed to teammates, and is dropped if the player carrying it is killed.
- Warfare: Two teams fight a war to destroy the other team's core (which looks like a giant orb) located in their base. To damage the enemy core, the player must first control a series of nodes that link together to form a chain between the two opposing cores. To capture a node controlled by the enemy, he must destroy it with their weapons then touch the platform to create a new node in their color. Nodes behave similarly to unmanned vehicles, in that they can take damage and be repaired using a link gun. When a node has been captured, any nodes connected to it can be captured/destroyed, as well. Once a team controls a chain of nodes leading to the enemy core, players can damage the core by firing on it (the core cannot be repaired), though it requires a lot of damage. The round ends when a team's core has been destroyed. This is similar to the classic "Onslaught" game type, except that Warfare also includes special orbs that players can carry to a node to instantaneously change it over to their team's color (even if the enemy controls it still) with full health, though it still must be linked to one of their nodes. This game type is less popular due to the initial learning curve, but players who have mastered it often report that it is their favorite game type because it offers much more room for strategy than the other game types. Warfare matches usually have vehicles, as well.

== Development ==
Unreal Tournament was first teased in May 2014, when Mark Rein, vice president and co-founder of Epic Games, tweeted about a possible reboot, saying that he loved it, resulting in a positive response from the gaming community, specifically the PC gaming demographic that largely grew up playing the previous games. Paul Meegan, vice president of product development at Epic, followed Rein's tweet with information about the future of Unreal Tournament. The game was announced by Epic in a Twitch livestream on May 8. During the livestream, senior programmer and project lead Steve Polge said that there had been demand for a reboot of the Unreal Tournament and that the release of the Unreal Engine 4 made this the ideal time to do so.

From the very first line of code, the very first art created and design decision made, development will happen in the open, as a collaboration between Epic, UT fans and UE4 developers.

— Steve Polge, writing on the Unreal Engine blog

The development of the game officially began on May 8, the same day of the announcement. Unreal Tournament was developed using Unreal Engine 4 in the open in close collaboration between Epic Games and the community. Although an Unreal Engine 4 subscription was required to fully contribute (all the code was accessible in a GitHub repository), Unreal Tournament fans were still able to comment and share ideas on the company's forum.

During a Twitch livestream held on July 24 the same year, art director Chris Perna showed off a fully rendered but unfinished level in the Unreal Engine editor and talked about the overall look he wanted. A video released five days later via Unreal Tournament's YouTube channel, shows early footage of the game, with the development team playing the first round of Team Deathmatch. It is also taken up by discussions of what the development team is working on. This includes adding in almost all of the weapons and more complex levels.

Screenshot of Outpost 23

A playable pre-alpha build was released on August 13, 2014. Originally, the build was only available to UE4 subscribers but thanks to the way the game is being developed, an Unreal community member was able to compile Epic's prototypes and to release them to the public. According to the development community on the download page, it is stated that the game will receive weekly updates. On September 5, Epic hosted an Unreal Tournament event, where several competitive players and enthusiasts from each generation of Unreal Tournament as well as some of the community contributors were invited to play the early prototype version of the game at Epic's headquarters in Cary, North Carolina. The event was meant for providing feedback on the gameplay.

As part of the announcement that Unreal Engine 4 would be free, a new build of the game was showcased during the 2015 Game Developers Conference, offering its first high-textured map called Outpost 23, which is a new version of the level originally revealed in the game's first-in-engine flythrough in July 2014, a new customized Unreal Editor and new characters.

Two of the original composers of the 1999 Unreal Tournament, Michiel van den Bos and Alexander Brandon, both expressed interest in returning to compose the soundtrack.

The final patch for the game was released on June 28, 2017.

=== Proposed business model ===
While the game was never completed, Epic Games made a number of statements outlining their proposed business model for the title. It was intended to be released for free, reflecting the fact that it was in part created by a community of volunteers, without microtransactions or gameplay-affecting items. To pay for the game, Epic intended to create a marketplace where developers, modders, artists, and players can buy and sell mods and content. Earnings from this marketplace would be split between the content creator and Epic. This model is not dissimilar to the Unreal Engine Marketplace that ultimately emerged in September 2014 for general Unreal Engine projects.

When asked whether the decision to release the game for free was a reflection of a wider industry trend, Steve Polge told Edge: "It's certainly where we are placing our bets and it is our focus at Epic. We like the model because it's fundamentally generous. It allows us to succeed by doing the right thing for the community, and then the value naturally comes back. That's a lot more attractive to us than the old build, ship and pray model".

=== End of development ===
In 2017 Epic Games ceased development on the game after they reallocated its development team to Fortnite Battle Royale after concluding that the game was not pulling in a sustainable player base. A formal announcement of the end of development was made later in December 2018. The game remained available for free in its June 2017 configuration (version 0.1.12) until its servers were shut down on January 24, 2023, rendering it inaccessible in an official capacity.
