= Steve Polge =

Video game programmer

- Occupation: Game programmer

Steven Polge is a game programmer, most noted for his work on Epic Games' Unreal series of games. Polge was hired by Epic in 1997 after creating the Reaper Bot, which is recognized by Guinness World Records as the first computer-controlled deathmatch opponent. In addition to programming on the franchise, he served as lead designer on Unreal Tournament 3, and has been credited on other Epic titles such as Gears of War, Shadow Complex and Fortnite.

Prior to joining Epic, he had worked at IBM after getting his master's degree in computer engineering.

== Video game credits ==
- 1998 – Unreal
- 1999 – Unreal Tournament
- 2002 – Unreal Tournament 2003
- 2002 – Unreal Championship
- 2003 – Unreal II: The Awakening
- 2004 – Unreal Tournament 2004
- 2005 – Unreal Championship 2: The Liandri Conflict
- 2006 – Gears of War
- 2007 – Unreal Tournament 3
- 2009 – Shadow Complex
- 2010 – Infinity Blade
- 2011 – Infinity Blade II
- 2011 – Gears of War 3
- 2011 – Bulletstorm
- 2013 – Gears of War: Judgment
- 2017 – Fortnite
- Cancelled – Unreal Tournament
