= Unreal 3 =

Unreal 3 may refer to:

- Unreal Tournament 3, a multiplayer video game by Epic Games
- Unreal Engine 3, a computer game engine developed by Epic Games
