= Tactical Ops: Assault on Terror =

- European cover art
- Developer: Kamehan Studios
- Publisher: Infogrames (Note: Released under the MicroProse brand name)
- Programmer: Laurent Delayen
- Engine: Unreal Engine 1
- Platform: Windows
- Release: April 24, 2002
- Genre: First-person shooter
- Modes: Single player, multiplayer

Tactical Ops: Assault on Terror is a 2002 first-person shooter video game developed by Kamehan Studios and published by Infogrames as a MicroProse title. The game is a standalone retail version of a multiplayer modification of the same name published by Kamehan Studios in 1999 for the game Unreal Tournament. The game features match-based missions in which two teams, themed as Special Forces and terrorists, battle to complete mission objectives and kill their opponents.

Upon release, Tactical Ops received mixed reviews, with critics faulting the game's similarities to the non-commercial version and lack of defining features compared to other multiplayer first-person shooters.

== Gameplay ==
Tactical Ops is an Unreal Engine game originally released for, and featuring similar gameplay to Unreal Tournament.

Featuring similar gameplay to other team-based multiplayer first-person shooter games, including its original Unreal Engine parent game, Unreal Tournament, Tactical Ops features single-player and multiplayer rounds between two teams, Special Forces and terrorists, with competing objectives, such as to guard or extract hostages or weapons, or detonate bombs in certain locations. The game is played in four-minute deathmatch rounds. If the player is killed during a round, they are required to sit out the round until it ends, either when time lapses or the mission objectives are completed by one team. Players earn money when achieving feats such as killing enemies, finding contraband throughout the level, and completing mission objectives. In between missions, money can be used to acquire new weapons, armor, grenades, and utilities such as night vision goggles. The single-player mode of Tactical Ops allows the player to compete in 30 maps against computer-controlled bots.

== Development ==
Tactical Ops: Assault on Terror originated in 1999 as a modification for Unreal Tournament, first published as SWAT in June 2000 and later updated under the name Tactical Ops by Paris developer Kamehan Studios, led by Laurent Delayen. In 2002, Infogrames secured a publishing deal to release Tactical Ops as a standalone retail title under the Microprose brand, commissioning Kamehan Studios to create a single-player experience for the game. At the time of the deal, over fifty staff were working on the project, including designers, programmers and beta testers. Due to the "unplanned" move to commercial development and the time constraints in the development process, Delayen stated that the project did not include more "deep and complex" scenarios as desired, instead aiming to imitate the multiplayer experience of the modification with computer-controlled bots.

== Reception ==
Reception

Aggregate score
Aggregator	Score
Metacritic	57%

Review scores
Publication	Score
Computer Gaming World	2.5/5
GameSpot	6.2
GameSpy	70%
GameZone	8.0
Hyper	25%
IGN	5.6
PC Gamer (US)	62%
PC Zone	57%

Tactical Ops received "mixed or average" reviews, according to review aggregator website Metacritic, with many critics expressing cynicism on the merit of packaging a modification of Unreal Tournament for commercial release. Many critics also described the game as a "watered-down" imitation or "clone" of existing titles such as Counter-Strike and Global Operations, with Tom Price of Computer Gaming World noting "the whole counter-terrorist themed, close quarters combat genre is oversaturated", and PC Gamer noting the genre was "long in the tooth", giving the game a "been-there-done-that feeling". Describing the game as "far from original" and lacking innovation, IGN nonetheless found Tactical Ops to be an "acceptable alternative" to its counterparts, although its retail version needed "more work".

Reviewers were mixed on the visual presentation and map design of the game. Scott Osborne of GameSpot remarked the updated graphics were a "welcome overhaul", highlighting the "attractive" and "convincing" textures and player skins. GameZone praised the game's "semi-realistic" visual design, level of detail, and lighting. Tom Price of Computer Gaming World stated that the game's models were "uninteresting and barely detailed", featuring "drab textures" and "stiff animation", and with levels "devoid of decent choke points". Mark Hill of PC Zone found the maps to be "boxy, ugly, and unbalanced affairs".

Critics were mixed on the gameplay, although mostly negative on the performance of the bots in the single-player mode. PC Gamer praised the gameplay as "a lot of fun", highlighting the gunfights as "brutal" and the weapons as "semi-realistic". GameZone found the multiplayer mode to be "intense and extremely fast paced". However, Bill Hiles of GameSpy remarked that the multiplayer mode lacked sophistication, devolving to "mob rule and juvenile deathmatch antics", and the single-player mode featured mission types that "lacked in variety". Tom Price of Computer Gaming World described the single-player gameplay as "marred by lackluster bot AI" due to their "predictable behaviour". Similarly, Mark Hill of PC Zone lambasted the bots as "useless" and lacking tactical options, stating "They run to their target, shoot anything that stands in their way and get killed. That's about it."

In response to criticism by reviewers that the terrorism theme of Tactical Ops was in poor or cynical taste following the September 11 attacks, Infogrames publicly clarified that the game "did not seek to glorify terrorism or terrorist activity in any way", and was in production before the attacks occurred.

== See also ==
- List of video games derived from modifications
