= Unreal Championship =

2002 video game

- Developers: Epic Games; Digital Extremes
- Publisher: Infogrames (Note: Released under the Atari brand name.)
- Designer: Cliff Bleszinski
- Programmer: Steve Polge
- Composer: Starsky Partridge
- Series: Unreal
- Engine: Unreal Engine 2
- Platform: Xbox
- Release: NA: November 12, 2002; EU: November 29, 2002
- Genre: First-person shooter
- Modes: Single-player, multiplayer

Unreal Championship is a first-person arena shooter video game developed by Digital Extremes and Epic Games, published by Infogrames, and released for the Xbox. Part of the Unreal franchise, Unreal Championship is the console version of Unreal Tournament 2003, and was developed to take advantage of Xbox Live. The game is notable for being the first ever console game to receive a downloadable patch. In 2003 Unreal Championship was added to the Xbox "Platinum Hits" line.

In line with other online-enabled games on the Xbox, multiplayer on Xbox Live was available to players until 15 April 2010. Unreal Championship is now playable online again on the replacement Xbox servers called Insignia.

A direct sequel, Unreal Championship 2: The Liandri Conflict, was released in 2005.

== Gameplay ==
- Deathmatch
- Team Deathmatch
- Capture the Flag
- Double Domination: In this mode, both teams must control two points on the map for ten seconds in order to score. A point can be taken by walking into its symbol, A or B. NPCs can be ordered to go to a certain point.
- Survival: 1 vs 1 deathmatch with more players than usual. As each round ends, the losing player is made to join a queue of spectators, while the winner remains in the game until killed. The winner is the first player to reach a predetermined score.
- Bombing Run: The player's team must score by placing the ball in the enemy force's goal. The bombing gun regenerates health as the offensive player moves, giving him additional lifespan to reach the enemy goal. Once the enemy goal is reached, the offensive player can run into it to score seven points for their team. Shooting the bomb into the enemy goal earns three points.

== Reception ==
Reception

Aggregate scores
Aggregator	Score
GameRankings	83%
Metacritic	83/100

Review scores
Publication	Score
GameRevolution	4/5
GameSpot	8.5/10
GameSpy	4/5
IGN	9.2/10

The game received "generally favorable" reviews, according to video game review aggregator Metacritic. It was nominated for GameSpot's annual "Best Online Game" and "Best Shooter" awards among Xbox games, both of which went to MechAssault.
