= Unreal Engine 2 =

Game engine

- Release: Unreal Warfare build 633 / January 2001
- Stable release: Unreal Engine 2.5 build 3369 / November 2005
- Written in: C++, UnrealScript
- Platform: Microsoft Windows, Linux, OS X, Xbox, PlayStation 2, GameCube, Wii, PlayStation Portable, Nintendo 3DS
- Predecessor: Unreal Engine 1
- Successor: Unreal Engine 3
- License: Proprietary

Unreal Engine 2 (UE2) is the second version of Unreal Engine developed by Epic Games. Unreal Engine 2 transitioned the engine from software rendering to hardware rendering and brought support for multiple platforms such as video game consoles. The first game using UE2 was released in 2002 and its last update was shipped in 2005. It was succeeded by Unreal Engine 3.

== History ==
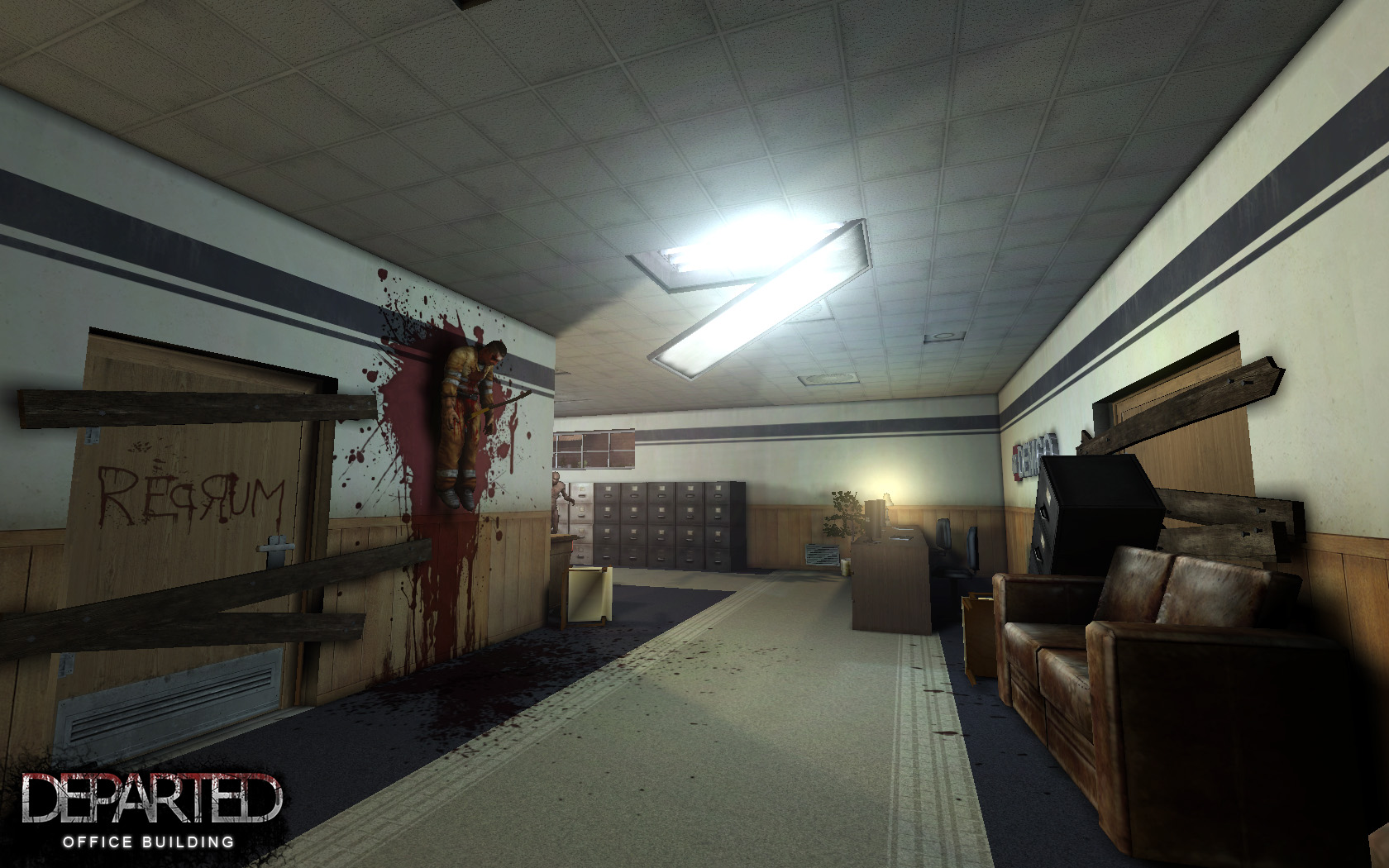
Killing Floor was built in Unreal Engine 2.

In October 1998, IGN reported, based on an interview with its affiliate Voodoo Extreme, that Tim Sweeney, founder of Epic Games, was researching his next-generation engine. With development starting a year later, the second version made its debut in 2002 with America's Army, a free multiplayer shooter developed by the U.S. Army as a recruitment device. Soon after, Epic released Unreal Championship on the Xbox, one of the first games to use Microsoft's Xbox Live.

UE2 saw success through its licensing partnerships, a trend that would continue with later versions. Notable games using the engine included Tom Clancy's Splinter Cell, Deus Ex: Invisible War, EA's Harry Potter games, Red Steel, and BioShock. UE2 could also support varied game genres and styles, with IGN contrasting its use in America's Army with Domestic, an artistic modification of Unreal Tournament 2003 that combined "poetry, cinema, and nostalgia into an interactive first person exploration".

A specialized version of UE2 called UE2X was designed for Unreal Championship 2: The Liandri Conflict on the original Xbox platform, featuring optimizations specific to that console. In March 2011, Ubisoft Montreal revealed that UE2 was successfully running on the Nintendo 3DS via Tom Clancy's Splinter Cell 3D. "The 3DS is powerful, and we are able to run the Unreal Engine on this console, which is pretty impressive for a handheld machine, and the 3D doesn't affect the performance (thanks to my amazing programmers)," said Ubisoft.

Unreal Tournament 2004 introduced a patch of Unreal Engine 2, commonly referred to as Unreal Engine 2.5. UE2 was last updated in 2005 before being replaced by Unreal Engine 3.

== Features ==
=== GPU acceleration ===
The rendering code for UE2 was completely reworked from UE1 and made use of new hardware and graphics APIs such the GeForce 3 series. While UE1 was released before the development of mainstream GPU hardware and only employed software rendering in its initial version, UE2 was designed with GPU acceleration in mind from the beginning.

Software rendering was important to us in games up to Unreal Tournament. Now, we can start looking at GeForces and NV20s as the 'baseline' hardware for our next game. We're really focusing on taking advantage of the hardware 100%.

— Sweeney, Maximum PC, 2001

UE2 was also the first version to make use of DirectX 8, which was released in 2000 and was the first DirectX version to support pixel shaders and vertex shaders, which, according to Sweeney, would allow game developers to "customize every aspect of a game's look and feel–especially animation and realistic lighting." Hardware T&L was used to support larger outdoor environments, which Epic Games' Jack Porter described as being greatly improved in UE2.

=== Multiple platforms ===
While Unreal Tournament was ported to the PlayStation 2 after its release, Unreal Engine 2 was the first version to make multi-platform support an important focus. UE2 supported the PC, PlayStation 2, Xbox, and GameCube. According to IGN, Epic's shift in focus to multi-platform was in anticipation of the larger shift from PC to console development that took place in later years within the video game industry.

=== Other features ===
The engine integrated a variety of features, including a cinematic editing tool, particle systems, export plug-ins for 3D Studio Max and Maya, and a skeletal animation system first showcased in the PlayStation 2 version of Unreal Tournament. In addition, the user interface for UnrealEd was rewritten in C++ using the wxWidgets toolkit, which Sweeney said was the "best thing available" at the time.

Epic used the Karma physics engine, a third-party software from UK-based studio Math Engine, to drive the physical simulations such as ragdoll player collisions and arbitrary rigid body dynamics. With Unreal Tournament 2004, it included improved optimization, improved physics, editor updates, and more particle effects. Vehicle-based gameplay was successfully implemented, enabling large-scale combat. While Unreal Tournament 2003 had support for vehicle physics through the Karma engine, as demonstrated by a testmap with a "hastily-constructed vehicle", it was not until Psyonix created a modification out of Epic's base code that the game received fully coded vehicles. Impressed by their efforts, Epic decided to include it in its successor as an official game mode under the name Onslaught by hiring Psyonix as a contractor. Psyonix would later develop Rocket League before being acquired by Epic in 2019.

== See also ==
Category:Unreal Engine 2 games
