= Unreal Tournament 2004 =

2004 first-person shooter video game

- Developers: Epic Games; Digital Extremes
- Publishers: Atari (Windows); MacSoft (macOS); Epic Games (Steam)
- Producer: Jeff Morris
- Designer: Cliff Bleszinski
- Programmer: Steve Polge
- Composers: Kevin Riepl; Starsky Partridge; Will Nevins
- Series: Unreal
- Engine: Unreal Engine 2
- Platforms: Windows, macOS, Linux
- Release: Windows, Linux: NA: March 16, 2004; EU: March 19, 2004; macOS: NA: March 30, 2004
- Genre: First-person shooter
- Modes: Single-player, multiplayer

Unreal Tournament 2004 (often abbreviated to UT2004) is a first-person arena shooter video game developed by Epic Games and Digital Extremes. Part of the larger Unreal franchise, it is the third game in the Unreal Tournament series and an updated re-release of Unreal Tournament 2003.

Among significant changes to gameplay mechanics and visual presentation, one of the major additions introduced by Unreal Tournament 2004 is the inclusion of vehicles and the Onslaught game type, allowing for large-scale battles.

Unreal Tournament 2004 was released for Windows and Linux systems on March 16, 2004, and for macOS systems on March 30, 2004. It was met with a highly positive reception, with acclaim for its gameplay variety and multiplayer; many critics and publications cited it as one of the strongest first-person shooter games of the year. An expanded edition with additional content was released later in 2004, titled Unreal Tournament 2004: Editor's Choice Edition. A sequel, Unreal Tournament 3, was released on November 19, 2007.

In December 2022, Epic Games chose to remove every game in the Unreal and Unreal Tournament series from all digital storefronts; as a result, Unreal Tournament 2004 became unavailable for digital purchase. All of Epic Games' online servers for the game were later shut down in January 2023. However, in December 2025, the fan group OldUnreal received official permission from Epic Games to re-release Unreal Tournament 2004 as freeware. This free-to-download revival of the game was made publicly available in February 2026 alongside a community patch that introduced numerous updates, such as restored online multiplayer functionality and improved performance on modern systems.

== Plot ==
The game is set in a science fiction universe where humans long before fought a war with an alien species called the Skaarj, leaving their galactic empire in shambles. To assist in the rebuilding of the colonies by calming down enraged colonists, the Liandri Corporation came up with the idea of staging a gladiatorial tournament for the miners. The interest was so high that it grew into a sport, with sponsored teams battling in specially made arenas.

From the beginning, Xan Kriegor, a robot, reigned as champion in the Tournament, until Malcolm, then leading the team Thunder Crash, defeated him and proceeded to merge with the other popular team at the time – the Iron Guard, led by Brock. In last year's Tournament, they were defeated by the Juggernauts, led by gene-boosted monster Gorge.

The game takes place as the Tournament enters its 10th year. Malcolm is back with his old team Thunder Crash and trying to reclaim his title as champion, Brock is back with the Iron Guard and trying for the glory of his own, and Gorge and the Juggernauts are there to defend their title. Additionally, the Skaarj Empire has sent a team of their own to the Tournament in search of honor and glory, and ex-champion Xan Kriegor has had some modifications and is back to return the title where it belongs.

== Gameplay ==
Unreal Tournament 2004 is a first-person shooter (with a toggleable third-person perspective) representing a fast-paced extreme sport of the future. The game, designed primarily for multiplayer gameplay, offers multiple ways of movement including double-jumping, dodge-jumping, wall-dodging and shield-jumping. Unreal Tournament 2004 also features an extensive array of weapons, all of which come with a secondary fire. Some of these weapons, such as the Grenade Launcher and Anti-Vehicle Rocket Launcher (AVRiL), were designed specifically for use in vehicle-based game types, and typically appear only in those game types. More than 100 maps are included in the game for all new and existing game types.

=== Gametypes ===
The available game types are:

- Assault (AS): An objective-oriented game type in which one team attacks the objectives (usually one at a time in a specific order) while another defends. Often, attackers will be rewarded for completing an objective by being allowed to spawn closer to the next objective. If the attacking team completes the final objective within the allowed time, the teams switch roles and another round on the same map begins. If not, the original attackers lose. If a second round begins and the new attackers complete the final objective in less time than the first attackers, they win; if not, they lose.
- Onslaught (ONS): A vehicle-based game mode in which the objective is to capture a series of power nodes connecting the player and their opponents' bases and destroy the power core located within their base. The first team to destroy opponents' power core wins.
- Bombing Run (BR): Each level has a ball that starts in the middle of the playing field. The player's team scores by getting the ball through the enemy team's hoop. The player scores 7 points for jumping through the hoop while holding the ball and 3 points for tossing the ball through the hoop. The player holding the ball cannot use weapons but can pass the ball to teammates. The ball is dropped if the player is killed.
- Capture the Flag (CTF): The player's team must score flag captures by taking the enemy flag from the enemy base and returning it to their own flag. If the flag carrier is killed, the flag drops to the ground for anyone to pick up. If the player's team's flag is taken, it must be returned (by touching it after it is dropped) before their team can score a flag capture.
- Deathmatch (DM): A game type where the goal is to either reach a specified number of frags (kills), or to reach the highest number of frags within the allotted time limit for the match.
- Team Deathmatch: Two teams duke it out in a quest for battlefield supremacy. The team with the most frags wins.
- Invasion: A simple survival mode. The players are forced to work together to try and survive endless waves of monsters from Unreal that get increasingly difficult with each wave. Once a player dies they cannot respawn until the round is over. Rounds can either end after a time limit (victory) or when all players are dead (failure).
- Double Domination (DOM): The player's team scores by capturing and holding both Control Points for ten seconds. Control Points are captured by touching them. After scoring, the Control Points are reset to neutral.
- Last Man Standing: Each player starts with a limited number of lives. The last remaining player to still have lives wins the match.
- Mutant: All players start in a Deathmatch setting with all weapons, and the first player to kill becomes the "mutant". This player receives unlimited ammo, camouflage, Berserk (which increases rate of fire and knockback), and super speed for an indefinite amount of time, but they slowly lose health and cannot pick up any health items. When the mutant is killed, the mutant powers are passed to the killer.

=== Characters ===
Unreal Tournament 2004 features 90 different playable characters (some of which are simple palette swaps of each other), including humans, aliens, robots, cyborgs, and more; six of these characters (Mekkor, Skrilax, Barktooth, Karag, Kragoth, and Thannis) were added to the roster with the Editor's Choice Edition of the game. Many characters return from Unreal Tournament 2003 and its Xbox port Unreal Championship, while others are brand new additions. Each playable character in the game is aligned with a specific team or faction within the fictional Tournament and given their own unique description and statistics. AI bot behavior in single-player modes also includes specific weapon preferences for each individual character, adding an extra layer to gameplay variety.

Following his absence from both Unreal Tournament 2003 and Unreal Championship, Unreal Tournament 2004 notably reintroduced the robotic former Tournament champion Xan Kriegor, the final boss of the first Unreal Tournament game's single-player mode. Like in the original game, Xan can be unlocked as a playable character if the player faces and defeats him at the end of the single-player Tournament mode. Two other team leaders in the Unreal Tournament 2004, Malcolm and the Skaarj Clan Lord, are also unlockable like Xan; depending on how the Tournament mode is played, the player may face any one of these three opponents to become champion.

=== Vehicles ===
There are many vehicles available in Unreal Tournament 2004. Most of them make an appearance in the Onslaught game type, while a few feature in Assault. The full set consists of different types of ground-based vehicles and aircraft. Like each weapon in the game, most of Unreal Tournament 2004's vehicles also possess two different abilities. Some vehicles can only be used by one player, while others seat multiple players simultaneously, thus encouraging cooperative team play. There are also two spacecraft which only officially feature in one Assault map (AS-Mothership) and different types of gun turrets which players can take control of. Controllable vehicles and turrets can often be slowly repaired by players using the secondary fire mode of the Link Gun (an energy weapon commonly found in both smaller game modes and larger, vehicle-based modes), though this repair feature still consumes the weapon's ammunition.

== Development ==
Screenshot of the Onslaught map ONS-Dria

Unreal Tournament 2004 was built with Unreal Engine 2.5 and the content of its predecessor, Unreal Tournament 2003. The game was developed by multiple studios, with Epic Games leading the project. Lead programmer Steve Polge described the role of each company involved:

Epic Games
Enhancements to the Unreal Tournament 2003 game types, the new user interface, voice over IP and bot voice command support, engine enhancements and optimizations. They made an improved single-player game, and improved community and demo recording support, in addition to thirty-one new playable characters. The Sniper Rifle, similar to the one included in the original Unreal Tournament, was added. They created one Onslaught map and developed AI support for Onslaught. Sixteen Deathmatch maps, five Capture the Flag maps, two Double Domination maps and one Bombing Run map were added. The Assault gametype design and implementation were also reintroduced from the original Unreal Tournament.
Digital Extremes
Three Deathmatch maps, six Capture the Flag maps, two Bombing Run maps, and three Double Domination maps, two playable characters, a new HUD design; weapon models for the Assault Rifle, Shock Rifle, and Link Gun.
Psyonix
The Onslaught gametype design and implementation, with six vehicles, four weapons (Grenade Launcher, Spider Mine Layer, Anti-Vehicular Rocket Launcher (AVRiL), and the Phoenix Target Painter), and the energy turret. They created seven Onslaught maps and collaborated with Streamline Studios on the popular map ONS-Torlan. They made the model for the Translocator, a portable teleporter.
Streamline Studios
The single-player introduction movie and ONS-Torlan in collaboration with Psyonix. Streamline Studios created the Assault map AS-Confexia as a test for ONS-Torlan, which they released for free.

== Release ==
A playable demo was released for multiple platforms in February 2004, including Microsoft Windows, macOS, Linux on x86-32, and Linux on x86-64. An updated demo version, including all the bug fixes from official patches and some original content, was released on September 23 of the same year.

After being delayed from a late 2003 release, Unreal Tournament 2004 was released in March 2004 in North America and Europe, for the PC (Linux x86-32/x86-64 and Windows). At release, the game could be purchased as a standard six-disc CD-ROM release or a special edition DVD-ROM release that included a Logitech microphone headset and a second DVD filled with video tutorials on how to use the included UnrealEd. The European DVD release did not include the bonus extras. A DVD-ROM release without the microphone followed suit in the United States on April 13. All original PC versions of the game included a $10 mail-in rebate requiring that a short form be completed and sent to the publisher along with a copy of the manual cover for Unreal Tournament 2003, although in Europe the rebate required sending in the play CD for Unreal Tournament 2003 instead. The macOS version (DVD only) followed on March 31.

An official 192-page Prima Games strategy guide for Unreal Tournament 2004, written by David S. J. Hodgson, was published on March 23, 2004 to coincide with the game's release. The book explains a wide variety of different topics related to the game, such as general gameplay basics, tips and tricks, characters, vehicles, and in-depth map overviews. It also includes a full list of usable commands and cheat codes.

== Post-release ==
=== Updates and DLC ===
In summer 2004, Epic and Atari, in collaboration, released an XP Levels downloadable map pack, which included two Onslaught maps, ONS-Ascendancy and ONS-Aridoom. The pack is free for download and use on any system capable of running the game.

In September 2004, Atari released in stores Unreal Tournament 2004: Editor's Choice Edition, which adds three vehicles, four Onslaught maps, and six character skins to the original game, and contains several mods developed by the community as selected by Epic Games. This extension (excluding mods) was released as a Bonus Pack by Atari on September 23, and is available for free download.

The version for Windows x86-64 was released as a downloadable patch on October 1, 2005.

In December 2005, the Mega Bonus Pack was released online by Epic Games, which included several new maps, along with the latest patch and the Editor's Choice Edition content.

In June 2006, Midway Games acquired the publishing rights to the Unreal back catalog from Infogrames and Atari. That November, Midway released Unreal Anthology, a bundle that includes Unreal Gold, Unreal II: The Awakening, Unreal Tournament: Game of the Year Edition, and Unreal Tournament 2004.

In March 2008, Epic Games released the game on Valve's digital distribution service Steam, and was also included as part of the Unreal Deal Pack, followed later in the year by the Editor's Choice Edition on GOG.com.

Subsequent Midway editions of Unreal Tournament 2004 omit the Linux installer from DVD game content.

=== Shutdown and subsequent revival ===
On December 14, 2022, Epic Games announced via a news update on their official website that they would immediately begin shutting down the online services for several older titles from their game catalog, including Unreal Tournament 2004 (and all other entries in the Unreal and Unreal Tournament series); additionally, these games would be delisted from digital storefronts. The news post further clarified that the ability to purchase any available in-game downloadable content for these titles would also be disabled. Epic provided reasoning for their decision, stating that moving forward, they wish to "solely support Epic Online Services with its unified friends system, voice chat features, parental controls, and parental verification features." The Steam version of Unreal Tournament 2004 was delisted the same day that Epic's news update was published, while the GOG.com version was delisted the following week on December 23. The original Epic Games online servers for Unreal Tournament 2004 were later shut down on January 24, 2023.

In December 2025, the fan community OldUnreal announced that due to Epic Games' permission, Unreal Tournament 2004 was in the process of being revived as a free download with updated optimization for modern systems. Shortly after its announcement, initial patch notes were posted online by community members involved with the project. The OldUnreal re-release of Unreal Tournament 2004 (specifically the Editor's Choice Edition) was made available for download via the Internet Archive in February 2026 and included the community's first new patch for the game. Among numerous changes and quality-of-life improvements, the patch featured enhanced compatibility with 64-bit operating systems, widescreen support, and the return of a functioning in-game server browser, therefore restoring the ability to play online multiplayer. The OldUnreal patch can also be separately downloaded by any players who already own a physical or digital copy of Unreal Tournament 2004, allowing anyone to update any edition of the game to the latest enhanced version.

== Music ==
The soundtrack for Unreal Tournament 2004 was composed by Kevin Riepl, Starsky Partridge, and Will Nevins. It features a diverse assortment of musical genres and subgenres, including grand orchestral scores, hard rock, ambient music, electronic dance music, and minimalistic electronic songs. The game also includes almost all music tracks from Unreal Tournament 2003. Furthermore, by using the Unreal Editor application included with Unreal Tournament 2004, players can freely change the music files utilized by each individual map in the game or add their own custom tracks.

== Modification ==
Unreal Tournament 2004 includes extensive modification support which allows users to easily create maps, models, game modes as well as various other additions to the game; the game's installed files include Unreal Editor (UnrealEd) Version 3.0, a level editor which can be used for a variety of purposes, ranging from small edits to fully custom creations. The game features a flexible modification system which seamlessly blends custom content with the original, and also allows for easy tweaking of gameplay features via the "mutator" system.

In 2004, Epic Games held the "Make Something Unreal Contest", which rewarded the creators of the best-submitted modifications with prizes in cash, computer hardware, and, ultimately, a license for commercial use of Unreal Engine 2 and 3. Red Orchestra, a total conversion modification based on the Eastern Front of World War II and focused on realism-oriented gameplay, was the winner of the contest and is currently available as a retail title on Steam.

Alien Swarm was the winner of Phase 4 of the Make Something Unreal Contest for best non-first-person shooter modification. In 2010, the game was released as a standalone game for free, based on the Source engine instead of the Unreal Engine.

Killing Floor was originally a total conversion mod for the game Unreal Tournament 2004, first released in 2005. The retail release followed on May 14, 2009. Its sequels, Killing Floor 2 and Killing Floor 3, were released in 2016 and 2025 respectively.

The developers of the acclaimed 2003 game modification Deathball were awarded grant money from Epic to develop Supraball in 2014.

The game served as a platform for the Computer game bot Turing Test competition, also known as BotPrize.

== Reception ==
Reception

Aggregate scores
Aggregator	Score
GameRankings	94% (50 reviews)
Metacritic	93/100 (48 reviews)

Review scores
Publication	Score
1Up.com	9/10
Computer Gaming World	5/5
Computer and Video Games	9.4/10
Eurogamer	9/10
Game Informer	9.5/10
GamePro	5/5
GameRevolution	A−
GameSpot	9.4/10
GameSpy	5/5
GamesRadar+	4/5
IGN	9.4/10
PC Gamer (US)	92/100
X-Play	5/5

Upon release, Unreal Tournament 2004 was met with universal acclaim. Several critics praised the unique, fast-paced, fun and challenging nature of the game as its main selling points, while fans touted the post-release support and extensive modding capabilities. The game holds a score of 94% on GameRankings and a score of 93/100 on Metacritic. As of 2026, Unreal Tournament 2004 remains the highest-rated game in the Unreal series on Metacritic, scoring a single point higher than the PC release of the original Unreal Tournament.

GameSpot named Unreal Tournament 2004 the best computer game of March 2004. It received runner-up placements in GameSpot's 2004 "Best Shooter" and "Best Multiplayer Game" award categories across all platforms, losing to Half-Life 2 and Halo 2, respectively. It was a runner-up for Computer Games Magazine's list of 2004's top 10 computer games, but it won the magazine's "Best Multiplayer" award.

During the 8th Annual Interactive Achievement Awards, Unreal Tournament 2004 received nominations for "Computer First-Person Action Game of the Year" and "Outstanding Achievement in Online Gameplay".

In March 2014, GamesRadar ranked Unreal Tournament 2004 as the 70th best game on their "Top 100 Best Video Games of All Time" list.

=== Awards ===
List of awards
Publication	Category	Result	Ref.
Computer Gaming World	Shooter (Multiplayer) of the Year	Won	
IGN	Best Multiplayer Game	Won	
GameSpy	Best Multiplayer Game	Won	
Apple Design Awards	Best Mac OS X Entertainment Product	Won	
