= Unreal Tournament 3 =

2007 first-person shooter video game

- Developer: Epic Games
- Publisher: Midway Games
- Producers: Jeffrey Kennedy Morris; Michael V. Capps
- Designers: Steve Polge; Jim Brown; David Ewing
- Programmer: Steve Polge
- Artists: Jerry O'Flaherty; Shane Caudle; Paul David Jones
- Writer: Michael V. Capps
- Composers: Jesper Kyd; Rom Di Prisco; Kevin Riepl
- Series: Unreal
- Engine: Unreal Engine 3
- Platforms: Microsoft Windows, PlayStation 3, Xbox 360
- Release: Microsoft Windows: NA: November 19, 2007; EU: November 23, 2007; AU: November 29, 2007; PlayStation 3: NA: December 10, 2007; AU: February 21, 2008; EU: February 22, 2008; Xbox 360: AU: July 3, 2008; EU: July 4, 2008; NA: July 7, 2008
- Genre: First-person shooter
- Modes: Single-player, multiplayer

Unreal Tournament 3 (UT3) is a first-person arena shooter video game developed by Epic Games and published by Midway Games. Part of the Unreal franchise, it is the fourth game in the Unreal Tournament series, and the eighth game of the franchise overall. Its title refers to the game being the first in the franchise to use Unreal Engine 3. It was released on November 19, 2007, for Microsoft Windows, December 10, 2007, for the PlayStation 3 in North America, and on July 3, 2008, for the Xbox 360 in Australia. OS X and Linux ports were planned, but they were eventually cancelled. A free-to-play version, entitled Unreal Tournament 3 X, was leaked in late 2022 and cancelled in the following year.

Similar to its predecessors, Unreal Tournament 3 is primarily an online multiplayer title. There are eight modes of play: Deathmatch, Team Deathmatch, Capture the Flag, Duel, Warfare, Vehicle Capture the Flag, Betrayal and Greed. In vehicle maps, the player is equipped with a hover board, which allows the player to quickly traverse large maps and grapple onto other teammates' vehicles. The game's single-player campaign does not follow a plot based around the eponymous tournament, but rather a Necris attack on the Twin Souls colony on Taryd, an Earth-like planet, which unleashes bloodthirsty Krall on the humans.

The game received positive reviews from critics, and sold more than 1 million copies worldwide.

== Gameplay ==
Similar to the prior entries in the series, the game is primarily an online multiplayer title offering several game modes, including large-scale Warfare, Capture the Flag, and Deathmatch. It also includes an extensive offline multiplayer game with an in-depth story, beginning with a simple tournament ladder and including team members with unique personalities. The following game modes are included:

- Deathmatch
- Team Deathmatch
- Capture the Flag
- Duel – a one versus one game mode, it uses a queuing system: the winner stays, and the loser goes back to the end of the queue. A typical match lasts fifteen minutes with the winner being the player with the most kills.
- Warfare – a mix of Onslaught and Assault game modes. While basic game rules are equal to those of Onslaught, Warfare adds countdown nodes (which, after being captured and defended for a certain period of time, create a vehicle or trigger an event helpful to the capturing team) as well as the orb, which can be used to instantly capture and defend nodes.
- Vehicle Capture the Flag – Capture the Flag, with vehicles as part of the map; this game mode is distinct from the standard Capture the Flag mode. Also, players are given a hoverboard rather than a translocator.
- Betrayal – this game type places freelance players on teams, and when the members of each team kill enemies, the pot for that team grows. Anybody on a team with a pot can betray the rest of the team by shooting them, thus taking the pot, but they must defend themselves from the betrayed teammates for 30 seconds after that, or the teammates receive extra points.
- Greed – named after the UT2004 mod of the same name, it focuses on collecting skulls dropped from dead players and capturing them in the opposing team's base. For Greed, the game uses all Capture the Flag and Vehicle Capture the Flag maps.

Modes not returning from the prior Unreal Tournament games include Invasion, Mutant (having been later on partially replaced by the Titan mutator in the UT3 Titan Pack), Onslaught (replaced by Warfare), Bombing Run, Last Man Standing, Domination, and Double Domination. Assault was removed from the game during production.

In this installment of Unreal Tournament, the vehicles are split into two factions, the Axon vehicles and Necris vehicles. The Axon vehicles are the same vehicles from Unreal Tournament 2004, but several have significant game play changes. In addition, on vehicle maps every player is equipped with a personal hover board, a skateboard-like device that allows players to quickly traverse large maps and grapple onto other teammates' vehicles. The hover board is vulnerable to attack, and any hit will knock the player off the board and disable him or her for several seconds, leaving the player exposed and vulnerable. The player cannot use any weapons while on the board.

== Plot ==
Unlike the prior Unreal Tournament games, the single-player campaign does not follow a plot based around the Tournament Grand Championship, and therefore several of the teams within Unreal Tournament 3 are not Tournament competitors. The five playable factions are: the Iron Guard, a team of human mercenaries affiliated with the Axon; the Ronin, a band of four survivors of a Skaarj attack on a human colony; Liandri studius, a series of advanced humanoid robots custom-built or retrofitted for combat; the Krall, a warlike race of aliens formerly under the leadership of the Skaarj, returning from their initial appearance in the original Unreal; and the Necris, warriors who have undergone the process of the same name, making them stronger at the expense of replacing their biological processes with "Nanoblack", effectively turning them into undead soldiers (hence the name, Necris). In the Campaign, players control members of the Ronin, and the Necris serve as the chief antagonists.

In the game's story, a Necris attack occurs on the Twin Souls colony of Taryd, an Earth-like planet, releasing bloodthirsty reptilian Krall on the humans. The colony is defenseless, but a group of soldiers called 'Ronin' arrive on the scene, defending the survivors. Reaper, the group's leader, is caught in the explosion of an incoming rocket and passes out, but not before seeing an unknown Necris woman, revealed to be Necris High Inquisitor Akasha, executing a wounded soldier next to him. Reaper is rescued by Othello and Jester and wakes up in the base of the Izanagi, a megacorporation with a large private army, and meets with their leader Malcolm, a celebrated former tournament champion. Malcolm promises Reaper and the rest of Ronin that if they join the Izanagi, they will take the fight to the Necris and avenge the massacre of Twin Souls.

The missions of the campaign are identical to multiplayer matches, with the only difference being the enemies are computer-controlled bots instead of human players. The Izanagi pits Ronin against the Axon in a campaign to seize their vehicle technology, and then begins a campaign against the Liandri to seize their rich Tarydium mines, both of which are required for sustaining a war against the Necris. Shortly after this, the Necris launch a surprise invasion of Taryd, destroying cities and massacring civilians. The Necris are seen deploying tentacle-like tubes carrying Nanoblack into the planet's surface from orbit, in order to terraform the entire world. The Izanagi then mount a counterattack, and Ronin is sent on several missions to push the Necris back. After successfully repelling the Necris assault and ending the invasion, Reaper and the rest of Ronin decide to break ranks and pursue the Necris to their homeworld, Omicron-6, in an effort to kill Akasha for good.

Finally cornering Akasha in her last sanctuary on Omicron-6, Reaper defeats her in a duel and kills her with his rocket launcher. However, it is revealed that Malcolm has betrayed Ronin, allowing Necris troops to surround and kill Jester, Bishop, and Othello. Reaper swears revenge on Malcolm before powering up his rocket launcher and leaping to attack the Necris.

== Development and release ==
The game was announced in May 2005, as Unreal Tournament 2007 for a 2006 release, but the game was delayed until the first half of 2007. The game was renamed to Unreal Tournament 3. The original Unreal Tournament uses the first Unreal Engine, while UT2003 and UT2004 use Unreal Engine 2. Since 2004 incorporates all of the content from 2003, they are regarded as part of the same generation. UT3 is the third generation, as it runs on Unreal Engine 3 and does not reuse any content. The game also uses motion blur effects.

=== Windows version ===
A limited collector's edition of the game features an exclusive collector's edition tin and a hardcover art book. A bonus DVD is also included, featuring more than twenty hours of Unreal Engine 3 tool kit video tutorials, the history of the Unreal Tournament series, and behind-the-scenes footage of the making of Unreal Tournament 3. The Limited Collector's Edition was sold in the United States, Canada, Latin America, Europe, South Africa, Australia and most other territories.

=== PlayStation 3 version ===
The PlayStation 3 version supports community-made mods that can be uploaded and downloaded to the PS3's HDD or external media, as well as mouse and keyboard inputs. The 1.1 patch was released in March 2008. It adds the ability for players using the North American and European versions to play together, fixes problems with some USB headsets, and displays the lowest pinging servers at the top of the server list. Some updates are only applied on the North American version, since the PAL version released in March 2008 was already partially updated. The 2.0 patch was released in March 2009, and adds better PC mod support, split screen, smarter AI, forty-eight obtainable Trophies, server-side improvements, an improved map vote, local multiplayer, and a new user interface. Online and LAN multiplayer for this version was terminated in July 2014, following the shutdown of all GameSpy servers.

=== Xbox 360 version ===
Upon release, the Xbox 360 version had five exclusive maps, two exclusive characters, a two-player split screen mode, and all the downloadable content released by Epic already on the disc. With the release of the PS3 and PC "Titan Upgrade" patch on March 5, these versions offered the formerly exclusive Xbox 360 content, as well as other content. The Xbox 360 version does not support user-generated mods, as additional content has to be verified by Microsoft before being released. It is the only version to support controllers only.

=== Cancelled Linux and Mac OS X versions ===
The Linux and Mac OS X versions of the game were planned to be released as downloadable installers that work with the retail disc. Ryan C. Gordon has uploaded screenshots of the game, dating from September 2008, running on both platforms. In May 2009, Ryan stated that the UT3 port for Linux was still in process, but later in December 2010, Steve Polge revealed that the Linux port would never be released, making it the second Unreal Tournament game not to be released on Linux.

=== Soundtrack ===
Unreal Tournament 3: The Soundtrack is primarily based on the original Unreal Tournament score, which was composed by Straylight Productions and Michiel van den Bos. Jesper Kyd and Rom Di Prisco remixed many of UT99's tracks and composed several other original tracks, which were released on November 20, 2007, by Sumthing Else. Sandhya Sanjana was featured as a guest vocalist. Kevin Riepl did also contribute in music production for the game, scoring the cutscenes as well as a few in-game music tracks.

=== Titan Pack and Black Edition ===
A free update titled Titan Pack was released for the PC in March 2009; the PS3 version of the pack was released on March 19. The pack includes five maps and two characters that were formerly exclusive to the Xbox 360 version, along with eleven brand-new maps, two new game modes ("Greed" and "Betrayal"), and the Titan Mutator. The Titan Mutator causes a player to grow in size as they do better, while carrying alternative weapons and power-ups. The expansion also includes a new power-up, a new vehicle, two new deployables, and the addition of stinger turrets. A new patch was also released in conjunction with the Titan Pack, which allowed for various AI improvements (especially in vehicle modes), networking performance upgrades and added support for Steam Achievements (PC) and Trophies (PS3). It also adds a two-player split screen mode (formerly exclusive to the 360 version) and mod browsing for the PS3 version.

The Black Edition is a complete Unreal Tournament 3 package—included is the complete UT3 (with patch 2.0) as well as the Titan Pack.

=== Unreal Tournament 3 X ===
The game's online servers for the Windows version were shut down in January 2023, in order to focus on supporting the Epic Online Services. In December 2022, a free-to-play version, entitled Unreal Tournament 3 X, was leaked on Steam, meaning that the game would be using the Epic Online Services and full cross-play between Steam, GOG.com, and the Epic Games Store, with the latter platform being added when it released. Epic Games was to self-publish this version, and was slated for a 2023 release, but the development of this version was cancelled and the Steam page was reverted to its original name without any announcement.

== Reception ==
Reception

Aggregate scores
Aggregator	Score
GameRankings	PC: 83% PS3: 86% X360: 83%
Metacritic	PC: 83/100; PS3: 86/100; X360: 82/100

Review scores
Publication	Score
Computer and Video Games	8.9/10
Edge	8/10
Eurogamer	PC: 8/10; PS3: 9/10
GameSpot	PC: 8.5/10; PS3: 8.5/10; X360: 8/10
GamesRadar+	4/5
GameZone	X360: 8.5/10
Giant Bomb	X360: 3/5
IGN	PC: 9/10; PS3: 9/10; X360: 8.5/10
The Guardian	X360: 4/4
PC Advisor	4/5
PC Pro	5/6
Thunderbolt	PC: 6/10

Unreal Tournament 3 received positive reviews from critics. Xbox Magazine rated it 8.5 out of 10. PlayStation: the Official Magazine gave it 5 stars out of 5 in its February 2008 issue, commending the game for graphics and gameplay. By March 2008, UT3 had sold over a million copies worldwide.
