= Unreal Tournament =

1999 first-person shooter video game

- Developers: Epic Games (Note: Ported to Mac OS by Westlake Interactive, to Linux by Loki Software, and to Dreamcast by Secret Level, Inc.); Digital Extremes
- Publishers: GT Interactive (Win); Epic Games (Linux); MacSoft (Mac OS); Infogrames (PS2/Dreamcast)
- Designers: Cliff Bleszinski; James Schmalz
- Programmers: Tim Sweeney; Steve Polge; Erik de Neve; Jack Porter; Brandon Reinhart
- Artist: Shane Caudle
- Composers: Straylight Productions; Michiel van den Bos
- Series: Unreal
- Engine: Unreal Engine 1
- Platforms: Windows, Linux, Mac OS, PlayStation 2, Dreamcast
- Release: November 22, 1999: Windows; NA: November 22, 1999; EU: December 3, 1999 Linux; WW: November 23, 1999 Mac OS; NA: January 17, 2000 PlayStation 2; NA: October 26, 2000; EU: April 20, 2001 Dreamcast; NA: March 13, 2001; EU: June 29, 2001
- Genre: First-person shooter
- Modes: Single-player, multiplayer

Unreal Tournament is a 1999 first-person shooter game developed by Epic Games and Digital Extremes. The second installment in the Unreal series, it was first published by GT Interactive in 1999 for Windows, and later released on the PlayStation 2 and Dreamcast by Infogrames in 2000 and 2001, respectively. Players compete in a series of matches of various types, with the general aim of out-killing opponents. The PC and Dreamcast versions support multiplayer online or over a local area network. Free expansion packs were released, some of which were bundled with a 2000 re-release: Unreal Tournament: Game of the Year Edition.

Powered by the Unreal Engine, Unreal Tournament received universal acclaim, often being considered one of the greatest video games ever made, with reviewers praising the graphics, level design and gameplay, though the console ports were noted for having limitations. The design of the game shifted the series' focus to competitive multiplayer action with the releases of sequels Unreal Tournament 2003 in 2002, Unreal Tournament 2004 in 2004, and Unreal Tournament 3 in 2007.

In 2014, a pre-alpha version of a new game in the series was released titled simply Unreal Tournament, with the source code being freely available, but in 2017 Epic Games ceased development on it after they reallocated its development team to Fortnite Battle Royale, and a formal announcement of the end of its development was made later in December 2018.

== Gameplay ==
A typical game of Domination in progress

Unreal Tournament is an arena first-person shooter, with head-to-head multiplayer deathmatches being the primary focus of the game. The single-player campaign is a series of arena matches played with bots, where the player competes for the title of Grand Champion. The player moves up the tournament ladder in order to challenge the current champion, Xan Kriegor, a mysterious being with exceptional skill. Also available is a practice mode, in which, as its name implies, the player practices a match. Match settings (such as score and time limits) can be customized. Also available are "mutators", which drastically alter gameplay aspects, such as "InstaGib", which makes players compete with instant-kill Shock Rifles instead of the normal weapons. Weapons include the Enforcer, the Rocket Launcher and the Ripper, which fires ricocheting blades. Each weapon has two firing modes which have different effects: for example, Rippers can also fire non-ricocheting blades that explode on impact. A special weapon is the Redeemer, which fires a miniature nuke and causes a large and powerful explosion.

Items such as body armor (which reduces damage taken), health packs (which heal players) and damage amplifiers are scattered across levels. Levels are set in a variety of environments, including spaceships, outposts and buildings like castles and monasteries. Many contain features such as elevators (lifts) and teleporters and obstacles such as water and lava. The game is backwards compatible with the majority of Unreal multiplayer maps. The PC version includes a level editor in which players can create their own levels, and the PlayStation 2 version supports the use of a USB keyboard and mouse, enabling players to play in a similar manner to the PC version.

For team matches, bots are used to fill the roles of the player's teammates. The player can choose the bots' skill level or have it automatically adjust to the player's performance. Bots can be further customized by changing attributes such as names, appearance and weapon preferences. In team matches, players can give orders to bots on their team. The PC version supports multiplayer mode over the internet or a local area network (the original Unreal was mainly a single-player game).

=== Game types ===
- Assault: This game type is played with two teams, one assaulting a "base" and the other defending it. The map is set up with objectives that the attacking team must complete (usually in sequence) such as shutting down a power generator, or entering an area. The team who first attacks then defends, and attempts to defend for the entire time they attacked. If they accomplish this, they win. If the team defending first assaults the base faster than the other team, they win. If both teams defend for the maximum amount of time the match is a tie. The Dreamcast version does not feature this mode.
- Capture the Flag: Players compete to capture the other team's flag and return it to their base. Competitive teams must use a great deal of teamplay. Both teams must defend the base from incoming attackers and get into the other team's base, take their flag and return to base.
- Deathmatch: A classic free-for-all player vs. player combat, the objective is to out-kill all opposing players.
- Domination: Two teams compete to control various control points to earn points. Standard maps contain three control points. Control of these points is initially accomplished through occupation (physically occupying the space), but control of a point continues until a player from another team occupies the space. The first team to reach the point limit, or that has the most points when a time limit has expired, wins.
- Last Man Standing: Similar to Deathmatch, the player's objective is to remain alive longer than their opponents, putting an emphasis on number of deaths rather than kills. Players start with all weapons (except the Redeemer) fully loaded and have a set number of lives. Power-ups, including health and ammunition packs, are unavailable. Once a player runs out of lives, they lose.
- Team Deathmatch: Up to four teams compete to out-kill the opposing teams.

Four "bonus packs" were released, each adding maps, characters, or features. For example, Bonus Pack 1 adds "relics" as mutators. Relics are special items that grant a significant advantage to their holder. They include (but are not limited to), the Relic of Vengeance, which creates an explosion when its holder dies, the Relic of Regeneration, which regenerates the health of the holder, and the Relic of Redemption, which makes its holder respawn elsewhere with full health and weapons intact when they would normally die. Bonus Pack 4 adds a new version of Xan Kriegor.

== Plot ==
During the Human–Skaarj war, the New Earth Government was formed. Mining was the primary method of financing the war, but was unpopular with the working class, who grew weary of the working conditions and the war. The humans were losing the war, and riots broke out. The Terran system was surrounded by Skaarj forces, but a government team destroyed their mothership, and the Skaarj withdrew. Afterward, revolts and violence among the mining colonies were on the increase, and efforts to deal with them were unsuccessful. The government then came up with the idea of giving the violence an outlet instead. "Consensual murder" was legalized in the year 2291, enabling people to fight to the death under organized conditions. The Liandri Mining Corporation worked with the government and organized leagues and public exhibitions. Soon, these matches became more profitable than mining, and Liandri formed a professional league to compete in a "Grand Tournament", the most popular event in the sport. The game takes place in 2341, fifty years after the fights were first legalized.

== Development ==
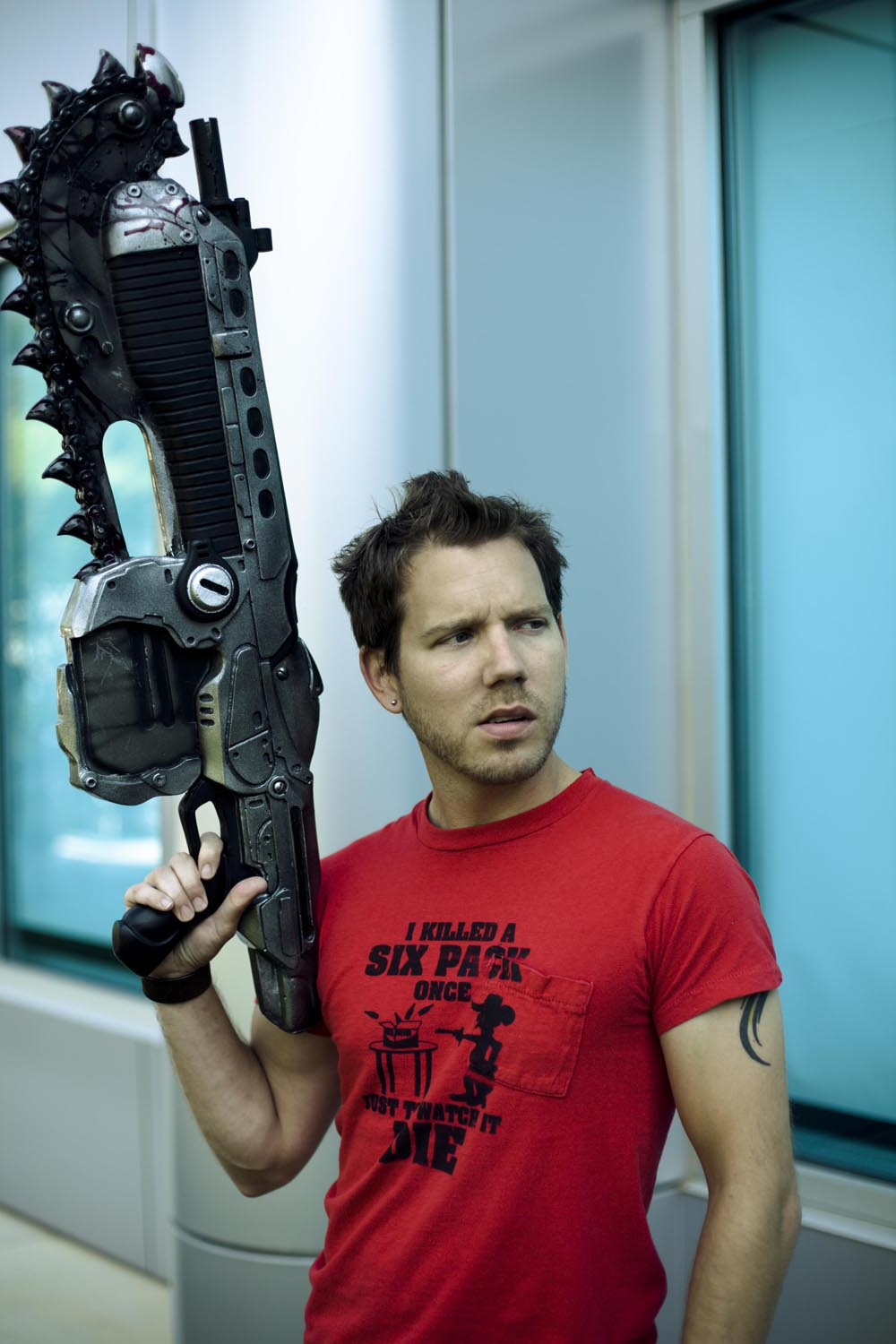
Cliff Bleszinski (pictured) and James Schmalz were the lead designers of their respective companies and contributed significantly to the final game content.

With a budget of $2 million, using 350,000 lines of C++ and UnrealScript, Unreal Tournament took around a year and a half to develop. When Unreal (the first installment of the Unreal series) was released in May 1998, it was well received by the press, but it soon became apparent that the quality of the network code used for multiplayer matches was hampering the game's further success. In the months following Unreal's release, improving the game's multiplayer part became the top priority of the development team. Epic Games started considering an official expansion pack intended to improve the network code while also featuring new maps and other gameplay elements.

The team began work on the expansion in summer 1998, but the task became complicated by Epic's organizational structure. During the development of Unreal, the team members at Digital Extremes were working in Ontario, Canada, while the members at Epic were based in North Carolina, United States, requiring regular travel to Ontario. To remedy this, Epic decided to centralize the teams in Raleigh, North Carolina, and by September, work on the expansion could begin. Lead programmer Steve Polge set about laying the foundations for the new game types, such as Capture the Flag and Domination, and level designers created the first round of maps for testing. The content grew quickly, and soon the team realized that it had underestimated the task. In November, after a meeting with publisher GT Interactive, Mark Rein suggested releasing the work as a stand-alone game instead of an expansion. The team was reluctant at first, but soon accepted the idea, and in December the game became known internally as Unreal: Tournament Edition.

The development team for Unreal Tournament consisted of around 16 people. Most team members had worked on Unreal, though Epic hired a number of new developers to reinforce the team. Programmer Brandon Reinhart was one such hire, joining Epic in August 1998 to help with the support of Unreal and the development of Unreal Tournament. That December, Reinhart discovered an Unreal mod called UBrowser, which provided a new user interface for finding multiplayer matches. After showing it to James Schmalz, the lead designer at Digital Extremes, Schmalz decided to hire the mod's author, Jack Porter. After only a few weeks Porter was already working with the team, replacing the game's existing menu system with his new interface. Epic founder Tim Sweeney worked on improving the networking code along with Steve Polge, who also wrote code for AI, player physics and general gameplay. Erik de Neve was responsible for the LOD character rendering, and various extra optimizations.

During the game's development, the team lacked artists. The art director at Epic Games, Shane Caudle, and the artists at Digital Extremes could not make enough new textures because of the amount of diversity in characters and maps. To help with the skin and texture production, Epic contracted Steve Garofalo. The game's level and content management program, UnrealEd, was written in Visual Basic and considered buggy, but no one had time to fix it. The game engine had an object-oriented design, and the scripting language, UnrealScript, was considered to be more like Java. The modularity of the object-oriented design meant that programmers could make large changes without affecting other parts of the game. Other tools used during development included Microsoft Visual Studio and 3D Studio Max. All of the weapon sound effects were created by Sonic Mayhem. The soundtrack for the game, which employed the system of module files, was written by Alexander Brandon, Michiel van den Bos, Andrew Sega, Dan Gardopee, Peter Hajba and Tero Kostermaa. Unreal Tournament had support for the EAX Version 2.0 3D positional audio technology by Creative Labs and A3D 2.0 HRTF technology by Aureal Semiconductor out of the box.

In 1999, Epic Games released a playable demo on September 16. This version of the demo was only compatible with Glide-based accelerators. An updated demo version, with support for OpenGL and Direct3D cards, was released on September 28. Unreal Tournament went gold (became ready for release) on November 16, shipping a few days later on November 22. The Mac version went gold on December 15. The Dreamcast version was developed by Secret Level, who had to drop Assault mode, along with many larger maps, due to the Dreamcast having insufficient memory. A Linux port of Unreal Tournament was also in development. The goal of the project was to improve the quality of the Linux port of the game as well as strengthen the mod authoring community and teach Epic about open source projects. In 2000, Loki Software made an exclusive agreement with Epic Games to maintain and support the Linux version of Unreal Tournament, offering new features, addressing any technical issues and achieving revision parity with the Windows version. Bonus Pack 1 was released on February 25, 2000. Unreal Tournament was re-released in fall (autumn) 2000 as Unreal Tournament: Game of the Year Edition, which includes the first three bonus packs and mods such as Rocket Arena, a one-on-one combat mode.

== Reception ==
Reception

Aggregate scores
Aggregator	Score
GameRankings	PC: 94%
Metacritic	PC: 92/100; PS2: 77/100; SDC: 90/100

Review scores
Publication	Score
AllGame	PC: 4.5/5
CNET Gamecenter	PC: 10/10
Computer Games Strategy Plus	PC: 5/5
Computer Gaming World	PC: 5/5
Computer and Video Games	PC: 9/10
Edge	PC: 7/10; SDC: 6/10
EP Daily	PC: 10/10; PS2: 3/10; SDC: 9.5/10
Eurogamer	PC: 10/10
Game Informer	PS2: 9/10
GameFan	PC: 95/100
GamePro	PC: 4.5/5; PS2: 4.5/5
GameRevolution	PC: A− PS2: B SDC: B+
GameSpot	PC: 9.5/10; PS2: 8.2/10; SDC: 9.4/10
GameSpy	PC: 94/100; PS2: 77% SDC: 8/10
GamesRadar+	PS2: 69%
IGN	PC: 9.6/10; MAC: 9.6/10; PS2: 8.4/10; SDC: 9.4/10
Macworld	MAC: 4.5/5
Maximum PC	PC: 9/10
Next Generation	PC: 4/5; PS2: 3/5; SDC: 4/5
PC Accelerator	PC: 10/10
PC Gamer (UK)	PC: 92/100
PC Gamer (US)	PC: 90/100
PC PowerPlay	PC: 94/100
PC Zone	PC: 90/100
X-Play	SDC: 3/5
Gamezilla	PS2: 86% SDC: 87%
Happy Puppy	MAC: 9/10; SDC: 8/10
Inside Mac Games	MAC: 9/10
Dreamcast Magazine (UK)	SDC: 87%
Maxim	SDC: 4/5

In the United States alone, Unreal Tournament sold 100,998 copies by the end of 1999, according to PC Data. The game's sales in the country reached 128,766 copies, for revenues of $5.42 million, by early 2000. This placed it behind competitor Quake III: Arena over the same period. From January through October 2000, Unreal Tournament sold 234,451 units and earned $8.94 million in the region. The game ultimately received a "Silver" sales award from the Entertainment and Leisure Software Publishers Association (ELSPA), indicating sales of at least 100,000 copies in the United Kingdom. By November 2001, Unreal Tournament's total sales were close to 2 million units.

Upon its release, Unreal Tournament received universal acclaim from critics, earning an overall score of 92 out of 100 on aggregate review website Metacritic. Similarly, Unreal Tournament earned an overall score of 94% on the video gaming review aggregator GameRankings. Mainstream press reviews lauded the title for its graphics, gameplay and level design, with Computer and Video Games calling it "a technical and game-playing marvel". In March 2000, Unreal Tournament was second on a list of best-selling games in Computer Dealer News trade magazine, but the development team believed sales would have been higher if the game was released in October 1999.

Jeff Gerstmann of GameSpot praised the graphics, multiplayer gameplay, weapons, and level design. The game was similarly reviewed by GameSpy, who stated that the title raised the bar for first person multiplayer games. British magazine PC Zone was pleased with the "very intelligent" bots, but criticized the "truly terrible" music. AllGame complimented the addictiveness of Assault mode, and the game's replay value, calling it "a glowing, shining beacon in a sea of multi-player games". Computer and Video Games found the game to have an "excellent" single-player mode, adding that with an average AI skill the player will "progress with little serious effort, taking a thrilling ride through spectacularly atmospheric levels and increasing numbers of opponents". Eurogamer echoed that sentiment, and commented that the game is playable on low-end systems.

Writing for GamePro, Nash Werner said the multiplayer flexibility was "immense", adding that mutators like low gravity, Sniper Arena and Chainsaw Melee "change everything about the way deathmatch is played". Game Revolution agreed and praised the bots and maps, although it complained that player models were not particularly varied and that the game was not "as visually appealing as the original Unreal". IGN stated that Unreal Tournament received the highest ever score at the time of their review, describing the game as nearly flawless. British magazine PC Gamer complimented the artificial intelligence, and its American counterpart did the same to the game's "gorgeous" graphics and "incredible" editing tools. Computer Games Strategy Plus described the artificial intelligence as "outstanding", and commented that the Domination and Assault modes add interest. The Electric Playground, who rated the game 10 out of 10, praised the "innovative" level design, while Computer Gaming World gave it five stars out of five, saying that Unreal Tournament redeemed both Epic and the Unreal franchise to action gamers.

The Macintosh version of Unreal Tournament was equally praised. IGN enjoyed the "perfect" gameplay and multiplayer options, but criticized the high system requirements and the user interface. Nevertheless, the game was described as "the must have title" for Mac. Happy Puppy described the game as "king of deathmatch" due to its "incredible value" gaming and "amazing" variety. Inside Mac Games praised the replay value, but criticized the high system requirements. In December 1999, Unreal Tournament was inducted into the Macworld Hall of Fame.

Reviewing the Dreamcast version, Gamezilla complimented the sound, but criticized the graphics and lack of a plot. Happy Puppy described the game as "intensely fun", but criticized the "mediocre" sound. Edge criticized the lack of Assault mode. The British Dreamcast Magazine (not to be confused with the Official Dreamcast Magazine or DC-UK) was ambivalent to the port's gameplay, visuals and sounds, noting its "blasting" action and the removal of online multiplayer from the European version of the game. GameSpy cited both slow framerate speeds and low sound quality as problems with the Dreamcast version. Scott Steinberg of Maxim rated the game 4 out of 5 stars, labeling it as a "stone-cold killer" that "runs like Carl Lewis on a Jolt Cola binge" while noting its "surprisingly workable" standard game pad controls.

The PlayStation 2 release did not fare as well as the PC and Dreamcast versions. GameSpy criticized the graphics of the PS2 version, calling it "uninspired". Its conclusion said about sluggish gameplay, somewhat washed out colors and textures. IGN praised the replayability, and stated that the sound is faithful to the PC version. Gamezilla criticized the PlayStation 2 version's lack of multiplayer support compared to the PC version along with Game Informer, who said despite its flaws, the game "holds its own as one of the best FPSs out there". On the other hand, the port scored 3 out of 10 in the television show The Electric Playground, with the reviewer lauding the audio and graphics but feeling that the controls could have been better implemented.

In addition to receiving Eurogamer's first-ever perfect score, Unreal Tournament was named by the site one of the best games of 1999. Launch editor John Bye chose the shooter as the game of the past decade (1999–2009) and said: "Unreal Tournament is one of the few games in the early days of Eurogamer that I kept going back to months after I'd finished reviewing it, a game that I played to unwind after a long day playing other games. Whether it was trying to break the one-minute barrier in the speed running mayhem of Assault mode, battling back and forth amongst the alleyways of Domination, or dropping shrapnel shells at people's feet with the wonderfully chunky flak cannon in a fast and furious free-for-all deathmatch, Unreal Tournament was an endless source of entertainment". In 2004, Unreal Tournament was inducted into the Computer Gaming World Hall of Fame. Unreal Tournament was a nominee for PC Gamer US's 1999 "Best Action Game" and "Best Multiplayer Game" awards, which went to Tom Clancy's Rainbow Six: Rogue Spear and Team Fortress Classic, respectively. They called it "a brilliant multiplayer game that blew its main rival Quake III away with awesome bots, graphics, game types and online functionality". Unreal Tournament was named as a finalist by the Academy of Interactive Arts & Sciences for "Game of the Year", "Computer Game of the Year", "Computer Action Game of the Year", and won "Outstanding Achievement in Visual Engineering" at the 3rd Annual Interactive Achievement Awards. The Dreamcast version Unreal Tournament was a finalist for "11th Annual GamePro Readers' Choice Awards" for "Best Combat Game of The Year", but lost to Halo: Combat Evolved for Xbox.

In 2011, G4tv included two maps from this game, Facing Worlds and DM-Deck 16, in its list of the "Most Influential FPS Multiplayer Maps Ever". In 2013, PC Gamer labeled the Flak Cannon the greatest gun in PC gaming. In 2014, Complex magazine placed Unreal Tournament as number three on its list of "The 50 Best First Person Shooters Of All Time", while Moviepilot placed it as number two on its list of "The 7 Most Influential Video Games Ever". In November 2014, Kotaku named Facing Worlds the best multiplayer map. In January 2016, Red Bull labeled Facing Worlds one of the 10 greatest FPS multiplayer levels of all time. In July 2016, the game was ranked number 20 on Bit-Tech's The 50 Best PC Games of All Time.

=== Awards ===
List of awards and nominations
Publication	Category	Result	Ref.
Computer Gaming World	Game of the Year	Won	
Computer Gaming World	Best Level Design	Won	
GameSpy	Game of the Year	Won	
GameSpy	Special Achievement in Artificial Intelligence	Won	
GameSpot	Action Game of the Year	Won	
GameSpot	Game of the Year (Readers' Choice)	Won	
GameSpot	Action Game of the Year (Readers' Choice)	Won	
GameSpot	Game of the Year	Nominated	
GameSpot	Best Multiplayer Game	Nominated	
GameSpot	Best Graphics, Artistic Design	Nominated	
GameSpot	Best Shooting Game (Console)	Nominated	
GameSpot	Best Dreamcast Game	Nominated	
Academy of Interactive Arts & Sciences (3rd Annual Interactive Achievement Awards)	Game of the Year	Nominated	
Academy of Interactive Arts & Sciences (3rd Annual Interactive Achievement Awards)	Computer Game of the Year	Nominated	
Academy of Interactive Arts & Sciences (3rd Annual Interactive Achievement Awards)	Computer Action Game of the Year	Nominated	
Academy of Interactive Arts & Sciences (3rd Annual Interactive Achievement Awards)	Outstanding Achievement in Visual Engineering	Won	
CNET	PC Game of the Year	Nominated	
CNET	Action Game of the Year	Nominated	
CNET	Multiplayer Game of the Year	Won	
Game Revolution	Best Online PC Game	Won	
Games Domain	Action Game of the Year (Readers' Choice)	Won	
Daily Radar	Best PC Game	Won	
Daily Radar	Game of the Year	Runner-up	
Daily Radar	Game of the Year (Readers' Choice)	Runner-up	
Macworld	Best Network Shooter for the Mac	Won	
GameStar	Multiplayer Game of the Year	Won	
PC Player	Best First Person Shooter	Won	
PC Zone	Game of the Year (Readers' Choice)	Won	
PC Zone	First Person Action Game of the Year (Readers' Choice)	Won	
PC Zone	Game of the Millennium	Nominated	

=== Player community ===
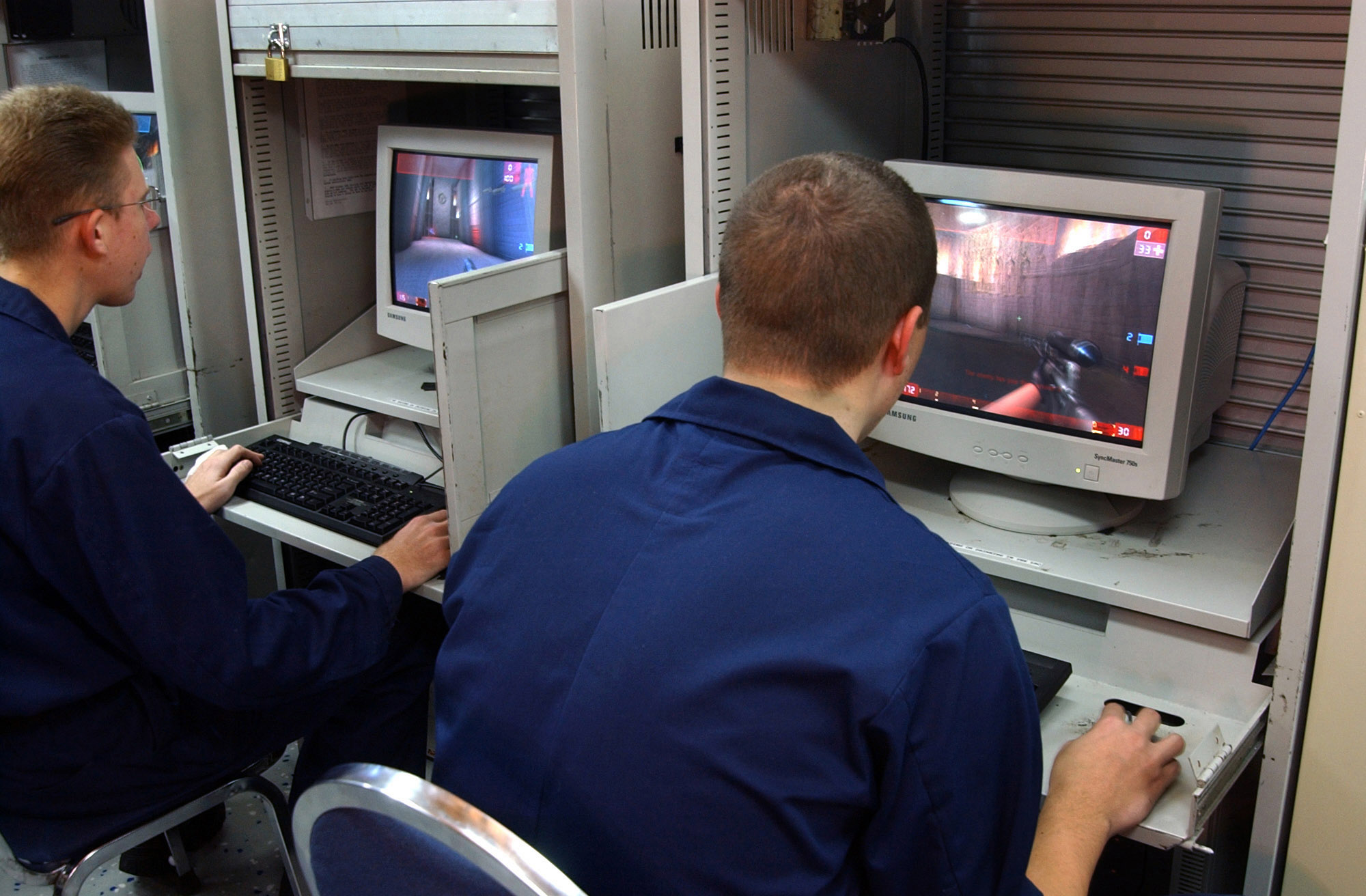
USS San Jacinto (CG-56) crewmembers playing the game, 2002

Lead designer Cliff Bleszinski credited much of the game's success to its community. As he said in the November 2001 issue of Maximum PC: "Unreal Tournament would not have sold nearly two million copies if it did not have support from the community... We ship the very same tools that we used to build the game, and folks use these tools to realize their own visions of first-person action". Like its predecessor, Unreal Tournament is designed to be easily programmable and highly modularized. Through its scripting environment UnrealScript and level editor UnrealEd, developers are able to modify easily most parts of the game to both manipulate default game behavior and to supplement the game with their own mods. These range from slight changes on some aspects of gameplay (such as map voting) to total conversions. One modification, ChaosUT, became popular enough that it was included with the 'Game of the Year' edition of the game, while Tactical Ops: Assault on Terror was released as a stand-alone retail product.

Unreal Tournament was played at the World Cyber Games in 2001 and 2002.

== Legacy ==
The success of the original Unreal Tournament spawned four sequels, including Unreal Tournament 2003 and Unreal Tournament 2004, Unreal Tournament 3 and the cancelled Unreal Tournament reboot. The yearly naming structure, based around marketing the franchise as a competitive sports title, was abandoned before the launch of the third sequel. Dark Sector by Digital Extremes was initially planned as a spiritual successor to Unreal Tournament. In 2019 the OldUnreal community was given approval by Epic for providing semi-official patches to support modern hardware and operating systems. The game was released for free on the Internet Archive in late October 2024.

== Adaptation ==
Unreal Tournament is the subject of anthology series Secret Level, created by Tim Miller for Amazon Prime Video and released in December 2024. The episode, Unreal Tournament: Xan, has the voices of Elodie Yung, Gideon Emery, Mitch Eakins, Chris Payne Gilbert, Carlin James, and Fred Tatasciore.
