= Tim Sweeney =

American video game developer (born 1970)

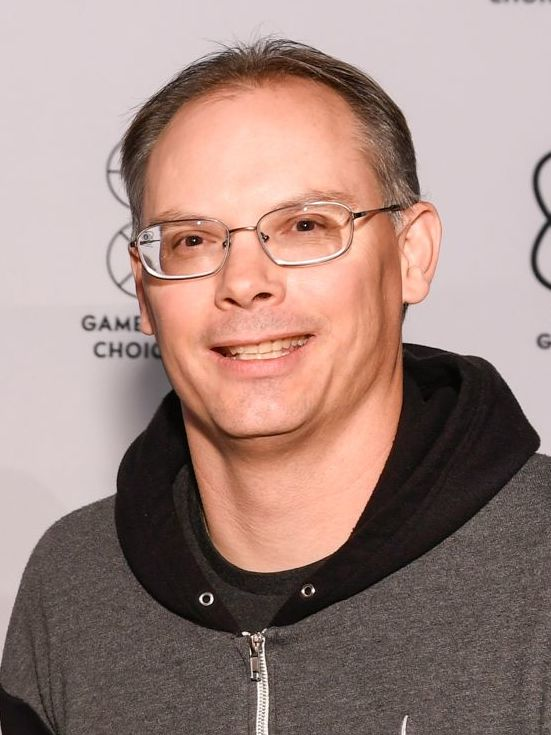
- Sweeney in 2017
- Born: Timothy Dean Sweeney; 1970 (age 55–56)
- Education: University of Maryland
- Occupations: Video game programmer and developer, businessman
- Organization: Epic Games
- Notable work: ZZT; Unreal Engine
- Title: Founder and CEO of Epic Games
- Awards: AIAS Hall of Fame Award (2012); GDC Lifetime Achievement Award (2017)

Timothy Dean Sweeney (born 1970) is an American video game programmer and businessman. He is the founder and CEO of Epic Games and the creator of Unreal Engine, a game development platform.

== Early life ==
Sweeney was raised in Potomac, Maryland, the youngest of three brothers. At a young age, he became interested in tinkering with mechanical and electrical devices, and stated he had taken apart a lawnmower as early as five or six, and later built his own go-kart. He became interested in arcade games when they began to become popular in the late 1970s, knowing that like the mechanical devices he took apart and repaired, there were those that had programmed the games in the machines. Though the family got an Atari 2600, Sweeney was not as interested in the games for that, outside of Adventure, and later said he had not played many video games in his life and very few to completion.

At the age of 11, Sweeney visited his older brother's new startup in California, where he had access to early IBM Personal Computers. Sweeney spent the week there, learning BASIC and establishing his interest in programming; while he had had a Commodore 64 before, Sweeney was much more taken by how easy the IBM PC was to use. When his family got an Apple II, Sweeney began in earnest learning how to program on that, trying to make Adventure 2 in the spirit of the Atari 2600 game. Sweeney estimated that between the ages of 11 and 15, he spent over 10,000 hours teaching himself how to program using information on online bulletin boards, and completed several games, though never shared these with others. He also learned from his brothers' concepts of entrepreneurship. As a teenager, he made a good deal of money by offering to mow lawns of wealthy residents in the area for half the price of professional services.

== Founding of Epic Games ==
Sweeney attended the University of Maryland starting around 1989 where he studied mechanical engineering, though he was still fascinated by computers. Around this time, his father, who worked for the Defense Mapping Agency, gave him an IBM Personal Computer/AT. Sweeney established a consulting business, Potomac Computer Systems, out of his parents' home, but it never took off and he shelved the company. Later, Sweeney had the idea of creating games that could be sold, programming them at night or over weekends outside college work. This first required him to create a text editor based on the Pascal language to be able to program the game, which led to the idea of making a game out of the text editor itself. This became the basis of ZZT. He let college friends and those around his neighborhood provide feedback, and was aware it was something he could sell to other computer users. To distribute the game, Sweeney looked to the shareware model, and wrote to Scott Miller of Apogee Software, Ltd., a leading shareware producer at the time, for ideas on how to distribute ZZT. He revitalized Potomac Computer Systems for selling ZZT, fulfilling mail orders with help of his father. ZZT sold well enough, a few copies each day that came to about US$100 per day, that Sweeney decided to make developing games his career. Recognizing he needed a better name for a video game company, he renamed Potomac Computer Systems to Epic MegaGames.

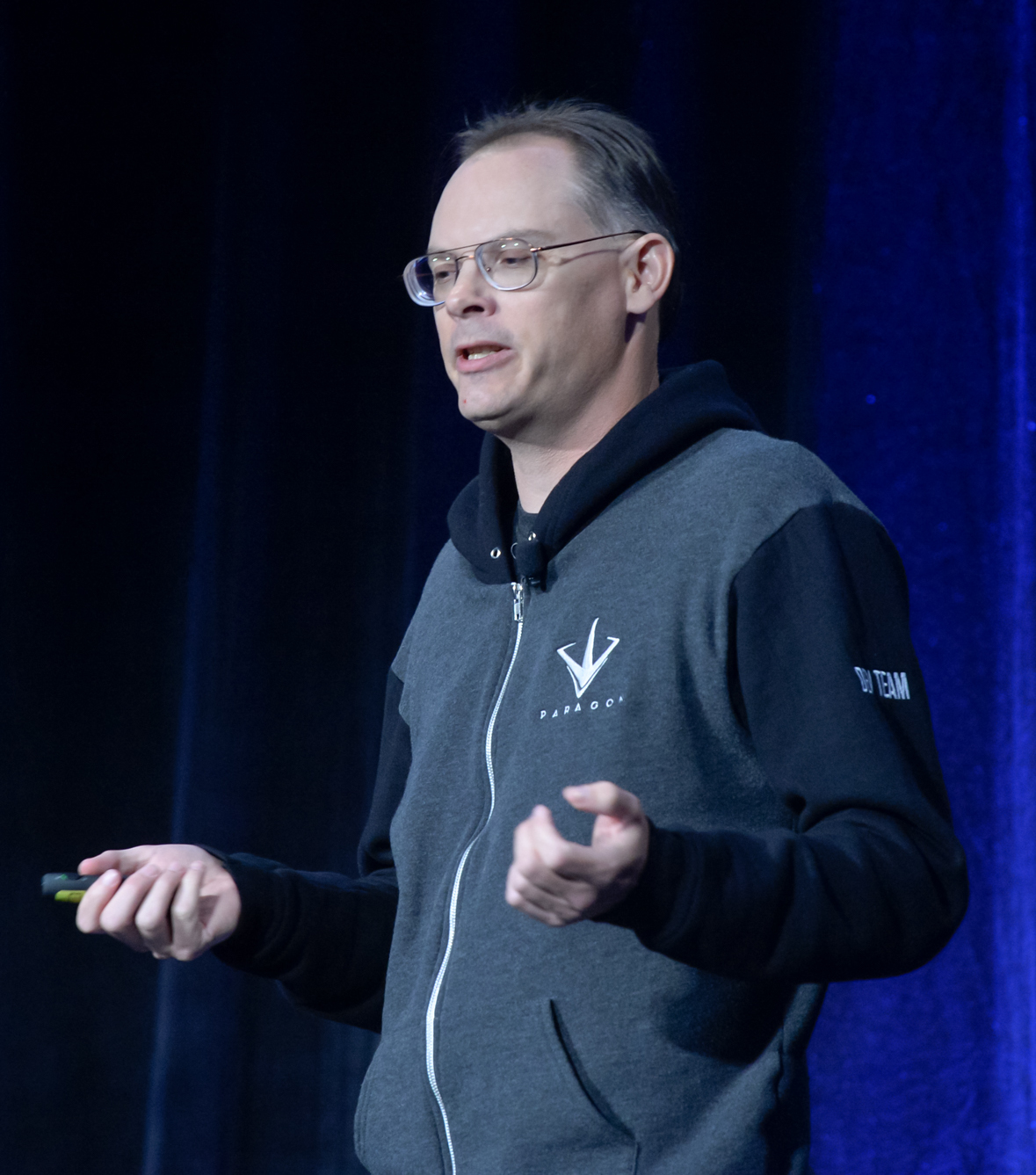
Sweeney giving a presentation at the 2016 Game Developers Conference

Following ZZT, Sweeney started working on his next title, Jill of the Jungle, but found that he lacked the skills to complete this alone. He formed a team of four people to complete the game by mid-1992. For continued development, Sweeney sought out a business partner for Epic MegaGames, eventually coming to Mark Rein, who had just been let go from id Software. Rein helped with growing and managing the company; due to the company's growth, Sweeney did not end up getting his degree, short by one credit. Sweeney would later start work on Unreal Engine, developed for the 1998 first-person shooter game Unreal and licensed by multiple other video games. With the success of Unreal, the company relocated to North Carolina in 1999, and changed its name to Epic Games.

== Leadership of Epic Games ==
Sweeney continued as chief executive of Epic Games as the company expanded its business around Fortnite and digital distribution. Epic launched the Epic Games Store in 2018 and expanded it to mobile devices in 2024, making it available on iOS in the European Union and on Android worldwide.

In 2020, Sweeney led Epic’s challenge to Apple’s App Store policies after Epic introduced its own payment system in Fortnite to circumvent Apple’s commission. Apple subsequently removed Fortnite from the App Store, and Epic filed an antitrust lawsuit against Apple.

A U.S. district judge ruled largely in Apple’s favor in Epic’s antitrust lawsuit in September 2021 but ordered Apple to allow developers to direct users to alternative payment methods.

Sweeney testified during Epic’s antitrust litigation against Google over its Google Play Store. In December 2023, a federal jury unanimously found in Epic's favor, ruling that Google’s Play Store practices were anticompetitive.

In February 2024, The Walt Disney Company announced a $1.5 billion investment in Epic Games and a partnership to develop an interconnected games and entertainment universe incorporating Disney, Pixar, Star Wars, and other properties with Fortnite. Sweeney described the project as an effort to build a persistent and interoperable ecosystem connecting the Disney and Fortnite communities.

The Ninth Circuit upheld the principal findings and injunction against Google in July 2025. Google subsequently sought Supreme Court review, but withdrew its petition in March 2026 after reaching a settlement with Epic.

In March 2026, Epic and Google reached a settlement under which Google agreed to reduce its Play Store fees and permit greater use of alternative billing systems and third-party app stores. Sweeney characterized the agreement as a victory for competition and openness on Android.

Epic announced in March 2026 that it would lay off more than 1,000 employees following declining engagement with Fortnite. Sweeney said the company was spending significantly more than it was earning and expected the cuts, together with reductions in contracting and marketing, to produce more than $500 million in savings.

== Conservation and philanthropy ==
Since the real estate bubble collapsed in 2008, Sweeney has used his fortune to purchase large tracts of land in North Carolina, reportedly for conservation, becoming one of the largest private landowners in the state. As of November 2025, he has bought 50,000 acres of forest land including the Box Creek Wilderness, a 7,000-acre natural area that contains more than 130 rare and threatened plants and wildlife species. Sweeney, who had paid $15 million for Box Creek Wilderness, donated the conservation easement to the United States Fish and Wildlife Service in 2016. One of the motives to put Box Creek Wilderness under conservation easement was a condemnation lawsuit filed by a power company who planned to build a transmission line through the land. The lawsuit was settled following the Fish and Wildlife Service's and Senator Richard Burr's involvement in protecting the site, which prevented it from being fragmented. "I'm grateful for the efforts of Senator Burr to help protect Box Creek Wilderness," Sweeney said. "And for the whole Fish and Wildlife Service team's tireless efforts to preserve vital North Carolina natural areas in partnership with conservation-minded landowners like me."

Additionally, he has participated in the expansion to Mount Mitchell State Park by donating 1,500 acres (610 ha) to a conservation project.

In April 2021, it was announced that Sweeney would donate 7,500 acres in the Roan Highlands of western North Carolina to the Southern Appalachian Highlands Conservancy. When transferred the next year, the conservancy will manage the property as a nature preserve, conducting scientific studies in collaboration with Sweeney and offering guided hikes. This acreage, valued at tens of millions of dollars, is the largest private conservation land donation in the history of North Carolina. Over nearly two decades, he has used his wealth to conserve natural land and later transfer it to conservation groups, prioritizing environmental protection over profit or publicity.

== Awards and recognition ==
Wired magazine awarded him a Rave Award in 2007 for his work on Unreal Engine 3, the technology behind the 2006 game Gears of War.

In February 2012, Sweeney was inducted into the Academy of Interactive Arts & Sciences (AIAS) Hall of Fame.

In recognition of his conservation efforts, he was named Land Conservationist of the Year in 2013 by the North Carolina Wildlife Federation, and later in 2014 the land trusts of North Carolina honored him with the Stanback Volunteer Conservationist of the Year Award.

In 2017, Sweeney was the recipient of the Lifetime Achievement Award at the Game Developers Choice Awards.

In 2019, he was named Person of the Year by British video game industry trade magazine MCV.

At the Forbes Media Awards 2020, Sweeney was chosen as Person of the Year for building and turning Fortnite into a social network with his company.

== Personal life ==
Sweeney lives in Cary, North Carolina. According to Forbes, as of May 2022, he has a net worth of $7.6 billion. However, Bloomberg estimates his wealth at $9.6 billion.

Since 2006, Sweeney has filed several patents related to computer software.

== Publications ==
- Tim Sweeney (2000). A Critical Look at Programming Languages. GameSpy – via Internet Archive.
- Tim Sweeney (2006). The Next Mainstream Programming Language: A Game Developer's Perspective. Symposium on Principles of Programming Languages (POPL) – via MIT CSAIL.
- Tim Sweeney (2008). Wild Speculation on Consumer Workloads: 2012-2020. IEEE International Symposium on Workload Characterization (IISWC).
- Neal Glew, Tim Sweeney & Leaf Petersen (2013). A Multivalued Language with a Dependent Type System. Proceedings of the 2013 ACM SIGPLAN workshop on Dependently-typed programming.
- Neal Glew, Tim Sweeney & Leaf Petersen (2013). Formalisation of the λ_{ℵ} Runtime. arXiv.
- Lennart Augustsson, Joachim Breitner, Koen Claessen, Ranjit Jhala, Simon Peyton Jones, Olin Shivers, Tim Sweeney (2022). The Verse Calculus: a Core Calculus for Functional Logic Programming. simon.peytonjones.org.
