= Unreal (1998 video game) =

First-person shooter game

- Developers: Epic MegaGames; Digital Extremes (Note: Legend Entertainment developed a mission pack titled Unreal Mission Pack I: Return to Na Pali.)
- Publisher: GT Interactive
- Producers: Jason Schreiber; Greg Williams
- Designers: James Schmalz; Cliff Bleszinski
- Programmers: Tim Sweeney; Steve Polge; Erik de Neve
- Artists: Artur Bialas; Mike Leatham; James Schmalz
- Composers: Alexander Brandon; Michiel van den Bos; Andrew G. Sega; Dan Gardopée
- Series: Unreal
- Engine: Unreal Engine
- Platforms: Windows, Mac OS
- Release: Windows: NA: May 22, 1998; UK: June 12, 1998; Mac OS: NA: September 1, 1998
- Genre: First-person shooter
- Modes: Single-player, multiplayer

Unreal is a 1998 first-person shooter game developed by Epic MegaGames and Digital Extremes and published by GT Interactive for Microsoft Windows. Set in a science-fiction universe, the player controls a prisoner whose prison spacecraft crash-lands on a mysterious planet, where they must find a way to escape while combatting the occupying alien empire. It is the first entry in the Unreal game series and was powered by the titular Unreal Engine. The game reached sales of 1.5 million units by 2002.

Since the release of Unreal, the franchise has had many entries including one sequel and a spin-off series with multiple commercially successful and award winning games based on the Unreal universe referred to as the Unreal Tournament series. One official bonus pack, the Epic-released Fusion Map Pack, can be downloaded free of charge. Unreal Mission Pack I: Return to Na Pali, developed by Legend Entertainment, was released in June 1999, and added 17 new missions to the single-player campaign of Unreal. Unreal and Return to Na Pali would later be bundled together with the updated version of the game's engine from Unreal Tournament and released as Unreal Gold. In 2024, the game officially became freeware with Epic Games’ blessing.

== Plot ==
The player takes on the role of Prisoner 849, aboard the prison spacecraft Vortex Rikers. During transport to a moon-based prison, the ship is pulled to an uncharted planet, before reaching its destination. The ship crash-lands on the lip of a canyon on the planet Na Pali, home of the Nali, a primitive tribal race of four-armed humanoids. The Nali and their planet have been subjugated by the Skaarj, a race of savage yet technologically advanced reptilian humanoids, who also have an army of genetically engineered Brutes and an enslaved race of warriors, known as the Krall. Skaarj troops board the downed Vortex Rikers and kill the remaining survivors, except for Prisoner 849, who manages to find a weapon and escape from the ship.

The planet Na Pali is rich in "Tarydium", a mineral that is found as light blue crystals, possessing a high energy yield and are the reason the Skaarj have invaded. The Vortex Rikers had crashed near one of the many mines and processing facilities that the Skaarj have built. Prisoner 849 travels through the mines, meeting Nali slaves along the way and eventually reaching the ruins of Nali temples, villages and cities, where the extent of the Nali's suffering and exploitation become clear. The player passes through a water temple and a massive arena, where the player must kill a giant beast called a Titan.

Throughout the game, the player stumbles upon the remains of other humans, often with electronic journals that detail their last days and hint toward the cause of their demise. Usually, these tales are of desperate struggles to hide from the Skaarj, or other bloodthirsty inhabitants of the planet. The player never meets another live human, aside from a wounded crew member on the bridge of the prison ship, who gasps and dies immediately. Prisoner 849 is likely the only human alive on the planet Na Pali throughout the duration of the game.

Prisoner 849 continues to make their way through a series of alien installations, a second crashed human spaceship and ancient Nali temples infested with Skaarj troops and their minions, before eventually arriving at the Nali Castle. Inside the castle, the prisoner locates a teleporter that leads to the Skaarj Mothership. The mothership proves to be a vast labyrinth, but Prisoner 849 manages to find and destroy the ship's reactor, whilst fighting their way through hordes of Skaarj. The reactor's destruction plunges the vessel into darkness and after navigating the ship's corridors in the dark, the player finally arrives at the Skaarj Queen's chamber, where they fight and ultimately, kill the Queen. Prisoner 849 jumps into the Queen's personal escape pod as the mothership disintegrates. Although the prisoner survives the horrors of Na Pali, their escape pod is left to drift in space, with only a slim hope of being found.

=== Expansion plot ===
The expansion, Return to Na Pali, developed by Legend Entertainment, picks up not long after Unreal's ending; Prisoner 849 is found by a human warship, the UMS Bodega Bay. The Unified Military Services (UMS) conscript the prisoner into service, upon learning their identity, forcing Prisoner 849 to return to Na Pali in order to locate the downed ship UMS Prometheus. There, the prisoner is ordered to retrieve some weapons research. In return, the prisoner will receive a full pardon and transportation back to Earth, though the real plan is revealed to be maintaining the secrecy of the mission, by killing the prisoner immediately after the information is secured.

Upon arriving at the Prometheus, Prisoner 849 finds the secret weapons log, but soon after, they find a working radio communicator nearby. The prisoner listens to a recently recorded and archived conversation between the Bodega Bay and a nearby space station, the UMS Starlight, exposing the military's treachery. As Prisoner 849 transmits the research log, a squad of marines beam on board Prometheus, intending to eliminate the prisoner who manages to escape into a nearby mine system.

Once again, Prisoner 849 is forced to traverse a series of alien facilities and Nali temples, in an attempt to locate another way off the planet. Eventually, the prisoner ends up at another Nali Castle, where a small space shuttle is stored. After fighting through Skaarj, Krall and other monsters, the prisoner battles the final opponent, a Skaarj Warlord, before killing it and managing to take off in the spacecraft. Bodega Bay, however, is waiting in orbit and launches a missile at the prisoner's ship. The prisoner outmanoeuvres the missile, and leads it back to Bodega Bay on a collision course. The large ship is disabled by the ensuing blast, and Prisoner 849 escapes into space.

== Development ==
Unreal was jointly developed by Epic MegaGames and Digital Extremes and mostly funded with the proceeds from Epic Pinball, Epic's best selling shareware game. In the February 1997 issue of Next Generation, lead designer James Schmalz recalled how it started:

I made the terrain first. A Magic Carpet-type terrain ... I was experimenting with a cavern-set, robot-type game, and I progressed to the continuous mesh technique that we have now, so I changed it from caverns to outdoors. By then I had these polygon creatures, like this dragon flying around – that was the first good polygon creature we made up. From there we added buildings, and [lead programmer] Tim [Sweeney] got into making this editor for doing the buildings – after that, it took off ... So I started focusing on the creatures and the artwork, and Tim took over the engine. [Co-designer] Cliff [Bleszinski] came on ... Because the editor was making it so easy to put together the structures, we had the tool to make the indoor areas, so there was less focus on the outdoor stuff.

While the team still had only the outdoor terrain and the dragon in place, Intel invited Epic MegaGames to demonstrate Unreal to them. Following the demonstration, Intel told them about their upcoming MMX instruction set. Sweeney was immediately excited by the possibilities MMX presented, and put together a working MMX version of the rendering code before Epic had even received a chip with MMX.

Originally, Unreal was going to feature a large status bar and centered weapons, similar to Doom and Quake. As development progressed, various levels were cut from development. A few of these levels reappeared in the Return to Na Pali expansion pack. A number of enemies from early versions are present in the released software, but with modifications and improvements to their appearance. One monster that didn't make the cut was a dragon. One of the weapons shown in early screenshots was the "Quadshot" – a four-barreled shotgun; the model remains in-game, while there is no code for the weapon to function (several user-made modifications bring the weapon back in the game). Another weapon shown was a different pistol, but this may have just been an early version of the Automag. At one point, the rifle could fire three shots at once, which is wrongly stated as the alternate fire in the Unreal manual that comes with Unreal Anthology.

A screenshot of Unreal released by Epic MegaGames, c. 1995

Initially the game's player character was to be female, but as the number of games with female playable characters increased, the team decided to allow the player to select from a male character and a female character.

In late 1996 GT Interactive secured exclusive global publishing rights to Unreal.

With the game still in development, Epic MegaGames started work on a port for the Nintendo 64DD. Mark Rein revealed that while a port for the standalone Nintendo 64 was possible, the limited storage space of the cartridge format would have necessitated heavy compromises to the details on the monsters and the number of unique textures. A Dreamcast port was also planned, and was in fact demoed for the system's capabilities early on its lifecycle, but was canceled when GT Interactive entered financial struggles (one of the reasons they would be purchased by Infogrames in 1999), and a port of Unreal Tournament would take its place in 2001.

Since Unreal came packaged with its own scripting language called UnrealScript, it soon developed a large community on the Internet which was able to add new modifications, or mods, in order to change or enhance gameplay. This feature greatly added to the overall longevity of the product and provided an incentive for new development. A map editor and overall complete modification program called UnrealEd also came with the package.

Unreal's method of creating maps differs in major ways from that of Quake. The bundled UnrealEd map editor uses the Unreal engine to render scenes exactly as they appear in-game, as opposed to external editors like Worldcraft attempting to recreate it with different methods. Whereas Quake maps are compiled from a variety of different components, Unreal maps are inherently editable on the fly. This allows anybody to edit any map that is created, including the maps included with the game.

=== Graphics ===
The Unreal engine brought a host of graphical improvements rarely seen at that time. Unreal's software renderer allowed software features as rich as the hardware renderers of the time, including colored lighting and even a limited form of texture filtering referred to by Sweeney as an ordered "texture coordinate space" dither. Early pre-release versions of Unreal were based entirely on software rendering.

Unreal was one of the first games to utilize detail texturing. This type of multiple texturing enhances the surfaces of objects with a second texture that shows material detail. When the player stands within a small distance from most surfaces, the detail texture will fade in and make the surface appear much more complex (high-resolution) instead of becoming increasingly blurry. Notable surfaces with these special detail textures included computer monitors, pitted metal surfaces aboard the prison ship, golden metal doors, and stone surfaces within Nali temples. This extra texture layer was not applied to character models. The resulting simulation of material detail on game objects was intended to aid the player's suspension of disbelief. For many years after Unreal's release (and Unreal Tournament's release), detail texturing only worked well with the S3 MeTaL and Glide renderer. It was, in fact, disabled in the Direct3D renderer by default (but could be re-enabled in the Unreal.ini file) due to performance and quality issues caused by the driver, while it was present even on hardware many times more powerful than the original S3 Savage3D and 3Dfx Voodoo Graphics.

Because of Unreal's long development time, the course of development occurred during the emergence and rapid progression of hardware 3D accelerators. Along with the advanced software 3D renderer, Unreal was built to take advantage of the 3Dfx Glide API, which emerged as the dominant interface towards the end of the game's development. When Unreal was finally released, Microsoft's Direct3D API was growing rapidly in popularity and Epic was fairly quick to develop a renderer for their game engine. Direct3D renderer, however, released initially to support the new Matrox G200, was less capable and slower than the Glide support, especially in the beginning when it was unstable, slow, and had many graphics quality issues. Unreal also had official OpenGL support.

=== Audio ===
Unreal Introduction theme (Flight Castle)
31-second sample from the intro theme of Unreal, written by Alexander Brandon.

While many game companies went from FM synthesis or General MIDI in the early 1990s to enhanced CD audio and pre-rendered audio, many of the Epic Games used the less common system of module music, composed with a tracker, which used stored PCM sound samples of musical instruments, that would be then played in runtime based on sequencing instructions in the file, to produce music. Epic had been using this technology for other games such as Jazz Jackrabbit and One Must Fall: 2097, which allowed relatively rich music to be stored in files usually smaller than one megabyte. As a module file could be started from different points in its duration and contain multiple different music loops, this technology allowed easy implementation of dynamic music for mood changes in Unreal. The Unreal soundtrack was written by MOD music authors Alexander Brandon and Michiel van den Bos with a few selected tracks by Dan Gardopée and Andrew Sega (Straylight Productions). Unreal's music engine also supports CD audio tracks. The game also made use of the Aureal 3D technology.

=== Community patch support ===
In July 2000 the official support ended with patch 226f by Epic MegaGames. Therefore, with the awareness and permission of Epic, the fan community started the OldUnreal Community patch project based on the original source code in 2008. The patches have come to include features such as support for new graphics APIs like DirectX 9, an updated OpenGL renderer, an OpenAL sound renderer and fixes for many incompatibilities with modern operating systems and hardware. The latest patch iteration, 227j, was released on June 23, 2022, and as of November 2025 work on the next version, 227k, is ongoing.

=== Mac OS ===
The Mac version was released in parallel with the PC version. It supported RAVE hardware acceleration as well as 3DFX's Voodoo, built-in software rendering and, later on, OpenGL rendering. RAVE acceleration support allowed the game to support hardware 3D acceleration with just about every Mac that included it. It also supported Apple's Game Sprockets.

The last update for the Mac OS port was version 224b, which breaks network compatibility between it and the PC version, as well as lacking support for some user-created content made for 225 and 226f. Westlake Interactive, the company responsible for the port, claimed that previous patches were produced voluntarily in their free time, beyond their contractual obligations. They also stated that they did not receive the code for the 225 patch and that it had become unavailable due to Epic moving on to develop version 226.

=== Linux ===
An unofficial content port of the single-player maps to Linux was created by several users of icculus.org, which allowed the Unreal single-player game content to be run as a modification for Unreal Tournament. The online retailer Tux Games at one point sold a box set including the Linux version. The 227 community patch contains a full Linux port for Unreal.

=== Sega Saturn ===
In 2023, one fan has ported the entire first two levels of the game to the Sega Saturn as a tech demo, with plans to port more portions of the game down the line.

== Books ==
Two novels titled Hard Crash and Prophet's Power were published, expanding on the premise and story first introduced in Unreal. Prophet's Power, numbered as the second book in the series, is actually a prequel to the first, Hard Crash, thus it is harder for readers to understand what happened in the story. A book called Escape to Na Pali: A Journey to the Unreal was published on June 23, 2014, written by Kaitlin Tremblay and Alan Williamson.

== Reception ==
=== Sales ===
In the United States, Unreal debuted in third place on PC Data's computer game sales chart for the week ending May 23, 1998, at an average retail price (ARP) of $50. It climbed to first place the following week, while its ARP dropped to $40. Finishing May as the country's second-highest computer game seller of the month, behind StarCraft, Unreal proceeded to alternate with StarCraft between positions 1 and 2 on the weekly charts through the May 31 – June 27 period. Jason Ocampo of Computer Games Strategy Plus characterized the games' competition for first place as a "tug-of-war". Unreal ultimately held at #2 behind StarCraft on the monthly chart for June as a whole, and became the United States' 15th-best-selling computer game of 1998's first half.

Unreal maintained a position in PC Data's weekly top 10 from June 28 through August 1. It continued its streak at second place for July overall, and totaled sales in excess of 120,000 copies in the United States by the end of that month, according to PC Data. IGN described this performance as "a huge hit". In early August, GT Interactive reported that global sales of Unreal had topped 500,000 copies, which contributed to growth at the publisher. The game went on to appear in PC Data's weekly top 10 from August 2 through the week ending September 12, when it fell to #10, and in the monthly top 10 for both August and September. After falling to 19th place for October in total, it exited the monthly top 20. Ultimately, PC Data declared Unreal the United States' 11th-best-selling computer game during the January–November 1998 period.

In the United States, Unreal finished 1998 as the year's 13th-biggest computer game seller, with sales of 291,300 units and revenues of $10.96 million. Its ARP for the year was $38. According to GameDaily, the game's sales in the United States reached 350,000 units by January 1999. Worldwide sales surpassed one million units by September 1999, and reached 1.5 million copies by November 2002.

=== Critical response ===
Reception

Aggregate score
Aggregator	Score
GameRankings	89%

Review scores
Publication	Score
AllGame	4.5/5
Computer and Video Games	9/10
Edge	8/10
GamePro	4.5/5
GameRevolution	B+
GameSpot	8.4/10
IGN	9/10
Next Generation	5/5
PC Gamer (UK)	94/100
PC Zone	9.3/10
Macworld	4.5/5
Thunderbolt	9/10

Unreal received positive reviews upon release. Critics praised the graphics, gameplay, music, atmosphere, enemy behavior, and bot support in multiplayer mode, but criticized the lag-ridden online multiplayer mode.

Macworld's Michael Gowan wrote: "This 3-D shoot-'em-up reinvigorates a tired genre. Plot, atmosphere, and exploration mix with ferocious enemies to make this game stand out from the pack".

Next Generation gave five stars out of five for the PC version of the game, and called it the best action game for the platform. In 2018 CNET praised the game at its 20th anniversary.

=== Accolades ===
In 1998, PC Gamer US declared Unreal the 13th-best computer game ever released.

List of awards and nominations
Year	Publication	Category	Result	Ref.
1998	Academy of Interactive Arts & Sciences	PC Action Game of the Year	Nominated	
1998	Computer Games Strategy Plus	Action Game of the Year	Nominated	
