= Unreal Tournament 2003 =

2002 video game

- Developers: Epic Games; Digital Extremes
- Publishers: Infogrames (Note: Released under the Atari brand name.); MacSoft (OS X)
- Designers: Cliff Bleszinski; James Schmalz; Shane Caudle
- Programmer: Steve Polge
- Composers: Kevin Riepl; Starsky Partridge
- Series: Unreal
- Engine: Unreal Engine 2
- Platforms: Windows, Mac OS X, Linux
- Release: Windows: NA: September 30, 2002; EU: October 4, 2002; AU: October 16, 2002; Mac OS X: NA: June 20, 2003; Linux: EU: October 4, 2002
- Genre: First-person shooter
- Modes: Single-player, multiplayer

Unreal Tournament 2003 is a first-person arena shooter video game developed by Epic Games and Digital Extremes, and published by Infogrames under the Atari brand name. The game is part of the Unreal franchise, and is a sequel to 1999's Unreal Tournament. Like its predecessor, the game is designed mainly for multiplayer gaming.

The game saw a record 1.2 million downloads when the demo was released. In addition, the Unreal Engine has been widely licensed for games such as the Tom Clancy's Rainbow Six series, Splinter Cell, and America's Army.

An Xbox port, Unreal Championship was released on November 12, 2002. Unreal Tournament 2003 would be rereleased as Unreal Tournament 2004, which was released on March 16 of that year.

== Gameplay ==
The available combat modes are:

- Deathmatch: Frag other players as much as possible to gain the highest score.
- Team Deathmatch: Two teams go head to head to be the best fragger.
- Capture the Flag: Players must invade the enemies' base, capture their flag and bring it back to their base in order to score.
- Double Domination: Two teams must control two points on the map. Holding both locations for a certain period of time gives points to the controlling team.
- Bombing Run: The player with the ball has to take it into enemy territory and score in the enemy force's goal. Players can pass to other teammates. Getting killed causes the ball carrier to fumble the ball. The ball launcher is used to carry the ball; it is not a weapon but heals the carrying player when they are at low health. Three points are awarded for field goals (shooting the ball through the goal), and 7 points are given for touchdowns (carrying the ball through the goal), although the levels are often designed such that this kills the ball carrier.
- Last Man Standing: All players in this gametype spawn with a limited number of lives. The last remaining player to still have lives wins the match.
- Invasion: A co-op gametype in which the players attempt to kill the invading alien AI. Each player has one life.
- Mutant: Mutant is similar to a "Juggernaut" or a "King of the Hill" type of gameplay. The first person to make a kill becomes the mutant, which gives them unlimited ammo, camouflage, and super speed. The mutant then tries to get as many kills as he can until he is killed. The person who kills the mutant then becomes the mutant.

== Reception ==
Reception

Aggregate score
Aggregator	Score
Metacritic	86/100

Review scores
Publication	Score
GameSpot	8.8/10
IGN	9/10
PC Magazine	4/5

GameSpot named Unreal Tournament 2003 the best computer game of October 2002.

Unreal Tournament 2003 won GameSpot's annual "Best Graphics (Technical) on PC" award, and was nominated in the "Best Multiplayer Action Game on PC" category. During the 6th Annual Interactive Achievement Awards, the game received a nomination for "Outstanding Achievement in Visual Engineering" by the Academy of Interactive Arts & Sciences.

=== Sales ===
In the United States, Unreal Tournament 2003 sold 360,000 copies and earned $13.6 million by August 2006. At the time, this led Edge to declare it the country's 45th-best-selling computer game, and best-selling Unreal title, released since January 2000. Combined sales of all Unreal computer games released between January 2000 and August 2006 had reached 1.8 million units in the United States by the latter date. In December 2002, the game received a "Gold" sales award from the Verband der Unterhaltungssoftware Deutschland (VUD), indicating sales of at least 100,000 units across Germany, Austria and Switzerland.

In its first month, Unreal Tournament 2003 sold more than 800,000 copies worldwide.
