= Extreme Pinball =

1995 video game

- Developers: Epic MegaGames; Digital Extremes; High Score Entertainment
- Publisher: Electronic Arts
- Platforms: DOS, PlayStation
- Release: DOS; October 1995; PlayStation: NA: 28 March 1996; PAL: 5 April 1996
- Genre: Pinball
- Modes: Single-player, multiplayer

Extreme Pinball is a 1995 pinball video game published by Electronic Arts for DOS and PlayStation. It was the first game developed by Digital Extremes, though founder James Schmalz had also previously created Solar Winds, Silverball and Epic Pinball in 1993. It was released via PlayStation Network in 2010.

== Development ==
Three tables were designed by Terry Cumming, including "Rock Fantasy".

All the music tracks for this game were made by Robert A. Allen.

== Reception ==
Reception

Review scores
Publication	Score
AllGame	2.5/5 (PS1)
PlayStation: The Official Magazine	3/10
Maximum	2/5 (PS1)

Extreme Pinball received generally negative reviews. Reviewing the PlayStation version, Rich Leadbetter of Maximum commented that "the tables on offer in Extreme Pinball are just too dull. Take a look at the latest pinball tables and you see very flashy, licensed affairs with lashings of special effects and sampled sounds... all of which you won't find in Extreme Pinball". He also criticized the prominent borders in the PAL conversion. A brief review in GamePro stated "Neither as fast nor as polished as Last Gladiators for the Saturn, Extreme Pinball is strangely reminiscent of Ruiner Pinball for the Jaguar or the old Time Cruise for the TurboGrafx-16. Not a lot of 32-bit technology went into this standard game, and not a lot of fun comes out of it".
