= Soulframe =

Upcoming video game

- Storefront artwork featuring a Player Envoy; behind whom stands the Omen Wolf, Orengall.
- Developer: Digital Extremes
- Publisher: Digital Extremes
- Directors: Geoff Crookes; Steve Sinclair
- Designers: Scott McGregor; Joe Buck
- Artist: Rosa Lee
- Writer: Sydney Hills
- Composers: Keith Power; George Spanos
- Engine: Evolution
- Platforms: Windows; Xbox Series X/S; PlayStation 5
- Release: Windows; December 2023 (Pre-alpha) TBA (Full release); PS5, Xbox Series X/S, TBA
- Genres: Action role-playing, MMOG
- Modes: Single-player, multiplayer

Soulframe is an upcoming free-to-play action role-playing massive multiplayer online game developed and published by Digital Extremes. It is currently available to play on Microsoft Windows, and Digital Extremes plan to release it on both Xbox Series X/S and PlayStation 5 once it is out of alpha.

== Plot ==
Soulframe is set on Alca, a world that lives and breathes with the spirit of nature, and the ancient magicks of the Fey. Yet Alca is under violent occupation by the Ode, a technologically advanced colonising force from the distant cosmos. Their mercenaries, the Sinecure, have descended from their Skytowers to strip Alca of her flesh and remake the world in the corrupted vision of their home.

The player takes control of the Envoy - a warrior bearing a blue Pact Arm infused with magicks of the ancient Fey, dedicated to protecting Alca and her people from outside threat. Once a thrall to the Ode, the Envoy must now earn their redemption and seek to restore their severed bonds to the world.

== Gameplay ==
Three player Envoys defend the isle of Midrath against a group of Sinecure.

Soulframe is an online action role-playing game that includes adventure and MMO-lite elements. Played from a third-person perspective, the game is set in an open-world environment featuring the fictional world of Alca, as well as the skies above.

The current Preludes build takes place on the isle of Midrath, and as the Player Envoy explores the isle they must learn to slay powerful foes, and uncover both the secrets and treasures of this ravaged land. The open world is explored using the Envoy's giant wolf mount as the main mode of transportation, unlocked a short way into the game; though players may also use fast travel at the cost of a harvestable item called Wevetseeds. Throughout the game, players encounter non-player characters (NPCs) and enemies, including farmable bosses known as Agari.

Aside from its main open world, Soulframe has numerous procedurally-generated dungeons; including catacombs, tunnels, and an underground city, where players can fight bosses and complete puzzles to acquire rare loot.

During the game's tutorial sequence, the player chooses a Pact, which provides a small bundle of starter gear. This is not to be confused with a character class, and regardless of initial Pact selection, every player gains access to all equipment, abilities, and attributes as they explore the world.

== Development ==
Release timeline
| 2022 | Announcement |
| 2023 | Preludes Launch |
| 2024 | Preludes 1.1 |
| 2024 | Preludes 1.2 |
| 2024 | Preludes 1.3 |
| 2024 | Preludes 4 |
| 2024 | Preludes 5 |
| 2024 | Preludes 6 |
| 2024 | Preludes 7 |
| 2025 | Preludes 8 |
| 2025 | Preludes 9 |
| 2025 | Preludes 10 |
| 2025 | Preludes 11: The Waste Bear |
| 2025 | Preludes 12: Founders |
| 2025 | Thawtide |
| 2026 | Preludes 13: A Triquetra of Virtues |
| 2026 | Preludes 14: The Duelo |
| 2026 | Preludes 14.5: Ode'n Tempers |
| 2026 | Preludes 15: Gods & Ghosts |
| 2026 | Preludes 16: Of Hook & Hound |
| 2026 | Preludes 17: Verse of the Veilands |
| 2027 | Preludes 18 (Date TBA) |
| TBA | Steam release |
| TBA | Xbox Series X/S and PlayStation 5 launch |

Soulframe is developed by the Canadian studio Digital Extremes, best known for Warframe, and is freely playable on PC via its open Pre-alpha, titled Soulframe Preludes.

Soulframe was first publicly revealed via a cinematic trailer at TennoCon in July 2022. It then became playable in December 2023 with the release of its first Preludes build, though began as invite-only. Access to Preludes was granted regularly via both email (to 2,000 randomly selected invitees every Wednesday at 5PM CET) or Twitch Drops available via regular streams, with a guaranteed access code provided to every viewer.

Furthermore, Preludes was twice opened to the public during TennoCon - Digital Extremes' annual fan convention - in July 2025 and 2026, granting permanent access to any user with an existing account, and to those who signed up by the end of that week. On 6th November 2026, Soulframe Preludes was permanently opened to the public, with a release titled Open Preludes.

On November 25, 2025, the Founders program was launched, allowing players to purchase bundles that provide access to Preludes, along with exclusive in-game items. The Founders program is expected to continue until later in 2026, and will also be available at the time of the game's release on consoles.

Soulframe's latest major update, Preludes 17: Verse of the Veilands, was released on 5th November, 2026.
