= Solar Winds =

1993 video game

- Developer: Stone Interactive Media
- Publisher: Epic MegaGames
- Designer: James Schmalz
- Platform: MS-DOS
- Release: WW: 1993
- Genre: Multidirectional shooter
- Mode: Single-player

Solar Winds: The Escape and its sequel Solar Winds: Galaxy (also known as Solar Winds II: Universe) are top-down, space-themed role-playing action games developed by James Schmalz and published by Epic MegaGames in 1993.

The main character of both games, bounty hunter Jake Stone, takes on a series of missions that has him shipping cargo and fending off attackers. The story is told through simple conversations and brief cutscenes. In some ways, the series is reminiscent of Star Control II, without the ship customization and fleet building aspects.

== Gameplay ==
A typical game in progress. To the right are the radar (showing the player's co-ordinates) and the weapons configuration subpanel.

Gameplay is presented in a top-down view. The focus is always on Stone's ship. The keyboard or a joystick is used to navigate the ship and fire weapons (which consist of lasers and missiles). Mice are also supported. Many functions, such as scans, communication, and power distribution, are controlled by the control panel. The player can zoom out to see details, the amount of which depends on how much power is allocated to sensors.

Power is allocated to various ship's systems, such as shields, weapons, life support, engines, and is consumed by the hyperdrive, whose maximum speed is determined by engine power allocation. Hull integrity is shown through a square superimposed on top of the ship. Over time, the ship will repair itself, the speed of which depending on how much power has been dedicated to the life support systems. The waveforms of shields and weapons can be adjusted. The specific waveform selected for a laser blast or shield configuration dictates their effectiveness against each other. Lasers can be set to fire for either one, two, or three laser cannons firing simultaneously.

Communication is implemented in the form of the other party talking and the player selecting a response.

Items in the player's cargo hold can be transported to planets and other ships. In the first episode, many missions involve delivering cargo in return for useful items.

== Development ==
Solar Winds was the first major title designed by James Schmalz. As a young developer, his simple motivation was to develop a game that is fun to make. He created Solar Winds based on inspiration from the game Star Control II, as well as his love of the science fiction series Star Trek: The Next Generation. Released by shareware publisher Epic MegaGames, Solar Winds became successful enough that Schmalz could afford to develop his next games for Epic: Epic Pinball, Extreme Pinball, and eventually, Unreal.

== Plot ==
In The Escape, humans live in a planetary system millions of light years from Earth. Space travel is common, but hyperdrive research is restricted: any research pertaining to hyperdrive travel is destroyed by the oppressive solar government. However, one group has spent a decade in secret developing a hyperdrive ship and plans to use it to escape the force field encasing their planetary system. The government hires Stone to stop them.

It is eventually revealed that the solar government is conspiring with a race of superior aliens to stop the development of hyperdrive technology. These aliens keep species for study, and push these species toward war. Travel to other planetary systems is barred by invisible force fields around the systems. The aliens and their agents travel by means of fixed, self-made portals, opened with special keys. Ultimately, Stone is able to travel through one of the portals where he is greeted by an alien agitator, who seeks his assistance to bring to an end the cruel treatment of these species.

In Universe, Jake Stone continues his work with these agitators to disrupt the portals. Meanwhile, a human colony fleet from Earth is heading for the force field surrounding the Solar System (Earth's planetary system). Ultimately Stone is able to work for the enemy to get close enough to destroy the Controller that maintains the force fields and portals, thus freeing these worlds.

== Reception ==
Computer Gaming World's Chuck Miller in 1993 approved of Solar Winds's combination of action, strategy, and role-playing, and said that the game "is an exceptional product and worth the $30 registration fee". In 2013, Richard Cobbett of PC Gamer complained about the lack of content and also said it takes too long to get between destinations.

== Soundtrack ==
The music for the game was composed by Dan Froelich using FM Synthesis.
