= Warframe =

2013 video game

- Storefront artwork with four of the game's playable Warframes (left to right): Excalibur, Ember, Loki, and Rhino.
- Developer: Digital Extremes (Note: iOS version developed by Blind Squirrel Games)
- Publisher: Digital Extremes
- Directors: Rebecca Ford; Pablo Alonso; Megan Everett; Steve Sinclair (former); Scott McGregor (former)
- Producers: Dave Kudirka; Pat Kudirka
- Designers: Ben Edney; Mitch Gladney; Joey Adey; Jonathan Gogul
- Programmers: James Silvia-Rogers; Glen Miner
- Artists: Michael Brennan; Ron Davey; Mat Tremblay; Geoff Crookes
- Writer: Adrian Bott
- Composers: Keith Power; George Spanos; Jason Graves; Matthew Chalmers; Erich Preston
- Engine: Evolution
- Platforms: Windows; PlayStation 4; Xbox One; Nintendo Switch; PlayStation 5; Xbox Series X/S; iOS; Android; Nintendo Switch 2
- Release: March 25, 2013: Windows; March 25, 2013; PlayStation 4; NA: November 15, 2013; PAL: November 29, 2013 Xbox One; September 2, 2014; Nintendo Switch; November 20, 2018; PlayStation 5; November 26, 2020; Xbox Series X/S; April 14, 2021; iOS; February 20, 2024; Android; Canada: February 11, 2026; WW: February 18, 2026; Nintendo Switch 2; March 25, 2026
- Genres: Action role-playing, third-person shooter, MMOG
- Modes: Single-player, multiplayer

Warframe is a free-to-play action role-playing third-person shooter multiplayer online game developed and published by Digital Extremes. First released for Windows in March 2013, it was later ported to PlayStation 4 in November 2013, Xbox One in September 2014, Nintendo Switch in November 2018, PlayStation 5 in November 2020, Xbox Series X/S in April 2021, iOS in February 2024, Android in Canada on February 11, 2026 followed by a global release on February 18, 2026, and was released on Nintendo Switch 2 on March 25, 2026. Support for cross-platform play was released in 2022. Cross-platform save began in December 2023, rolling out in waves to different groups of players before becoming fully available to all players in January 2024.

In Warframe, a player controls a member of the Tenno, a caste of ancient warriors who have awoken from centuries of suspended animation far into Earth's future to find themselves at war with different factions in the Origin System. The Tenno use biomechanical combat units called Warframes, along with a variety of weapons and abilities, to complete missions. While many of the game's missions use procedurally generated levels, it also includes large open world areas similar to other massively multiplayer online games, as well as some story-specific missions with fixed level design. The game includes elements of shooting and melee games, parkour, and role-playing to allow players to advance their Tenno with improved gear. The game features both player versus environment and player versus player elements. It is supported by microtransactions, allowing players to purchase in-game items with money, while also offering the option to earn them at no cost through grinding.

The concept for Warframe originated in 2000 when Digital Extremes began work on a new game titled Dark Sector. At the time, the company had been successful in supporting other developers and publishers but wanted to develop its own game in-house. Dark Sector suffered several delays and was eventually released in 2008, incorporating some of the initial framework but differing significantly from the original plan. By 2012, in the wake of the success of free-to-play games, the developers took their earlier Dark Sector ideas and art assets and incorporated them into a new project, their self-published Warframe.

Initially, the growth of Warframe was slow, hindered by moderate critical reviews and low player counts. However, since its release, the game has experienced significant growth. It is one of Digital Extremes' most successful titles, reaching nearly 50 million registered players by 2019.

== Plot ==
Warframe is set in a far future version of the Solar System, now known as the Origin System. At the start of the game players are given control of members of the Tenno, warriors who have awoken from a millennia-long cryosleep on Earth by a woman called the Lotus, who acts as a guide for the player. They join an interplanetary war between the Grineer, a violent war-driven matriarchal race of militarized human clones; the Corpus, a cult-like megacorporation dedicated to profit; the Infested, disfigured victims of a zombie-like virus; the Sentients, a race of self-replicating machines made by a long-dead transhuman race known as the Orokin; and the Corrupted, brainwashed variants of the previous three factions' units defending ancient Orokin towers.

All of the factions encountered in the game, including the Tenno, were created by or are splinter groups of the old Orokin Empire, an ancient fallen civilization and former reigning power in the Origin System. Although virtually all of them are long dead by the time of the Tenno's awakening, their lingering presence can still be felt throughout the Origin System. Before their fall, the Orokin had realized the Origin System was becoming dangerously depleted of resources, and their solution to keep their empire alive was to colonize new star systems. The Orokin sent out colony ships through the Void, a trans-dimensional space that enabled faster than light travel between stellar systems. They had also sent out the Sentients beforehand, to arrive in the Tau system first, and terraform it, so the colonists would arrive to garden worlds, capable of supporting human life. None of these residential ships returned, and those they had loaded with Sentients returned with the Sentients now deciding to wipe out the Orokin, leading to the Old War, the creation of the Tenno, and the collapse of the Empire.

The player discovers that the Lotus is a Sentient known as Natah, rebelling against her own kind to protect the Tenno, desiring to have surrogate children after losing her ability to procreate. The Lotus' father, Hunhow, sends an assassin called the Stalker to Lua (the remains of Earth's Moon), which the Lotus had hidden in the Void, to find its secret. The Lotus dispatches the Tenno to stop the Stalker, arriving too late as the Stalker unveils the entity that the Lotus had protected: a human child known as the Operator, who is the real Tenno controlling the Warframes through the course of the game. The Operator is one of several Tenno children that survived the passage of the Zariman Ten Zero colony ship through the Void; the adults having all gone mad from its travel. When the ship returned to the Orokin Empire, the children had all been put to sleep for thousands of years, outlasting the fall of the Empire, to be found by the Lotus and becoming the Tenno (Tenno short for the "Ten Zero" of the ship's name). The power of the Void gave these children the power to control Warframes.

Throughout various updates, various quests have been released after the Second Dream that elaborates on the story. "The War Within" quest introduced the Grineer Queens, rulers of the Grineer, and their asteroid-based Kuva Fortress, also giving the Operator the ability to act fully on their own as another playable entity, rather than a single-use attack. Quests afterward would introduce figures such as "The Man In The Wall," a mysterious entity, presumably from the Void, who takes on the visage of whoever sees them, most often as the playable Operator, and Ballas, one of the last living Orokin, responsible for creating the Warframes.

== Gameplay ==
Warframe is an online action game that includes elements of shooters, RPGs, and stealth games.

The player starts with a silent protagonist in the form of an anthropomorphic biomechanical combat unit called a Warframe, possessing supernatural agility and special abilities, a selection of weapons (primary, secondary, and melee) and a space ship called an Orbiter. The Orbiter is supported by a Cephalon, a type of artificial intelligence created from the minds of living people. The Cephalon in the player's Orbiter is named Ordis, and refers to the player as Operator. The player's primary goal from this point is to explore the Origin System. Later in the course of the game, the player unlocks the ability to gain direct control of the Operator, the Tenno's true physical form. The Operator can physically manifest themselves in the environment by projecting out of the Warframe, and disappear by resuming control of it through a telekinetic process called Transference. The Operator also possesses weapons and abilities of their own. After that, the Operator can use Transference to control a larger, purely mechanical combat unit called a Necramech, the technological precursor to the Warframes. Players can engage in aerial or space-bound combat using an auxiliary combat platform called Archwing, mounted on a Warframe, which comes with a unique set of abilities. Archguns are heavy weapons designed for Archwings and Necramechs, but can be adapted for Warframe use. Late in 2019, an update to the game allowed players to pilot and manage a spacefaring gunship called the Railjack, which is deployed in combat, unlike the Orbiter. Railjack was designed as a co-op experience with up to four people working together, performing different tasks to keep the ship operational while destroying enemy ships and completing objectives. A Railjack-focused update was released in 2021, which brought expanded content and a new skill tree system aimed at making solo play more accessible.

Through the Orbiter's console, the player can select any of the missions available to them. To progress through the Solar System, players must complete mission nodes on each planet to reach Junctions, and use these Junctions to travel to other planets. Other missions rotate over time as part of the game's living universe; these can include missions with special rewards and community challenges to allow all players to reap benefits if they are successfully met. High-difficulty daily and weekly challenges offer rare rewards. Aboard the Orbiter, the player can manage their arsenal of equipment, customize their Warframes and weapons, craft new equipment, and access the in-game marketplace. Missions can be played alone or with up to four players in a player versus environment cooperative manner, and are generally played on procedurally generated maps. Missions have various objectives, such as defeating a certain number of enemies (Exterminate), stealing data from terminals without raising enemy alarms (Spy), rescuing and escorting prisoners (Rescue), or defending points on the map for set periods (Defense). Later updates have added three large open-field environments where the player can accept bounties composed of several missions in succession; and a fourth open-field environment named Duviri, where the player must take control of the Operator's alternate-timeline self, the Drifter, and complete a series of objectives before slaying an ancient mechanical beast known as an Orowyrm.

Players can use their weapons, abilities, and several parkour maneuvers to navigate through the area and defeat enemies within the mission. Upon losing all health, a player becomes downed; an ally may revive them, or a player may revive themselves a limited number of times per mission. Once the mission is complete, players are rewarded with in-game items, as well as in-game currency and items picked up while exploring the map; failure to complete a mission causes these rewards to be lost. In addition to cooperative missions, the game includes player versus player (PvP) content through the multiplayer Conclave, which also rewards the player for placing highly in such matches.

New Warframes, weapons, and other gear items are primarily acquired through equipment blueprints, which are then used to build the specified item in the Orbiter's Foundry. Blueprints and their resulting equipment may also be purchased directly using Platinum, the game's premium currency that can be traded for with other players for rare items in-game, or be purchased via microtransactions. Players need to have specific quantities of construction resources, found from missions and their rewards, to build these items. Players and their equipment also gain experience and level up from missions; equipment with higher levels support more Mods, abstracted upgrades (presented as cards in the game's UI) that can be slotted into the equipment to improve or customize its performance. Mods are rarely dropped by enemies during missions, and can also be mission rewards, traded between players, or purchased from NPC merchants. The most advanced weapon mods, called 'Riven Mods,' have randomized stats, based on a prefix/suffix system characteristic of ARPGs, and frequently have negative values. Alongside mods, players have other means of improving their equipment, including Orokin Catalysts and Reactors, which double total mod capacity, and conditional advanced upgrades like Exilus Adapters, Arcane Enhancements, and Valence Fusion. Arcane Enhancements are equippable items that grant conditional stat bonuses to Warframes and weapons, such as restoring energy on kills or boosting damage after reloading. They are obtained through endgame activities and can be ranked up by combining duplicates, to a maximum of rank five. Valence Fusion is a system that allows players to transfer the elemental damage bonus from one Kuva, Tenet or Coda weapon to a duplicate of the same weapon, retaining the higher of the two values and enabling players to optimize their preferred weapon variant.

Most items stop gaining levels and experience points at rank 30, at which point an item called Forma may be used to customize its capacity for mods, and reset it to rank 0. Raising the rank of a weapon or Warframe for the first time, completing Origin System missions for the first time, and various other milestones add to the player's 'Mastery Rank'. This is a loose indicator of the player's overall progress through the game. Upon reaching an experience point threshold, the player may attempt a challenge to be promoted to the next rank. Many items require a certain mastery rank before they may be purchased in-game or built in the Foundry, but items purchased with Platinum may be used regardless of rank. Ranks 0-30 have associated titles, such as "Gold Tiger" or "Silver Sage"; rank 30 is "True Master", after which each further rank is referred to as 'Legendary Rank' instead, and bears no title. As new items are constantly being added, the highest possible legendary rank is subject to change over time. Raising mastery rank expands a player's maximum capacity for certain currencies among other rewards.

Warframe is designed to be free-to-play, and has avoided using pay to win elements; all Warframes, weapons, and other non-cosmetic equipment can be acquired in-game over time through normal gameplay, which may involve grinding. Spending the in-game currency can simplify and quicken the process. New weapons, Warframes, equipment, and blueprints to construct such equipment and cosmetics like skins and capes (called Syandanas) can be purchased in the market, using either Credits, which are earned in-game, or Platinum. Some cosmetic items can only be obtained through in-game payments. However, some indirect upgrades can only be bought with Platinum, such as arsenal slots for Warframes, weapons, and certain other equipment, though they can be unlocked via a "Nightwave" battle pass-esque reward system, which is completely free. The premium currency Platinum can be acquired for free by trading for it with other players using certain in-game items.

== Development ==
=== Dark Sector as a precursor ===
The origins of Warframe came out of Canadian studio Digital Extremes' original vision for their previous game Dark Sector. Before that point, Digital Extremes was known as a work-for-hire studio, working alongside other studios to help complete development; this included working with Epic Games for Unreal Tournament (1999) and its sequels Unreal Tournament 2003 and Unreal Tournament 2004. Epic had looked to bring Digital Extremes into their studio, but found there would be issues with the Canadian government that interfered with the merger, and the studios agreed to go their separate ways. This was the major reason the physical disc copy for the game was discontinued.

Wanting to establish themselves as a lead studio, Digital Extremes came up with the idea of Dark Sector, which they first announced in February 2000, describing the game as combining "the intense action elements of Unreal Tournament with the scope and character evolution of a persistent online universe". In early interviews, Digital Extremes said that the gameplay for Dark Sector would have had players as bounty hunters and assassins in a dark science fiction setting, with each character having a bounty on their head, making them targets for other players.

The studio used their vision of Dark Sector to try to secure a publisher, but this only led to more offers for work-for-hire. The company remained quiet on Dark Sector for about four years, re-announcing in early 2004 a revised Dark Sector, now to be a stylish, science-fiction single player experience with stealth elements inspired by the Metal Gear Solid series, and a story they considered a mix of Metal Gear Solid and The Dark Crystal set in space, within a larger setting like that of Frank Herbert's Dune universe. Much of the game's art style was informed by the French artist Jean Giraud, aka Moebius. The player-character, belonging to a race called the Tenno, and enemies would wear high-tech suits that would give them unique abilities. This re-announcement included a scripted demo to show their vision of the game's gameplay and graphics. The game was announced just as both the first consoles of the seventh generation, the Xbox 360 and PlayStation 3, had been teased, and Digital Extremes started to look for a publisher to release the games on these platforms. The game received a good deal of attention from its video, including coverage by CNN on the upcoming console generation.

Digital Extremes' creative director Steve Sinclair spent about a year on the road following the re-announcement of Dark Sector to find a publisher, but most rejected the idea; Sinclair said most publishers were not impressed with the science fiction setting and instead encouraged them to change the setting to modern-day, within World War II (which was popular at the time due to the Call of Duty series), and even the American Civil War. When Sinclair returned to the studio, they tried to rework the setting, even trying a superhero genre, without luck. Matters were complicated as they were also attempting to develop their engine, the Evolution engine, to support the game and the new consoles, switching away from the familiar Unreal Engine. Ultimately, Digital Extremes dropped most of the science fiction elements, and moved the gameplay towards a more Resident Evil survivor-horror approach. Digital Extremes did keep one element of the original concept for the released game, that is the protagonist named "Tenno". The Dark Sector released in 2008 was far different from their original vision. Dark Sector received average reviews, and was not a major financial windfall for the studio, leading them back to doing work for hire over the next four years, including BioShock, BioShock 2, Homefront, and The Darkness 2.

=== Production ===
Around 2011, Digital Extremes were finding themselves struggling for work-for-hire contracts. While the studio had been forced to issue some layoffs, they were still at about 250 people at this time. Looking again to develop their IP and to try to take advantage of the growth in free-to-play games, Digital Extremes looked back to the original Dark Sector concept from 2004 and looked to develop it as a free-to-play game. This decision was made in early 2012 and required the team to create a prototype within one to two months, as Sinclair and Digital Extremes' CEO James Schmalz were going to shop the game around to publishers at that year's Game Developers Conference in March 2012. They took several assets from the abandoned 2004 concept, and developed this as Warframe. At GDC, Sinclair and Schmalz found publishers still cold on the idea: Western publishers were not keen on the science fiction setting, while a large unnamed Korean publisher warned him they would "fail" as Western developers did not know how to properly support free-to-play games with quality content. Another concern raised by these publishers was that Warframe was based on player-versus-environmental gameplay, which differed significantly with other free-to-play titles at the time that were mostly player-versus-player. Disheartened, they returned to the studio and decided that they would publish Warframe on their own. They built out a playable version of the game, at the time known as Lotus in about nine months. Alongside this, the studio developed the necessary server architecture to support the game and the microtransaction system they had envisioned for it.

In October 2024, shortly after the release of the update Koumei and the Five Fates, British developer Sumo Digital announced their involvement in content updates for Warframe, having developed the warframe Koumei herself as well as weapons and cosmetics for the game. As of October 2025, Sumo Digital remains involved in developing content for the game, having co-developed all major updates since the start of the partnership.

Since as early as 2015, Digital Extremes has incorporated user-created content into the game under the term "Tennogen". Users submit their models to Digital Extremes to review for appropriateness and aesthetics within the Warframe universe. A handful are selected over a year and added to the game as purchasable content, with 30% of the revenue going to the original artist.

== Status ==
Release timeline
2013	PC Launch
2013	Stormbringer
2013	Rise of the Warlords
2013	Vor's Revenge
2013	Operation: Sling-Stone
2013	Operation: Arid Fear
2013	Shadows of the Dead
2013	The Gradivus Dilemma
2013	Valkyr Unleashed
2013	PS4 Launch
2014	Operation: Oxium Espionage
2014	Zephyr Rises
2014	The Gustrag Three
2014	Operation: Tethra's Doom
2014	Dark Sectors
2014	Specters of Liberty
2014	Pack Hunters
2014	Operation: Breeding Grounds
2014	The Mad Cephalon
2014	Operation: Cryotic Front
2015	Stolen Dreams
2015	Sanctuary
2015	The New Protocols
2015	Operation: Tubemen of Regor
2015	Echoes of the Sentient
2015	The Jordas Precept
2015	The Second Dream
2015	Ring of Fire
2016	Operation: Rathuum
2016	Specters of the Rail
2016	The Silver Grove
2016	Recurring Nightmares
2016	Recurring Dreams
2016	The War Within
2016	The Glast Gambit
2017	Operation: The Pacifism Defect
2017	Octavia's Anthem
2017	Chains of Harrow
2017	Plains of Eidolon
2017	Operation: Plague Star
2018	Shrine of the Eidolon
2018	Beasts of the Sanctuary
2018	The Sacrifice
2018	Mask of the Revenant
2018	Chimera
2018	Fortuna
2018	Nintendo Switch Launch
2019	Nightwave Series 1: The Wolf of Saturn Six
2019	Operation: Buried Debts
2019	The Jovian Concord
2019	Saint of Altra
2019	Nightwave Series 2: The Emissary
2019	The Old Blood
2019	Rising Tide
2019	Empyrean
2020	Operation: Scarlet Spear
2020	Nightwave Series 3: The Glassmaker
2020	The Deadlock Protocol
2020	The Steel Path
2020	Derelict Shift
2020	The Heart of Deimos
2020	Deimos: Arcana
2020	PS5 Launch
2020	Operation: Orphix Venom
2021	Corpus Proxima
2021	Xbox Series X/S Launch
2021	Call of the Tempestarii
2021	Sisters of Parvos
2021	Prime Resurgence
2021	The New War
2022	Angels of the Zariman
2022	Veilbreaker
2022	Lua's Prey
2022	Cross-Platform Play
2023	Citrine's Last Wish
2023	The Duviri Paradox
2023	The Seven Crimes of Kullervo
2023	Abyss of Dagath
2023	Whispers in the Walls
2023	Operation: Gargoyle's Cry
2024	Cross-Platform Save
2024	iOS Launch
2024	Dante Unbound
2024	Jade Shadows
2024	Operation: Belly of the Beast
2024	The Lotus Eaters
2024	Koumei & the Five Fates
2024	1999
2025	Techrot Encore
2025	Isleweaver
2025	The Vallis Undermind
2025	The Old Peace
2025	Operation: Blood of Perita
2026	Android Launch
2026	The Shadowgrapher
2026	Operation: Atramentum
2026	Nintendo Switch 2 Launch
2026	Jade Shadows: Constellations
2026	Amir's Shockwave
2026	Iceblade of Narin
2026	Epoch Operation: Taubound
2026	Tau

=== Original release ===
Warframe was publicly announced in June 2012 with its closed beta launched in October 2012. Player feedback helped to refine the game's structure. An early change in the beta in early 2013 was their monetization scheme to avoid pay to win scenarios. For example, initially, each Warframe had a skill tree that the player could unlock completely through missions and gaining experience. An extended version of the tree was available if the player augmented the Warframe with an in-game item, then only purchasable through microtransactions. When players complained about this feature, they stripped the pay-to-win elements and adopted the mantra of keeping the game free to play, requiring that players did not have to spend any money to get an item within the game. To support the game, they borrowed the idea of offering for sale "Founder's Packs" that would grant in-game items and currency, an idea that had been successfully used on Kickstarter projects.

Digital Extremes found it difficult to get attention from the press as around 2012–2013, free-to-play games were typically shunned by game journalists. Unfavorable comparisons had been made to Destiny, a highly anticipated title due out in 2014, that also tarnished Warframe's presence. Coupled with low player counts, Digital Extremes were not sure how long they could continue supporting the game. However, Digital Extremes found they had a small but dedicated group of players that latched onto the title, buying into the game through Founder's Packs, telling their friends about the game, and interacting with the developers to provide feedback which was integrated into the game's design. Further, they discovered that when popular streamers like TotalBiscuit covered the beta, they drew more players to the game.

The open beta for Warframe launched in March 2013 for the Windows platform, with the game available from their server systems. Warframe was released at the same time that the studio was also completing development for the April 2013 Star Trek game to tie into the release of the film Star Trek Into Darkness. The Star Trek game was critically panned, leading to financial hardships at the studio and forcing them to lay off developers. Warframe itself was not a critical hit with gaming publications, receiving average reviews; as IGN reviewed in 2013, the game was "fun, but a little bland".

Digital Extremes was planning to release Warframe for the PlayStation 4 as well, but that console was not available until November 2013, so to try to get more players, they decided to offer the game on Steam, which further grew the player base. Some days after the Steam launch, Digital Extremes had been able to start drawing in enough funding to maintain the viability of the studio. The PlayStation 4 version was released at the console's launch in November 2013, The Xbox One version of the game launched on September 2, 2014. The PS4 version was ported to Japan on February 22, 2014, followed by the Xbox One version on September 2, 2014.

=== Perpetual beta ===
Once the game turned profitable, Digital Extremes found themselves in the position of needing to generate content for the game to maintain its audience. Because they retained their 250-person staff throughout this process, they were able to expand upon content quickly and soon hired another 250 developers for Warframe. Community input was critical for Digital Extremes for new content and improvements. One major change after release was an update to the game's movement system, titled "Parkour 2.0", which was released in 2015. They had found before this, players discover ways to rapidly traverse levels by a trick known as "coptering" using specific weapons, Warframes, and upgrades. Though Digital Extremes had considered these movements to be game-breaking and considered removing the abilities altogether, they realized players liked to have exotic moves like this available to them and thus created the Parkour 2.0 system that, while reining in how extensive these moves could be, fully supported the type of ninja-like movements that players wanted. Another example was a short-lived feature that allowed players to spend a small amount of the premium in-game currency Platinum to get a random color that they could use for customization. Players reacted negatively to this, as some found it would take a large amount of Platinum to get the color they wanted. Digital Extremes removed this random factor and instead added means to purchase such customization options directly.

The studio had found it important to release new content regularly to keep a stream of income from the game. They were also faced with the problem that understanding all of Warframe's systems required some commitment by the player, and players that felt it was too much would wash out after a few hours.

In 2014, Digital Extremes was acquired by the Chinese investment company Leyou. Leyou since provides necessary funding for Digital Extremes to grow, but has little influence on the direction that the developers take Warframe.

The developers are intending to keep the game forever in a beta state.

=== Switch, ninth generation consoles, and cross-platform play ===
A Nintendo Switch version was announced in July 2018 and was ported by Panic Button, and was released on November 20, 2018. The various versions of Warframe currently support full cross-platform play across several devices, with options to link their accounts to other consoles. In honor of the Nintendo Switch version, Nintendo added the character Lotus and her enhanced form Natah into Super Smash Bros. Ultimate as a spirit; the addition was considered to be bizarre as Digital Extremes had next to no ties to Nintendo and Warframe lies outside of Masahiro Sakurai's repertoire of game references.

As of December 2020, Leyou has been bought by Chinese company Tencent for a $1.5 billion deal, which also has stakes in Epic Games, Activision Blizzard and Ubisoft. Within the community of Warframe, voices of concern were outed by the acquisition and the possible meddling of Tencent in the continuation of the game. Digital Extremes published a statement explaining about the deal and the consequences and reassuring that the new ownership will not impact the game whatsoever.

Digital Extremes announced that they will bring Warframe to the PlayStation 5 and Xbox Series X and Series S upon their release in 2020. A port developed by Blind Squirrel Games for iOS was announced on February 15, 2024, with it being released 5 days later on February 20 the same year. A port to Android devices was announced in late December 2024, with its closed beta released on November 28, 2025.The port itself was released on February 11th, 2026 for Canadian players; and was released on February 18th, 2026 for the rest of the world.

== Expansions ==
Since its release, Digital Extremes has supported Warframe with patches and expanded the game through major updates. These updates have included major gameplay overhauls, such as its "Melee 2.0" combat system to give players a wider array of combat moves, additional planets and missions, story elements, limited-time and seasonal events, and new gameplay modes, alongside regular addition of new Warframes, weapons, and other equipment to procure.

=== The Second Dream ===
In December 2015, Digital Extremes released Warframe's first cinematic story quest, "The Second Dream". This quest features prominent characters from the game and introduces a new faction, the dreaded Sentients. Also, and most importantly, The Second Dream serves as an "Awakening" to Tenno's true nature, as more than a mere Warframe, "more than human, but once a child, like any other". Completion of this quest grants access to a new game mechanic named Focus and allows the player to enter the battlefield as themselves, temporarily, through Transcendence. During Transcendence, the Warframe is temporarily deactivated, and a spectral form of the Tenno enters the battlefield, channeling one of five Focus Abilities, depending on which of the five Focus Schools the player chose during the quest's events.

=== The War Within ===
In November 2016, Warframe's second cinematic quest was released, titled "The War Within". This quest sends the player on the chase for Teshin, the master and overseer of the Conclave, as he is seen suspiciously searching the pods of the newly awakened Tenno. Tracking Teshin across the Origin System leads to the discovery of the Kuva Fortress, a massive asteroid under Grineer control where the (so far only known as a legend) Twin Grineer Queens reside. The Queens are shown to have their origins as far back as the old Orokin Empire, and Teshin is revealed to be a Dax Soldier, meaning he was under their command due to them being of Orokin origin thus gaining the ability to wield the Kuva Scepter. The Queens cause an overload on the connection between Tenno and Warframe, forcing the Tenno to seek them out themselves, slowly discovering their Void powers. On the mission's climax, the Tenno unlocks Transference (which replaces Transcendence), an ability that allows them to roam independently of their Warframe at will, weakens the Elder Grineer Queen, and has the option to kill her or "Let her rot", since all Grineer bodies decay over time due to excessive cloning. This quest also introduces a moral alignment system to the game, with possible options being Sun, Neutral, and Moon. This alignment has so far not had any consequence in gameplay, leaving its purpose unknown.

=== Plains of Eidolon ===
An update to the game in November 2017, titled "Plains of Eidolon", added an open-world area to the game. The Plains is a semi-open world, initially accessible through a "hub" named Cetus, a settlement on Earth where people named the Ostrons reside, then directly through the player's ship. As the game describes them, the Ostrons are "A tight-knit band of hucksters and merchants." This expansion added Warframe's first open-world experience to the game, the ability for the player to gain reputation with the Ostrons, side-activities of fishing and mining, a Bounty system, consisting of five missions of ascending difficulty, where the player can choose to play any mission they would like regardless of whether the previous ones have been completed, a new quest named Saya's Vigil which rewarded the blueprint for the Warframe Gara, more customization options for the Tenno's combat pets, Kubrows (dogs) and Kavats (cats/ocelots), and the ability for the Tenno themselves to wield their modular weapon, called an Amplifier (or Amp, for short) as well as another modular blade called a "Zaw". Finally, the "Plains of Eidolon" offer a new series of boss fights to the game: the titular Eidolons. These Sentient-origin titans require extreme gear and in most cases teamwork to take down for unique rewards.

=== The Sacrifice ===
An update to the game in June 2018, titled "The Sacrifice", added the third cinematic story to the game. Following on the events of Warframe's previous cinematic story quests, The Second Dream and The War Within, The Sacrifice sends the Tenno on a hunt across the Origin System for a rogue Warframe known as Excalibur Umbra. This quest provides insight into Umbra's past, the ability to gain Umbra into the arsenal after the quest's climactic point, and information on the origins of the Warframes themselves, answering multiple questions, but creating even more. The Sacrifice also features the alignment system introduced in "The War Within".

=== Fortuna ===
The expansion "Fortuna" was released on PC on November 8, 2018. The update focuses on the titular Fortuna Solaris Debt Internment Colony, which serves as a hub for the game's second open-world map, Orb Vallis. The people of Fortuna (known as the Solaris) were enslaved by a Corpus known as Nef Anyo who uses ancient Orokin devices that made gallons of coolant for the workstation and trade center on Venus. The area expands upon concepts introduced in Plains of Eidolon, along with new activities, and the ability to obtain a hoverboard-styled vehicle known as a K-Drive. This update also adds more modular items such as a plasma pistol called a "Kitgun", and a robotic companion called a "MOA".

=== Empyrean ===
The "Empyrean" update was revealed during TennoCon 2018 in July of that year and released on December 12, 2019. The update allowed players to construct a Railjack, an upgradeable spacecraft inspired by FTL: Faster Than Light. Players will be able to gain non-playable characters to populate the ship, customize the ship, and add upgrades. The Railjack can be used in larger space-based missions, including space battles with enemy forces. Additionally, the game was planned to gain a system similar to the Nemesis system in Middle-earth: Shadow of Mordor, and feature boss characters that the player would fight multiple times, with the boss changing its armaments and tactics based on the past fights with the player. Empyrean update was released in 3 phases, with the first phase released on the PC build of the game on December 12, 2019.

=== The Old Blood ===
Warframe's planned nemesis system was launched on October 31, 2019, as the second phase of Empyrean, with the Nintendo Switch launch delayed to November 19, 2019. This update revealed the nemesis as a "Kuva Lich" - A once-ordinary Grineer grunt, turned super-soldier through infusion with a mystical resource named Kuva. This enemy establishes their influence over planets in the Origin System, builds a following of "Thralls" which can be defeated to reveal hints on how to defeat the Lich permanently, steals resources from the player if they finish a mission in Lich territory, and has unique personalities, weapons, appearances, and semi-randomly generated names and weaknesses, resistances, and immunities to different types of damage. A Lich can be generated in missions against the Grineer faction by performing an execution on a special enemy named a "Kuva Larvling". Said executions are performed with a newly introduced special weapon named the Parazon - a small blade attached to a rope equipped on the Warframe's wrist. The Parazon is also used to execute Thralls and specific enemies, for the game's Hacking minigame, and visually in some cutscenes. The Old Blood also introduced Grendel, the game's 42nd Warframe, together with his signature weapon. Two earlier Warframes, named Vauban and Ember, were adjusted to better function in the game's current state. Additionally, the game's "Melee 3.0" system had its release completed.

=== Warframe Revised ===
Warframe Revised, a major quality-of-life update, was released on 20 May 2020. While it didn't add any new content, it served to improve existing gameplay by modifying key aspects of gameplay, such as revising the Kuva Lich system by improving progression speed and allowing players to preview the weapon their Lich would spawn with, allowing them to make a more informed choice as to whether or not to create a Lich, in addition to fixing a significant portion of bugs and issues associated with Railjack gameplay. Player health would also be modified so that players would not suffer increased vulnerability to certain damage types and would have a brief moment of invincibility when their shields were depleted. One major aspect of the update was the removal of Warframe's controversial explosive self-damage system, replaced by a temporary stagger mechanic based on how close the player is to their explosions. Self-damage was infamous for its tendency to instantly kill players without warning since it was based on the damage of the player's weaponry, which in almost all cases was extremely high, a problem that only intensified when combined with the cramped nature of the game's procedurally generated tilesets.

=== Heart of Deimos ===
Warframe's third open-world update was announced via the game's official YouTube channel on July 20, 2020, and was released on August 25, 2020, for PC, PS4, and Xbox One, and on August 27, 2020, for Nintendo Switch. It is the game's first expansion to receive a simultaneous release across multiple platforms. The update adds Deimos, one of the two moons of Mars, as a new playable location within the game's Solar System. Deimos includes the Cambion Drift, an Infested open-world area that is smaller on the surface than the other two open-world areas but features procedurally generated underground tunnels. Much like the "Fortuna" and "Plains of Eidolon" updates, Deimos also contains a social hub called the Necralisk that houses the Entrati, an Orokin-era family known for creating the first technologies that could harness the power of the Void. Alongside Deimos came the introduction of the Helminth system, which adds the functionality for players to "infuse" new abilities on Warframes, including abilities from other Warframes. Additionally, the Heart of Deimos introduced Necramechs to the game, which are mech suits built and controlled by the player that feature their unique abilities. Lastly, this expansion brought some improvements to the game's new player experience, mainly consisting of a reworked tutorial that includes a new cinematic intro film directed by Dan Trachtenberg, which first premiered at TennoCon 2019. The film was produced by Digic Pictures using a combination of motion capture and CGI.

=== Deimos Arcana ===
Warframe's Deimos expansion was released on November 19, 2020, for PC. It adds new weapons and a new Necramech "Bonewidow". It was also planned to release with Lavos, an alchemist Warframe but was delayed due to the COVID-19 pandemic. It also added numerous quality-of-life changes and new setting options.

Warframe's second Deimos expansion was released on December 18, 2020, for PC, then was released on January 21, 2021, for Console. This was a one-month event following the Tenno's victory and the Sentients' defeat in Operation: Scarlet Spear, Erra, and the Sentients have retreated and gone into hiding. The second Sentient invasion in the Origin System thus begins, and the Orphix Sentient Units return. This time, they have been taught to override Warframes by deploying weaponized pulses cleverly designed to disable them, leaving the Necramechs as Tenno's last option.

During the Operation, Natah transmits messages to the Tenno, revealing that she was the one who taught the Orphix to disable Warframes. Her messages about deploying the Orphix series, containing a letter followed by a number, reveal a code from ordering the numbers, which says: " I AM DYING".

Father in the Necralisk on Deimos will have a shop where players can spend their earned Phasic Cells, including a brand-new Warframe, his helmet, and his weapon, new Necramech mods and cosmetics, and items.

=== Corpus Proxima ===
The Corpus Proxima expansion was released on March 19, 2021. It aimed to simplify the Railjack component of the game by making it easier to acquire a ship with fewer components, eliminating the need to have a Clan Dojo, and the ability to buy a complete Railjack from the game's stores. It also included additional Railjack missions through additional sectors/planets. Players could also recruit crewmates for their Railjacks to man the ship's guns or maintain the ship while the player is away, as well as train them for specific tasks and give them their weapons. Three new Proxima regions were added to the Railjack system: Neptune, Pluto, and Venus Proxima.

=== Sisters of Parvos ===
The Sisters of Parvos expansion was released on July 6, 2021, introducing the eponymous Sisters of Parvos, the Corpus equivalent to the Grineer Kuva Liches, who function in a similar way to them. The Sisters of Parvos are members of Parvos Granum's board of directors, given unusual powers of immortality that must be broken in the same way as a Kuva Lich. The Sisters are armed with upgraded versions of standard Corpus weapons and are accompanied by a robotic Hound which serves as the equivalent of Kuva Thralls. The expansion also introduced some changes to the way the player combats their Lich or Sister, with the enemy fleeing to one of the Proxima regions upon their "Requiem" sequence being completed, requiring the player to take them on in a short Railjack sequence before boarding their ship for the final confrontation. The Expansion also introduced the 47th Warframe Yareli, which has an aquatic theme, as well as special "Galvanised" mods for ranged weapons due to player complaints that they weren't performing as well as their melee counterparts in high-level content.

=== The New War ===
The New War expansion was released on December 15, 2021. The New War quest follows after The Sacrifice and Prelude to The New War. Ballas, along with Hunhow's son Erra wage war against the entire Origin System, prompting former enemies to become allies against a heavy threat, but all is lost after the Sentients successfully manage to take down the alliance. A new empire is born, named Narmer, and its influence becomes consequential. Ordis, now with an ally known as the Drifter, must find the Operator and end Ballas for good. This quest will open more questions regarding the philosophy of time, as well as answer the reason why the Operator owes the 'Man in the Wall'. Completion of some previous quests, is required to play The New War. Previously, the accquisition of a Railjack and a Necramech were required, but as of Update 39.0, they are no longer required.

=== Angels of the Zariman ===
The Angels of the Zariman expansion was released on April 27, 2022. Adding to the ongoing theme of temporal paradoxes, the Zariman returns to the Origin System. The ship, which was previously thought to be destroyed, is now haunted by spectral Void entities, including "Angels", towering, humanoid Void abominations. This update also overhauls several basic enemy classes, notably Eximus enemies, making them much more resistant to damage and overall more dangerous, and deeply changes the Focus system and Operator gameplay to integrate them more with general Warframe gameplay. The Tenno are tasked by the resurrected crew of the Zariman to protect the ship from being overrun by Void entities and external invaders (Corpus and Grineer troops) while helping them piece together their memories of the destruction of the original Zariman ship. This update also introduced the 49th Warframe Gyre, as well as a unique class of transforming weapons known as "Incarnon" weapons, alongside unique "Voidshell" cosmetic skins for Warframes, allowing players to pick out different materials for an added layer of customization.

=== Veilbreaker ===
The Veilbreaker expansion was released on September 7, 2022. The development features the return of Grineer soldier Kahl-175, previously playable during the New War quest. After freeing himself from Narmer's control, Kahl, with the help of Daughter Entrati and the Tenno, has emerged as the Origin System's newest hero, intending to 'break Narmer' by freeing its captives, disrupting their operations and destroying their armies. Kahl is playable during weekly "Break Narmer" missions and features a more traditional cover shooter style of gameplay, in contrast to the fast movement and parkour of the Tenno. The expansion also introduces Kahl's Garrison, a camp on Earth founded by Kahl as both a base of operations and a settlement for any captives freed during Kahl's missions. Here, the player can customize Kahl with various colors, materials, and armor pieces, as well as purchase items in exchange for Stock, a trading currency collected from completing challenges during "Break Narmer" missions. Veilbreaker also introduces Archon Hunts, challenging missions where players must hunt down and defeat the Archons, monstrous Sentient-Warframe hybrids created during the Old War, previously fought as bosses during the New War quest. Veilbreaker also made several quality-of-life changes to certain game functions, introduced the 50th Warframe, the Spartan-inspired Styanax, and distributed him for free for a limited time between 7 and 21 September to celebrate this milestone.

=== The Duviri Paradox ===
The Duviri Paradox expansion was released on April 26, 2023. It details the origins of the Drifter—a temporally paradoxical, adult version of the Tenno/Operator—who first appeared during The New War. This update introduced a new landscape, Duviri, as well as three gamemodes for it. Duviri features roguelike gameplay, with players having to pick a Warframe and Weapons from a set of randomized choices, as well as Decrees' upgrades limited to the playthrough they were collected in, with permanent upgrades available after long-term gameplay. In Duviri, the player is mostly restricted to using the Drifter, with Warframes being available with certain upgrades as well as in a location called the Undercroft. The Drifter's gameplay is similar to that of The New War, with the added ability to summon a Kaithe, a horse-like creature, and a guiding hand to reveal nearby objectives, as well as use one of six melee weapons. The player is granted the opportunity to play out the tale of one of the five royal courtiers of the kingdom of Duviri, and complete six main objectives as the courtier slowly loses control over their respective emotion. After completing these, the courtier and their uncontrolled emotions turn into a dragon, which the player must defeat and pacify. The main gamemode, 'The Duviri Experience', allows the player to play through the tale as well as complete side-objectives, while the gamemode 'The Lone Story' excludes these side-objectives, allowing the player to focus on the story. The third gamemode, 'The Circuit', has the player fight as the Warframe against waves of enemies in the Undercroft, in exchange for unique rewards such as Warframe parts or Incarnon upgrades for existing weapons. Duviri also features lost fragments telling of Duviri's background lore, as well as a vendor, Acrithis, who sells Origin System resources and upgrades, decorations, and more in exchange for resources found throughout the landscape. Duviri's appearance, behavior, and its featured tale and courtier cycles every two hours in the order of Joy, Anger, Envy, Sorrow, and Fear.

=== Whispers in the Walls ===
The Whispers in the Walls expansion was released on December 12, 2023. It explores the escalating threat of a mysterious cosmic entity called the Man in the Wall, and the methods Orokin scientist Albrecht Entrati has taken in order to subdue it. The update added a new enemy faction to the game, The Murmur, along with a boss within that faction named 'The Fragmented One'. The update also added multiple new gamemodes, Alchemy, where players use pickups from defeated enemies to fuel a crucible and Netracells, a gamemode with much higher enemy levels where players are tasked with killing enemies within a small zone. These mission types both reward players with many new modifications for their melee weapons. With the update's release, cross-platform save began to rollout to different groups of players in waves, with it being fully available to all players as of January 17, 2024.

=== Jade Shadows ===
The Jade Shadows expansion was released in June 2024 with another cinematic quest, focusing on the Stalker, an "Assassin" enemy that had served as a secondary antagonist to the Tenno and as Hunhow's enforcer. This update would heavily simplify the damage system. Instead of all enemy units possessing unique resistances and vulnerabilities separate from their overall faction, all units in a faction will share the same weaknesses. Enemy armor values were also modified, as prior to the update, enemy armor could negate a majority of incoming damage, which necessitated a focus on completely removing the enemy's armor (otherwise known as "armor stripping"). After the update, enemy armor had a hard cap of 90% damage resistance and would not increase in Steel Path missions, allowing partial armor-stripping (removing only a portion of enemy armor) to be more effective. Some status effects would also be altered as to increase their overall effectiveness.

=== The Lotus Eaters ===
The Lotus Eaters expansion was released in August, 2024, and is primarily a prologue to 1999.

=== Koumei & The Five Fates ===
Koumei & The Five Fates was an update released on October 2, 2024. It had a Japanese theme and included a new luck-themed Warframe, Koumei, along with quality of life improvements.

=== 1999 ===
The 1999 expansion, also titled 'Warframe: 1999', was released on December 13, 2024. It is centered around an alternate history 1999 and the Protoframes - individuals that are precursors to certain present-day Warframes. Players initially take the role of Arthur Nightingale, the Protoframe of Excalibur, during the events of New Year's Eve 1999 in Höllvania, a city under threat of a virus outbreak and paramilitary occupation. Players then take control of the Drifter as they team up with The Hex, a group of Protoframes led by Arthur, as they attempt to locate Albrecht Entrati in Höllvania and combat the Man in the Wall.

=== Techrot Encore ===
The Techrot Encore expansion was released on March 19, 2025. It introduces four new Protoframes, and the Technocyte Coda, the Infested counterpart to the Grineer's Kuva Lich and Corpus's Sisters of Parvos-based on members of the fictitious boy band "On-Lyne".

=== The Old Peace ===
The Old Peace expansion was released on December 10, 2025, adding a new cinematic quest, where players explore the Tenno's long-forgotten memories of the distant Tau system as both a student of the Tauron Academy and a child soldier of the Old War. The update introduces a new devil-themed Warframe, Uriel, three new Protoframes, an expanded Focus school system, the Honoria cosmetic title system, and remastered Operator and Drifter models. Two new gamemodes were introduced: Descendia, where players descend a tower fighting against numerous enemies and uncovering the memories of Roathe, the Orokin Protoframe of Uriel, and 'The Perita Rebellion', where players relive the Tenno's memories of the battlefield in the Old War and complete objectives in a given time limit until they are forced to fight one of three bosses, the Hunhullus, a giant Sentient mecha, the Dactolyst, a Sentient lost to the hivemind, or the 'Prime Vanguard', stolen Warframes commandeered by the separatist Anarchs faction.

=== The Shadowgrapher ===
The Shadowgrapher was released on March 25, 2026. The update added Follie, a new painter/ink themed Warframe, along with a new gamemode, Follie's Hunt. The gamemode sees players enter the wreckage of Vesper Relay, a colossal Tenno architecture destroyed by the Grineer faction during the Operation: Eyes of Blight event in 2014, and collect paint to complete three canvases while being chased by hostile clones of Follie.

=== Jade Shadows: Constellations ===
The Jade Shadows: Constellations expansion was released on June 17, 2026, introducing a new cinematic quest serving as the sequel to the Jade Shadows expansion from 2024. It explores the complexities of fatherhood and utilizes the concept of eternalism, as Stalker's child, who appears as two adult Warframes from two separate distant futures each named Sirius and Orion, enters the current timeline in search of Stalker. They are joined by warrior mentors Ryoku and Vena. Sirius and Orion are added to the game together as simultaneously playable constellation themed Warframes, and Ryoku and Vena are added as the latest Protoframes for Ash and Garuda, respectively. New content for the Railjack mode and a retouch for the Nidus Warframe are also introduced alongside the update.

=== Iceblade of Narin ===
The Iceblade of Narin expansion was released on September 23, 2026. It introduces a Korean themed ice based Warframe, Narin. She is the first ice Warframe in 13 years since the release of Frost.

An October update to the "Iceblade of Narin" expansion added the new game mode "Icebind" featuring six player missions. To play the new game mode, players must spend a new item called "Cryobell"; players receive three Cryobells weekly. Players use their Cryobells to select and vote on missions with randomized modifiers and side-objectives. Once players complete the mission, they are rewarded with Kuva; additional rewards can be gained when completing side objectives.

=== Tau ===
The Tau expansion is an upcoming expansion set to release in December of 2026. It is set to introduce a new cinematic quest, exploring the Tau planetary system.

== Reception ==
Reception

Aggregate score
Aggregator	Score				
Aggregator	NS	PC	PS4	PS5	Xbox One
Metacritic	86/100	69/100	64/100	85/100	62/100

Review scores
Publication	Score				
Publication	NS	PC	PS4	PS5	Xbox One
Destructoid	N/A	N/A	N/A	N/A	6/10
Edge	N/A	N/A	5/10	N/A	N/A
Eurogamer	N/A	N/A	4/10	N/A	N/A
Game Informer	N/A	N/A	7.75/10	N/A	N/A
GameRevolution	N/A	N/A	3.5/5	N/A	N/A
GameSpot	N/A	6/10	N/A	N/A	N/A
GameTrailers	N/A	N/A	6/10	N/A	N/A
GameZone	N/A	N/A	8.5/10	N/A	N/A
IGN	8.6/10	7/10	7.5/10	N/A	N/A
PlayStation Official Magazine – UK	N/A	N/A	7/10	N/A	N/A
Official Xbox Magazine (UK)	N/A	N/A	N/A	N/A	7/10
PC Gamer (UK)	N/A	86%	N/A	N/A	N/A
Polygon	N/A	N/A	5/10	N/A	N/A

On release, Warframe received "mixed or average reviews" on the PlayStation 4, Xbox One, and PC, while the Nintendo Switch and PlayStation 5 versions received "generally favorable reviews", according to the review aggregation website Metacritic. GameZone's Mike Splechta said of the PlayStation 4 version, "If you already enjoy games like Monster Hunter which require you to farm for items to craft better ones, Warframe follows that very same formula, except with much more satisfying and faster-paced combat." However, as of 2018 PC Gamer said that "Warframe's growth doesn't resemble a well-tended plant—it's more like a mutant science experiment. Game systems are haphazardly stitched onto one other in ways that are sometimes incoherent, but oddly charming all the same."

The game is one of the most-played games available on Steam. Digital Extremes attributes the success of the title by being a F2P game. Digital Extremes describes the game as a "rogue success", as the game can secure and sustain a large number of players without gaining significant attention from other people. More than 26 million players had played the game since launch by April 2016, and by March 2018, five years from its open beta, had reached 38 million players. The game had nearly 50 million players by the time of its sixth anniversary. In July 2016, Digital Extremes launched its first Warframe-dedicated convention, "TennoCon", in London, Ontario, drawing 1000 players, where they announced news of upcoming features and updates to the game. Digital Extremes have been running the event annually ever since.

The game was nominated for "Best Ongoing Game" at The Game Awards 2017, and won the People's Voice Award for "Action" at the 2018 Webby Awards. It was also nominated for the "Still Playing Award" at the 2018 Golden Joystick Awards, and for "Fan Favorite Shooter Game" and "Fan Favorite Fall Release" with Fortuna at the Gamers' Choice Awards. At the 2019 Webby Awards, the game again won the Peoples Voice Awards for "Action Game" and "Best Sound Design". It was nominated for "Best Game Expansion" with Empyrean and for the "Still Playing" award at the 2019 Golden Joystick Awards.

Warframe received back-to-back nominations for the "Still Playing Award - PC & Console" at the Golden Joystick Awards in 2025 and in 2026. The game also received a nomination for "Best Community Support" at the Game Awards 2026.
