= Digital Extremes =

Canadian video game developer

Digital Extremes Ltd.
- Type: Subsidiary
- Industry: Video games
- Founded: 1993; 33 years ago
- Headquarters: London, Ontario, Canada
- Number of employees: 450+ (2025)
- Parent: Tencent
- Divisions: Digital Extremes Toronto
- Website: digitalextremes.com

Digital Extremes Ltd. is a Canadian video game developer founded in 1993 by James Schmalz. They are best known for their live service flagships Warframe and Soulframe, two free-to-play cooperative online action games developed in tandem; and for co-creating Epic Games' Unreal series of games.

Digital Extremes is headquartered in London, Ontario. In 2014, 61% of the company was sold to Chinese holding company Multi Dynamic, now Leyou, for $73 million. In May 2016 Leyou exercised a call option and increased its stake to 97% of Digital Extremes for a total consideration of $138.2 million US. In December 2020, Tencent bought Leyou for 1.3 billion dollars, which included the majority stake in Digital Extremes that Leyou held.

== History ==
Founder James Schmalz created Epic Pinball, published by then shareware publisher Epic MegaGames. Bolstered from the success of Epic Pinball and the rising technology movement in the mid-1990s toward realistic 3D graphics, Schmalz founded Digital Extremes in 1993 and the company began co-development with Epic on what would become Epic's Unreal franchise.

Unreal is a first-person shooter, released in 1998, and was followed up with Unreal Tournament in 1999, which received numerous industry awards. Subsequent sequels in the Unreal franchise include Unreal Championship, Unreal Tournament 2003, and Unreal Tournament 2004. The Unreal series has sold more than 15 million units worldwide across Windows, Mac, PlayStation 2, Dreamcast, Xbox, PlayStation 3, Xbox 360, and other platforms.

According to Scott Miller, the co-founder of the video game company 3D Realms, Digital Extremes was willing to take over development of its much-delayed game Duke Nukem Forever in 2004, but the proposal was rejected by others at 3D Realms, which Miller described as a "fatal suicide shot" for the project.

Digital Extremes released the original third-person shooter, Dark Sector, in 2008 for PlayStation 3, Xbox 360, and Windows. It uses the proprietary Evolution Engine.

Digital Extremes worked with 2K to develop the comic-book franchise video game sequel, The Darkness II, which met with positive reviews. Digital Extremes developed the PlayStation 3 version of BioShock, as well as developed the multiplayer component of the sequel, BioShock 2, while simultaneously developing the multiplayer portion of THQ's first-person shooter Homefront.

Digital Extremes developed the game for the 2013 Star Trek Into Darkness film, working with Bandai Namco and Paramount to develop Star Trek, which was poorly received.

In October 2014, Sumpo Food Holdings Ltd. acquired a majority share of Digital Extremes, with Perfect World Co. acquiring minority shares. Sumpo was rebranded as Leyou in 2015, and by June 2016, had purchased the remaining shares in Digital Extremes.

In 2016, it was revealed that Digital Extremes' game Warframe had been hacked, exposing the email addresses of more than 700,000 players.

Digital Extremes opened a development studio in Toronto, Canada, and began operations in January 2018.

In December 2020, Leyou was acquired by Tencent, which included Digital Extremes. The developer stated that this would not change how they operate as they remained independent of Tencent, though through Tencent they would be able to provide better support for the Chinese version of the Warframe client.

In July 2022, Digital Extremes publicly revealed its latest free-to-play cooperative online action game, Soulframe, via a cinematic trailer at TennoCon, Digital Extremes' annual fan convention.

In October 2023, James Schmalz stepped down as CEO, with former Warframe director Steve Sinclair promoted to CEO. Community manager Rebecca Ford became the game's new director. In the following month, Digital Extremes reportedly laid off about 30 employees, mostly from its external projects division. While the layoffs were confirmed, the company would not state how many people were affected. It also terminated its partnership with Airship Syndicate, returning Wayfinder to its control.

== Technology ==
The Evolution Engine logo

Evolution is Digital Extremes' proprietary game engine. The engine made its debut with Dark Sector, and was again utilized in The Darkness II; 2013's Star Trek also featured use of the Evolution engine.

The engine is currently in use in the free-to-play live service titles Warframe and Soulframe Preludes.

== Live events ==
The Digital Extremes team presents Soulframe during a TennoCon Main Stage Panel.

Since July 8th, 2017, Digital Extremes has hosted an annual hybrid in-person and digital gaming convention named TennoCon. The convention centres primarily around celebrating the community, music, and future content of Warframe; and beginning with its initial reveal at TennoCon 2022, each TennoCon features an increasing amount of content related to Soulframe, Digital Extremes' second live service flagship free-to-play game.

TennoCon is hosted in London, Ontario, where Digital Extremes is headquartered. It comprises a series of panels across multiple days, where the developers discuss their craft; alongside numerous activities, giveaways, and community gatherings. The primary panel is the annual closing ceremony, TennoLive, where the creative leads of Warframe and Soulframe showcase upcoming major updates for each game.

Digital Extremes also holds multiple world tour social events each year, known as TennoVIP. Whilst smaller events than TennoCon, each TennoVIP gives players an opportunity to meet members of the Digital Extremes Community team and experience certain exclusive reveals. Occasionally, one of Digital Extremes' regular Devstreams will be broadcast in front of a live TennoVIP audience.

== Awards and recognition ==
In March 2018, Noclip published the video documentary on the making of Warframe. The two-part feature tells the story of how Warframe succeeded as an independently developed and published game that changed the course of Digital Extremes.

Digital Extremes' employment environment has been recognized as one of Canada's Top Employers for 2010, 2011, 2012 and through to 2018. Additionally, the company has been recognized as one of Canada's top employers for Young People. In 2010 and 2011, the Financial Post named Digital Extremes one of the 10 best companies to work for in Canada.

On the provincial level, Digital Extremes received the Ontario Small Business Award in 2010. Digital Extremes was also presented with the Large Business of the Year award in 2011 from the London Chamber of Commerce. Digital Extremes was also awarded the Excellence in Human Resources award from The London Chamber of Commerce in early 2012. Also, in 2025, Digital Extremes was awarded the Corporate Icon Award from London Chamber of Commerce.

== Games developed ==
Digital Extremes started development of Warframe, a free-to-play title, in 2000. Digital Extremes launched Warframe on PC in March 2013, PlayStation 4 in November, and on Xbox One in September 2014. The company released Warframe on Nintendo Switch in November 2018, PlayStation 5 in November 2020, Xbox Series X/S in April 2021, iOS in February 2024, Android in Canada on February 11, 2026 followed by a global release on February 18, 2026, and Nintendo Switch 2 on March 25, 2026. Digital Extremes continues to refresh this games-as-a-service title on a regular basis with updates including "Plains of Eidolon" (October 2017), "The Sacrifice" (June 2018), "Fortuna" (November 2018), the Nightwave series (February 2019), "The Jovian Concord" (May 2019), "Empyrean" (Christmas 2019), "Heart of Deimos" (August 2020), "The New War" (December 2021), "Angels of the Zariman" (April 2022), "The Duviri Paradox" (April 2023), "Warframe 1999" (December 2024) and "The Old Peace" (December 2025).

Digital Extremes worked with developer n-Space to develop the fantasy role-playing video game, Sword Coast Legends, set within the Dungeons & Dragons franchise.

Digital Extremes developed The Amazing Eternals, a team-based multiplayer online first-person shooter video game. The game was announced and entered closed alpha on May 23, 2017, under the development codename "Keystone". Closed beta began three months later on August 29. By October, development was "paused", according to a forum post by a staff member. The cancellation of the project and Digital Extremes' decision to refocus on its more successful title Warframe was later attributed in part the commercial failure of LawBreakers and the lack of interest in The Amazing Eternals closed beta.

The team worked with Madison, Wisconsin-based developer Human Head Studios to publish Survived By, a free-to-play bullet-hell MMO with crafting and role-playing elements. Survived By was shut down as of April 2019.

During TennoCon 2022, Digital Extremes announced Soulframe, a fantasy MMORPG currently playable via a pre-alpha version titled Soulframe Preludes. It also said that it would be publishing a massively multiplayer online game from Airship Syndicate, Wayfinder, but after Wayfinder's release in August 2023, Digital Extremes cut its external games division, leaving Wayfinder under Airship Syndicate's control.

On November 25, 2025, Digital Extremes launched the Founders program for Soulframe. The Founders program is expected to continue until later in 2026, and will also be available at the time of the game's release on consoles.

Year	Title	Platform(s)
1993	Solar Winds	MS-DOS
1993	Epic Pinball	MS-DOS
1993	Silverball	MS-DOS
1995	Extreme Pinball	MS-DOS, PlayStation
1998	Unreal	Windows, Mac OS
1999	Unreal Tournament	Windows, Mac OS, Linux, PlayStation 2, Dreamcast
2001	Adventure Pinball: Forgotten Island	Windows
2002	Unreal Championship	Xbox
2002	Unreal Tournament 2003	Windows, Mac OS, Linux
2004	Unreal Tournament 2004	Windows, Mac OS, Linux
2005	Pariah	Windows, Xbox
2006	Warpath	Windows, Xbox
2008	Dark Sector	Windows, Xbox 360, PlayStation 3
2008	BioShock (PS3 port)	PlayStation 3
2010	BioShock 2 (multiplayer)	Windows, Mac OS, Xbox 360, PlayStation 3
2011	Homefront (multiplayer)	Windows, Xbox 360, PlayStation 3
2012	The Darkness II	Windows, Mac OS, Xbox 360, PlayStation 3
2013	Warframe	Windows, Xbox One, Xbox Series X/S, PlayStation 4, PlayStation 5, Nintendo Switch, Nintendo Switch 2, iOS, Android
2013	Star Trek	Windows, Xbox 360, PlayStation 3
2015	Sword Coast Legends	Windows, Mac OS, Linux, Xbox One, PlayStation 4
Canceled	The Amazing Eternals	Windows
2018	Survived By (published)	Windows
TBD	Soulframe	Windows
