= The Darkness II =

2012 first-person shooter game

- Cover art featuring protagonist Jackie Estacado
- Developer: Digital Extremes
- Publisher: 2K
- Director: Sheldon Carter
- Producer: Dave Kudirka
- Designer: Tom Galt
- Programmers: Glen Miner; Darryl Baldock
- Artist: Mat Tremblay
- Writer: Paul Jenkins
- Composer: Tim Wynn
- Series: The Darkness
- Engine: Evolution
- Platforms: Microsoft Windows; PlayStation 3 Xbox 360; Mac OS X
- Release: NA: February 7, 2012; PAL: February 10, 2012; OS X: WW: April 18, 2012
- Genre: First-person shooter
- Modes: Single-player, multiplayer

The Darkness II is a 2012 first-person shooter video game developed by Digital Extremes and published by 2K. The game is the sequel to The Darkness (2007) and based on the comic book series published by Top Cow Productions. The player controls Jackie Estacado, a mafia hitman who possesses a mysterious power called "the Darkness" that grants him supernatural abilities and a pair of Demon Arms. The game features elements found in role-playing video games such as skill trees, experience, and a four-player cooperative mode. The player must rescue the soul of Jackie's dead girlfriend, which was trapped by the Darkness in Hell, and confront the Brotherhood, a group of armed cultists trying to take the Darkness away from Jackie.

Digital Extremes replaced the first game's developer Starbreeze Studios, though Paul Jenkins returned to write the script for the sequel. While the main narrative was envisioned to be a personal journey for Jackie, developers described the cooperative multiplayer mode as a "dark comedy". Singer Mike Patton returned to voice the Darkness, and Brian Bloom provided the voice for Jackie Estacado, replacing Kirk Acevedo. The development artists hand-painted the majority of the game's assets to create a comic book-influenced visual style.

The Darkness II was released for Windows, PlayStation 3, and Xbox 360 in February 2012. The game received positive reviews upon release, with critics praising the gameplay, story, pacing, and art style. Criticisms were directed at the game's short length, technical issues, and lack of replay value. The game debuted as the third best-selling game in its first week of release in the United Kingdom.

Additionally, the game can be purchased from the Xbox digital store and played on Xbox One and Xbox Series consoles through the Xbox backwards compatibility program.

== Gameplay ==
Players can dual wield weapons and control a pair of Demon Arms. The left arm is used to grab objects while the right arm is used to slash enemies.

Jackie can use various firearms, such as submachine guns, shotguns, and assault rifles, and has the ability to dual wield some of these weapons. Additionally, he is armed with a pair of Demon Arms, which resemble tentacles and can be used to slash enemies or pick up various items within the environment (parking meters, car doors, etc.) to use as projectile weapons or shields. The Demon Arms can rip out the heart of fallen enemies and devour them for health, pick up enemies for execution, or throw them. The player is guided by a Darkling, a goblin-like creature that assists in combat and gathers weapons and ammo. At several points, the player can directly control the Darkling, allowing them to squeeze into tight spaces that Jackie cannot enter and execute enemies from behind. When exposed to light, Jackie's health regeneration and Darkness abilities are disabled. In addition, his vision will become blurred and he will experience a ringing sound when exposed. The player can disable these sources by shooting them, causing them to malfunction.

The game features elements found in role-playing video games. Killing enemies, devouring hearts and performing executions earn the player Essence, which can be used to purchase upgrades at various talent shrines. Collecting relics, which serve as collectibles, earns a small amount of Essence. The skill tree is divided into four main aspects: Hitman, Execution, Darkness Powers, and Demon Arm. The Hitman aspect consists of passive upgrades that improve the weapon's reload time and magazine size. The Execution tree allows each execution to net more benefits, such as gaining a massive amount of health, ammo or a shield. Darkness Powers and the Demon Arms grant players access to active abilities, some of which have a brief cooldown after use. These abilities include Gun Channeling, an ability that gives the player unlimited ammo and enhanced damage for a short time; Swarm, which distracts enemies; and Black Hole, which triggers a large area of effect attack that sucks enemies into a vortex.

The game features a cooperative multiplayer campaign called "Vendettas" that runs parallel to the main campaign and allows up to four players to play together. The story involves four hitmen working for Jackie as they attempt to stop the Brotherhood from obtaining the Spear of Destiny. Each character has different Darkness powers and is armed with a unique special weapon. For instance, Inugami is a character who uses a Darkness-infused samurai sword, while Shoshanna uses a blunderbuss which can shoot without bullets. Although the mode can be played solo, the experience is significantly more difficult. There is an arcade mode called "Hit List" that allows players to replay certain Vendetta missions and complete challenges.

== Plot ==
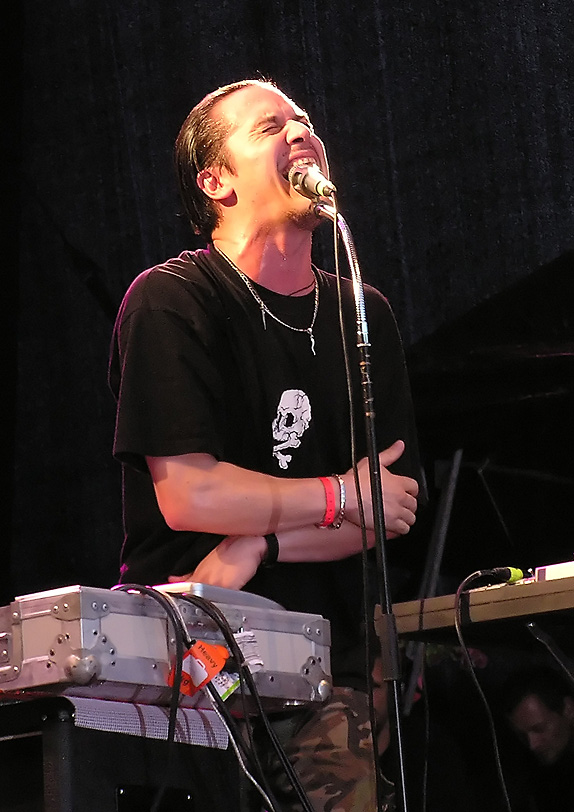
Mike Patton voices the Darkness

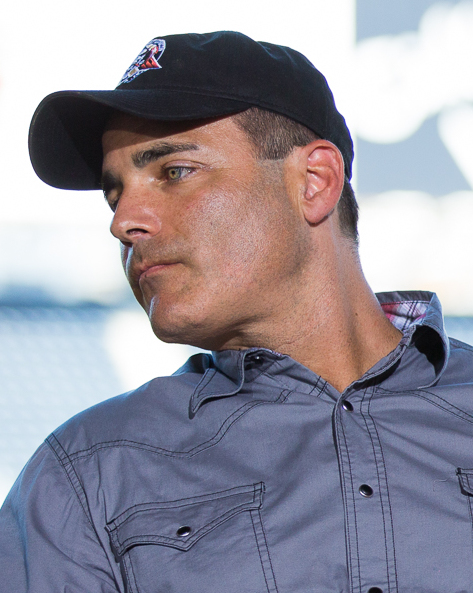
Brian Bloom voices Jackie Estacado

Jackie Estacado (Brian Bloom) has become head of the Franchetti family, and has learned to suppress the Darkness (Mike Patton), an ancient demonic force in his bloodline. Jackie is haunted by the memory of his murdered girlfriend, Jenny Romano (Stephanie Frame). Jackie and his crew are attacked in a restaurant by a rival gang. Wounded, Jackie restores his powers using the Darkness. Aided by the Darkling (Peter Newman)—a goblin-like familiar—Jackie pursues his attackers into the subway. A vision of Jenny appears, then Jackie is apparently hit by a train. Jackie seemingly awakens to find himself in a mental institution, where various members of his crew are patients and staff. Among them is estranged occultist Johnny Powell, who tells Jackie to find him.

Reawakening with his men, Jackie plans a counterattack. Jimmy the Grape (Frank Ashmore), provides a lead that points to Swifty, a crime boss. Swifty is subdued; he explains that a shady group at the Brimstone Club brothel paid him to put the hit on Jackie. The Darkness murders Swifty to silence him. Vinnie (Rick Pasqualone) enlists his contact at Brimstone to help them. At the club, Jackie encounters armed cultists of the Brotherhood, a secret society who ordered the hit and wish to use the Darkness for themselves. They ambush Jackie with blinding lights that inhibit the Darkness, and Jackie is knocked out. Waking up, he finds himself crucified and a device (the Siphon) draining his dark power. He is greeted by Victor (William Salyers) who offers to take the Darkness from him in exchange for the lives of his family. Refusing, he loses consciousness and finds himself in Hell where the Darkness keeps Jenny's soul.

Jackie breaks free but Victor threatens to murder Jackie's Aunt Sarah (Bridger Fox). As the club burns, the Darkness offers Jenny's soul in exchange for the Siphon. Jackie and his men retake the penthouse, but Jackie is shot by Bragg, a Brotherhood enforcer, who murders Sarah. Jackie awakens in a psychiatric ward where Jenny and his crew are staff and patients. They tell him that his mob stories are delusions. At Sarah's funeral, the Brotherhood launches another attack. Jackie subdues Bragg, who says Victor is based in an abandoned theme park. Victor shuts Jackie in an iron maiden; he loses consciousness. Again, he wakes in the ward, but the janitor (his Darkling) explains that the asylum is a trap to keep him away from Jenny.

Victor drains the Darkness from Jackie. The Darkling helps Jackie escape and retake a small portion of the Darkness. Jackie pursues Victor through a mansion once owned by Carlo Estacado, Jackie's father. Jackie learns from Victor that Carlo had promised the Darkness to the Brotherhood to keep Jackie free. Jackie kills Victor and impales himself with the Siphon, regaining the Darkness and killing himself to rescue Jenny from Hell. Jackie once again wakes up in the psychiatric ward where the staff offer to take him to Jenny. The Darkling sacrifices himself to help Jackie escape. Jackie is confronted by Victor, Jenny, and an orderly who attempt to convince Jackie that his life as a mob boss is a delusion.

On the roof, the player is given a choice to stay with Jenny in the ward, or reject the asylum and attempt to reach Hell. If the player chooses to stay, Jenny and Jackie slow dance, and the game ends. Otherwise, Jackie jumps from the roof and falls into Hell. The Darkness sends demons to stop Jackie, but Jackie releases Jenny from her bindings and the couple embraces. In a post-credits scene, Jenny is revealed to have become the new host for the Angelus, who has seen the destruction Jackie and the Darkness have caused. Jackie is too powerful and must remain trapped in Hell; leaving him screaming as the screen fades.

== Development ==
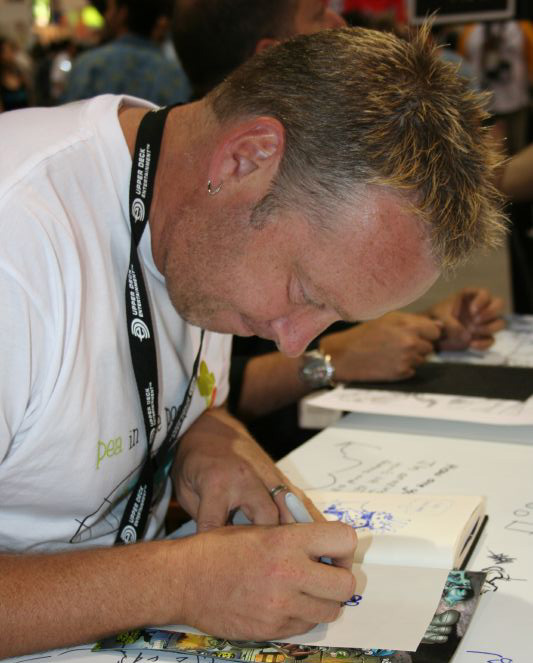
Paul Jenkins returned to write the game.

Publisher 2K Games approached Canadian developer Digital Extremes to develop The Darkness II, replacing Starbreeze Studios which worked on the first game. Digital Extremes worked on the title for three years. Paul Jenkins returning as the title's writer. According to Starbreeze's CEO Mikael Nermark, the company was not given the option of working on the sequel and was already busy working on Syndicate when The Darkness II was announced.

According to director Sheldon Carter, Digital Extremes agreed to assume development responsibilities as the team wanted to create a shooter with a large emphasis on the story. Both Jenkins and the team at Digital Extremes worked closely, with the team making adjustments to Jenkins' script to suit the gameplay. Carter called the narrative a "love story", which he felt "[balanced] the adrenaline of the action", while the first part of the game's three-act plot was about "survival" since Jackie was attacked by an opposing mob. The team spent a lot of time working on the tone of Jackie. Carter compared Jackie to Tony Soprano, a "badass" character who has to face a lot of internal struggles. The team hoped that the story could make the players sympathize with Jackie. According to designer Tom Galt, while Jackie was a mob boss on the surface, "in his heart he is human and a good-natured guy". With the game's large focus on narrative, the Darkling was given a personality and played a huge role in the story. The game does not cut to third-person so that a limited extent of control can be granted to players even in cinematics. While the game has a heavy narrative focus, all cutscenes and cinematics can be skipped for players who only want to enjoy the gameplay. One of the biggest requests from players of the first game was to have Mike Patton return to voice the Darkness. Nolan North served as a stand-in voice actor for Jackie during the game's pre-production, before Brian Bloom was chosen to voice the character.

The Darkness comic was a large inspiration for the team. The team read the comic and decided to adopt a comic book-influenced "graphic noir" art style, as they believed the comic's use of high contrast colors contributed to its success. The team used some of the assets made by Starbreeze as a reference, and created new ones using their own internal proprietary game engine named the Evolution Engine, which powered the studio's previous game Dark Sector (2008). The development artists hand-painted the majority of the game's assets, though this idea was initially met with resistance within the art team due to the huge amount of workload such an approach would create.

The team decided to make the title more action-orientated in an attempt to differentiate itself from its predecessor. The shooting mechanic was refined, and the concept of "quad-wielding", which allows players to engage in combat using both the Demon Arms and duel-wielding weapons, was introduced. Carter explained that they saw the Demon Arms as an opportunity to make the combat more "up close and personal". The team changed the game's abilities to supplement this, such as turning the ability of Black Hole into a random drop from enemies. The quad-wielding mechanic enabled the combat to have more variety, allowing players to approach the same scenario with different combat styles and encourages players to experiment with different tactics. The gameplay was designed to be violent, with some execution animations being removed for being not "extravagant" enough. To ensure the game was not too easy, the team disabled Jackie's powers when he is exposed to light and created various enemy types to challenge the player in different ways.

The game's cooperative mode Vendetta features a story that runs parallel to the game's main narrative. The team envisioned Vendetta as a dark comedy with over-the-top characters. It is tonally very different from the main game, and the team hoped that players would use the Vendetta mode to "blow off some steam" after experiencing Jackie's story in the main narrative. The team used the mode to explore other characters and elements in the universe, and Jenkins has written more than 10 pages of backstory for each of the four playable characters.

2K unveiled the game in May 2011. The game was initially set to be released in October the same year, but was delayed until February 2012. Players who pre-ordered the game would have upgraded to the Limited Edition, which included gameplay bonuses, illustration drawn by Marc Silvestri, and digital download for The Darkness Origins Volume 1 and Volume 2. 2K provided extensive marketing for the game, launching a four-week promotion program on Kerrang Radio, partnering with Forbidden Planet for window displays and in-store promotions, and placing TV advertisements on both SyFy and Horror Channel. A demo for the game was released in January 2012 on Steam, Xbox Live Arcade and PlayStation Network.

== Reception ==
Reception

Aggregate score
Aggregator	Score
Metacritic	(PC) 77/100 (PS3) 79/100 (X360) 80/100

Review scores
Publication	Score
Destructoid	7.5/10
Eurogamer	7/10
Game Informer	7/10
GameRevolution	4/5
GameSpot	7/10
GamesRadar+	4/5
IGN	8/10
Joystiq	4/5
PC Gamer (US)	80/100

The game received generally positive reviews from critics upon release, according to review aggregator Metacritic. It was the third best-selling retail game in its week of release in the UK, surpassed by Kingdoms of Amalur: Reckoning and Final Fantasy XIII-2.

The story received critical acclaim from players. Mikel Reparaz from GamesRadar described the narrative as "part mob drama, part surreal comedy, and part supernatural revenge romance", though he disliked the cliffhanger ending. While the game focuses on the relationship between Jackie and Jenny, Reparaz noted that the supporting characters were "endearing", and remarked that they were well-written and well-acted. He stated he liked the combinations of gun-play and Demon Arms gameplay, which he felt turned Jackie into "an unstoppable dynamo of horror". He also enjoyed the execution animations, which he felt were "brutal" and "never quite get old", though he felt that the gun-play became repetitive by the end of the game. Anthony Gallegos from IGN felt that the story was not as immediately interesting as the first game and noted that it reused some of its predecessors' plot devices, but remarked that some of the scenes with Jenny were "touching", which made the story more "personal" for the player. He further commented that the game's story focus enabled the title to have better pacing. Rich McCormick from PC Gamer praised the story for being "involving", and that the title "plays with concepts of unreliable narration in a way that only games allow". Conrad Zimmerman from Destructoid felt the narrative was fairly average, but the game's storytelling was "handled remarkably well". Andrew Reiner from Game Informer remarked that unlike the original game, the title is more of a fast-paced shooter than a supernatural thriller, and he felt that the story and the characters were inferior when compared to the first game. Kevin VanOrd from GameSpot praised the character development and the game's pacing. He described the story as "unusual" and "creepy", and added that the game's narrative excels when it "plays with your expectations and has you wondering".

The gameplay received a positive response from critics. Daniel Bischoff from Game Revolution called the gun-play "responsive" and the Demon Arms "fun to control". He particularly liked the combat variety and enemy types, which put the players in various combat scenarios, but was disappointed by the game's length, which lasted for only seven hours. Zimmerman agreed that the game was short, but said the title was fun throughout. Dan Whitehead from Eurogamer also praised the Demon Arms and added that it helped "opening up combat possibilities that other shooters can't hope to compete with". He further praised the developer for making the combat faster and refining the gameplay of the original. Gallegos praised the combat for being "vastly superior" to the first game and said that Jackie's overpowered nature made the game more exciting as players could focus on fun ways to kill enemies. He also liked the skill trees, which he felt have reinvigorated the combat during the later sections of the game. McCormick noted that the game's control was not too overwhelming for players despite needing to control multiple limbs at once. He was disappointed by the final levels, which he felt was a "slog" to play through. Reiner praised the game for making players feel powerful, but he felt that the game was repetitive due to the lack of combat variety and remarked that combat "relies on reflexes more than strategy". Most reviewers thought that the cooperative multiplayer mode was fun and that it provided extra gameplay for an otherwise short title, though both Ben Gilbert from Joystiq and Zimmerman thought the combat not as exciting as the main game since the playable characters in the Vendetta mode do not have Demon Arms. Whitehead noted that the mode was "basic to the point of being crude", though he felt the secondary story was "enjoyable".

The game's presentation received mixed reviews. Gilbert praised the art direction, calling it "gorgeous" and "impressive". Zimmerman liked the cel-shaded graphics, which he felt was "evocative of the comic books from which these games originate" and made the game "surprisingly easy to get sucked in". Reiner, however, felt that the new art style did not capture the eerie feeling of the original game. Gallegos noted that the reviewed copy suffered from software bugs, broken animations, glitches, and frame rate issues and felt that the game was marred by polish issues.
