= Adventure Pinball: Forgotten Island =

2001 video game

- Developer: Digital Extremes
- Publisher: Electronic Arts
- Engine: Unreal Engine 1
- Platform: Microsoft Windows
- Release: NA: March 20, 2001; EU: March 30, 2001
- Genre: Pinball
- Modes: Single-player, multiplayer

Adventure Pinball: Forgotten Island is a pinball video game released in 2001 by Electronic Arts for Microsoft Windows.

== Gameplay ==
A pinball about to be launched into play on the first level of the game, Ooga's House. A pinball multiplier can be seen to the left, which ultimately earns the player more lives.

The game uses Unreal Engine 1 which was previously only used for first-person shooter games. The game is rendered in 3-D and has both a story mode consisting of 9 levels, where no actual pinball tables exist and a table mode. Most of the levels must be unlocked by completing other levels. There are hidden areas in the story mode to earn bonus points, and they also feature power-ups to help the player progress throughout the game.

The game has three difficulty settings which adjust the number of balls that can be played.

Attempting to complete a goal in story mode involving Waterbugs, one of its unique features and differences from previous pinball games.

Rather than the standard pinball format, players are able to roam around a small world known as "The Forgotten Island". It also features creatures such as pterodactyls or a Yeti to eliminate or bypass while playing in story mode.

Story mode features unique gems to collect throughout the levels for special power-ups. A ruby gem is found here in a mushroom cave.

In addition to the instruction manual, a booklet is provided with the Windows version of the game that includes a short story in the appearance of the main character's personal journal.

== Levels ==
The levels for story mode and table mode are the same, but the difference is that story mode offers quests and objectives to unlock new levels for both story mode and table mode, as opposed to table mode which is used to set a high score for each level.

== Development ==
The game went gold on March 5, 2001.

== Reception ==
Reception

Aggregate score
Aggregator	Score
Metacritic	60/100

Review scores
Publication	Score
4Players	71%
Computer Games Strategy Plus	3.5/5
Gamekult	5/10
GameRevolution	C−
GameSpot	6.6/10
IGN	6.7/10
Jeuxvideo.com	12/20
Next Generation	2/5
PC Gamer (US)	49%
PC Zone	59%

Adventure Pinball: Forgotten Island received "mixed" reviews according to the review aggregation website Metacritic. Trey Walker of GameSpot said, "While it has its faults, it is for the most part successful in adding first-person shooter flash to a traditional kind of game." Vincent Lopez of IGN said, "It's one of the few times where I would have liked less levels, with more quality construction." However, Jeff Lundrigan of NextGen said that the game "wants to be a lot more than just a pinball game, but while it offers something beyond the usual pinball gameplay, it also just doesn't handle the basics of pinball gameplay very well."
