= Silverball =

1993 video game

- Cover art
- Developers: Digital Extremes; Epic MegaGames
- Publishers: NA: MicroLeague; EU: Team17
- Designer: James Schmalz
- Platform: MS-DOS
- Release: NA: 1993; EU: 1993
- Genre: Sports
- Mode: Single-player or 2-4 players (hotseat)

Silverball is a 1993 pinball video game developed by Digital Extremes and Epic MegaGames and published by MicroLeague. Silverball was the first set of pinball games created by James Schmalz and led to the development of Epic Pinball.

== Gameplay ==
The player can alter the angle of the table, and choose to play a three or five ball game. The game includes multiball.

== Tables ==
The shareware version included the "Fantasy" table and nonplayable versions of "Blood", "Snooker Champ", and "Odyssey" in which the plunger does not work. There are also two tables which appear in the later released Silverball Plus 2, as well a bonus table that could be ordered for free when purchasing Silverball directly from Epic MegaGames.

Table	Game edition	Notes
Fantasy	Original Silverball	Shareware Table
Blood	Original Silverball	Not playable in Shareware version.
Snooker Champ	Original Silverball	Not playable in Shareware version.
Odyssey	Original Silverball	Not playable in Shareware version.
Duel	Silverball Plus 2	Similar design as the Epic Pinball table "Magic".
Warbot	Silverball Plus 2	Similar design as the Epic Pinball table "Excalibur".
Nova	Silverball Installment	Similar music as the Epic Pinball table "Space Journey".

== Reception ==
Computer Gaming World stated that "the ball's action is a bit strange", behaving like rubber instead of steel. The magazine concluded that "Silverball ranks high for those who don't mind the unrealistic ball action".

Pelit found that "surprisingly" fewer bugs were in the shareware version, and that it was better.
