= Dark Sector =

2008 video game

- Developer: Digital Extremes
- Publishers: Xbox 360, PlayStation 3 D3 Publisher; Microsoft Windows; Aspyr; Noviy Disk
- Director: Steve Sinclair
- Producer: Sheldon Carter
- Writer: Steve Sinclair
- Composer: Keith Power
- Engine: Evolution
- Platforms: Xbox 360; PlayStation 3 Microsoft Windows
- Release: Xbox 360, PlayStation 3: NA: March 25, 2008; JP: March 27, 2008 (X360); EU: April 4, 2008; JP: July 10, 2008 (PS3); AU: October 9, 2008 (PS3 only); Microsoft Windows: RU: January 22, 2009; WW: March 23, 2009 (Steam); NA: March 24, 2009; EU: March 26, 2009; JP: May 29, 2009; AU: July 22, 2009
- Genre: Third-person shooter
- Modes: Single-player, multiplayer

Dark Sector, stylized as darkSector, is a 2008 third-person shooter video game developed by Digital Extremes for the Xbox 360, PlayStation 3 and Microsoft Windows.

The game is set in the fictional Eastern Bloc country of Lasria, and centers on protagonist Hayden Tenno (voiced by Michael Rosenbaum), a morally ambivalent CIA "clean-up man". While trying to intercept a rogue agent named Robert Mezner, Hayden's right arm is infected with the fictional Technocyte virus, which gives him the ability to grow a three-pronged "Glaive" at will.

Dark Sector received mixed reviews for its visual design, originality of action and weapon-based gameplay. Many critics have compared the game to Resident Evil 4 and Gears of War, for their similar style of play and story. Digital Extremes would revisit the setting elements and themes of Dark Sector in their later release, Warframe.

== Gameplay ==
Hayden using his Glaive to fight Lasrian soldiers

Gameplay of Dark Sector revolves around the use of the Glaive, a tri-blade throwing weapon similar to a boomerang which returns to Hayden after each throw. The Glaive can be used for long-distance combat, solving environmental puzzles, and picking up in-game items. When in close proximity to an enemy, context-sensitive actions may appear, allowing the player to execute enemies with "finishers". Enemies hold onto Hayden while attacking, and the player must rapidly press a randomly prompted button to break free.

Environmental puzzles in the game usually focus upon capturing various elements (fire, electricity, or ice) with the Glaive. For example, a web blocking Hayden's path can be bypassed by capturing fire with the Glaive, and then launching it at the web to burn it down. The Glaive can also be dual-wielded with a gun, which allows the player to perform weapon combos which are more effective against shielded enemies. As the game progresses, Hayden and the Glaive are given several new abilities; it can be guided through the air, being able to kill multiple enemies; a charged-up throw for deadlier attacks; and the ability to make Hayden invisible for a short time and provide a temporary shield.

The camera is positioned over the shoulder for third-person shooting, and the player can take cover by standing next to an object such as a pillar or wall. While in cover, Hayden can move temporarily out of cover to fire and throw the Glaive, but there is no blind firing from behind cover. There is a sprint function, which works similar to Gears of War's Roadie Run, and melee attacks that allow Hayden to punch or slice nearby enemies. The game has no HUD (except for the ammo counter); Hayden's health is shown by the screen flashing red when he takes damage, as well as an indicator showing the attacker's position. If Hayden takes too much damage, the flash speed will increase, and a heartbeat will be heard, indicating Hayden is "bleeding out".

Money, ammo, weapon upgrades, and grenades can be found in set locations. Downed enemies drop their guns, though after his infection, Hayden can only carry these weapons for a few seconds before they self-destruct. Permanent weapons can be purchased and upgraded in black markets, one small weapon for his off-hand use with the Glaive (replacing the pistol) and one large weapon such as a shotgun or rifle.

=== Multiplayer ===
Dark Sector has an online multiplayer mode, where there are two modes of gameplay:

- Infection: one player is randomly selected to be Hayden in a deathmatch against many soldier characters.
- Epidemic: two Haydens on separate teams, the objective being to kill the opposing team's Hayden first.

In both modes, Hayden will have superior powers compared to the soldiers. Hayden will be able to become invisible, use the Glaive, etc., whereas the soldiers cannot.

== Story ==
=== Setting and characters ===
Dark Sector is set in Lasria, a fictional satellite country bordering the Soviet Union, where the military fights against the Technocyte victims, who have largely undergone extreme mutations and have gained abilities.

The player character is Hayden Tenno (voiced by Michael Rosenbaum). An ambivalent CIA agent, he has congenital analgesia, which renders him unable to feel pain. He is supported by Yargo Mensik (voiced by Jürgen Prochnow), an ex-GRU Colonel, scientist, and sleeper agent who knows the origin of the Technocyte virus. The main antagonist, Robert Mezner (voiced by Dwight Schultz), is an ex-CIA agent who seeks to build a utopia by spreading the Technocyte virus across the planet. Supporting Mezner is Nadia (voiced by Julianne Buescher), a mysterious woman whom Hayden knows; and "Nemesis", a metallic, humanoid figure who fights with a long Technocyte blade. Other characters include "the A.D.", Hayden's superior in the CIA; the Blackmarket Dealer, an arms dealer who supplies Hayden with weapons and equipment for his missions; and Viktor Sudek, a captured informant.

=== Plot ===
Near the end of the Cold War, the USSR discovers a sunken submarine off the coast of Lasria; something attacks the salvage crew through a gaping hole in the hull. In the following years, a mysterious infection called "the Technocyte" breaks out in Lasria, causing widespread mutation and destruction before the Lasrians bring it under control.

In the present, Hayden infiltrates a Lasrian gulag compound Robert Mezner is using to hold those infected with the Technocyte virus. His mission is to find Viktor Sudek, prevent the virus's spread, and eliminate Mezner. Finding Viktor, now a loose end and potentially infected, Hayden executes him. Fighting through enemies and planting C4 charges, Hayden encounters an armored humanoid called "Nemesis"; immune to gunfire, it telekinetically deflects an RPG back at Hayden, knocking him off the roof and he passes out. Waking up, Hayden finds himself face-to-face with Mezner, who chastises Hayden for his blind obedience and divulges info about his psychological profile. Nemesis then stabs Hayden's right shoulder, infecting him on Mezner's order, who states that Hayden deserves to suffer the disease's effects. By detonating the explosives, Hayden manages to escape.

His right arm now mutated by Technocyte, Hayden contacts the A.D. who orders him to meet up with Yargo Mensik and obtain boosters to halt the infection. Shortly after, when ambushed by soldiers, his infected arm produces the Glaive; he slowly gains new abilities as the infection progresses while encountering both haz-mat soldiers and infected civilians. He also hears Mezner taunting him telepathically, saying that this change is inevitable. Eventually, Hayden finds Yargo but refuses the medicine, and learns that Mezner wants to recapture the infected with an old transmitter, which emits a signal that attracts the infected to its location, within an old church. Killing a giant ape-like Technocyte monster, Hayden finds the transmitter in the church's catacombs and plants C4 but is held at gunpoint by Nadia, who has a deep-rooted hatred for him and leaves him to the infected.

Contacting the A.D. again, Hayden learns Mezner is using a freighter to export the Technocyte virus. Fighting his way into the cargo hold, he accidentally releases a highly evolved invisible Technocyte monster, which sinks the ship. After Hayden escapes, he learns that Nadia has captured and is torturing Yargo, demanding access into "the Vault" and something within that can control the virus. Disobeying orders to stand down and await the A.D.'s arrival, Hayden fights through a train station and rescues Yargo, who has lost an eye during interrogation. To control his Technocyte-induced pain, Hayden finally attempts to use the booster; before Yargo can warn him about it, Nemesis appears and nearly overwhelms Hayden. Mezner then arrives and offers Hayden a chance to kill him, but also has ability to mentally control Technocyte creatures, including Hayden. With no other choice, Hayden injects himself, breaking Mezner's control over him while simultaneously preventing further mutations; to Mezner's surprise, the booster also nearly kills Hayden. Before Hayden passes out, Mezner reveals that the CIA gave him the same "booster", its true purpose being to prepare them for receiving the virus.

Yargo rescues Hayden and brings him to the Vozro Research Facility, where Technocyte was researched during the Cold War. He admits to having laced Hayden's booster with "enferon", a chemical lethal to Technocyte creatures. He had worried that Hayden would become like Mezner, as both had the same viral strain, but Hayden has retained his humanity, unlike Mezner. Yargo directs Hayden to the facility's sub-basement to get a suit like Nemesis' to give him a fighting chance while Yargo moves through the vents. After fighting through hordes of Technocyte creatures and automated security systems, Hayden finds the suit as Nadia arrives. He pleads with her to leave, but she states that she is already in too deep, and that she will take Yargo to open the Vault. Hayden dons the suit, finally defeating Nemesis, who is revealed to be Nadia all along. Apologizing for infecting Hayden, she tells him Mezner plans to spread Technocyte all across Earth. Before she dies, she gives him the Vault key.

Rendezvousing with the A.D outside the Vault, Hayden learns that a deal had been cut with Mezner for control of the virus. When he gives an outraged Hayden a booster "for the road", Hayden kills him by stabbing him in the neck with it and wipes out the A.D.'s men. Finding Yargo, Hayden gives him the key, telling him to seal the Vault. Inside, Hayden discovers the source of the virus: the USS Alaska, an American G-class submarine. Hayden discovers Mezner with the Technocyte source and transmitter: an enormous, Hydra-like monstrosity. Even after defeating Mezner, the monster, and numerous infected, Yargo tells Hayden that the transmission is still active. Hayden tries to fry the circuitry with his Glaive, but Mezner stuns his mutated right arm. Hayden manages to catch the electrified Glaive with his non-mutated left hand, impaling and frying Mezner's skull with it. With the transmission finally halted, Hayden leaves the Vault, catching the Glaive as he steps outside.

== Development ==
The development of Dark Sector was announced in February 2000 on Digital Extremes' website. The game was originally proposed as a follow-up to Digital Extremes and Epic Games' critically acclaimed multiplayer first-person shooter, Unreal Tournament, but the original plan was scrapped and the game was not spoken of for another four years, during which the game underwent a massive change in focus. The original design had the game keeping in line with its predecessor as a multiplayer arena-style first-person shooter. An in-game cinematic unveiled years later in 2004, gave viewers a brief look at potential storylines and environments, as well as the graphics of the game. Digital Extremes specifically stated that the clips were not pre-rendered and were actual in-game footage. The game was shown as the first example of what a seventh-generation game would look like.

The game was originally intended to take place in a science-fiction environment, in outer space, with players taking the role of a character that inhabits a sleek mechanical suit with powers. The game was officially revealed by Digital Extremes' in late 2005, around the time of the original release of the Xbox 360. In 2006, major overhauls to the game were revealed, showing the main character, and a noticeably less sci-fi setting, although Hayden starts to resemble the originally planned main character as the infection takes over his body. The developers cited a shift in focus by other gaming companies and publishers as the reason for the change to a more modern setting and reducing its sci-fi elements, also adding that they wanted to achieve the realism that fans would enjoy. Another reason was that the tech demo was originally built before the team knew the maximum specifications of the Xbox 360. An interview with GameSpot revealed that the change in setting was intended to make the main character stand out more, as well as making the story more relatable, which they said has been written as a superhero origin story.

Dark Sector was based on the Sector Engine, later changed to the Evolution Engine, both Digital Extremes' proprietary game engines. Statements about this being just a name change or a major shift in their technology were not released to the public yet. Dark Sector project lead, Steve Sinclair, stated that the engine was written from scratch. The producer of Dark Sector, Dave Kudirka, said when they first built the engine, they did not want it to look like the Unreal Engine 3, and they wanted their own perspective engine. When asked about the games' engine being made on the Wii or PC, he replied "plausible". The game went gold on March 7, 2008. The musical score of the game was composed by Keith Power.

The Windows version of Dark Sector was initially planned to be released on the same date as on consoles, but later it was dropped and there were no news on its release. Some sites reported in 2009 that a YouTube video showed Dark Sector running on a PC. It was later confirmed that the game was indeed ported to Windows and was on sale, though only in Russia and the language was Russian by default. Hackers found ways to run the game in English. Aspyr and Noviy Disk published Dark Sector for Microsoft Windows, on March 23, 2009. Optimized by Noviy Disk for the release, the port featured improved graphics and a redesigned interface that made use of mouse and keyboard controls. An English/French version was added to Steam a day later. The PC version's multiplayer mode is only available via local area network play, as the game is a straight port of the console version with no extra code for internet connectivity.

=== Comic ===
A comic titled Dark Sector Zero was released with Dark Sector. Set before the game's main events, it delves into the events that led to Lasria's demise.

== Reception ==
Reception

Aggregate scores
| Aggregator | Score |
|---|---|
| GameRankings | (X360) 73.24% (PS3) 73.14% (PC) 65.22% |
| Metacritic | (X360) 72/100 (PS3) 72/100 (PC) 66/100 |

Review scores
| Publication | Score |
|---|---|
| Destructoid | 7.5/10 |
| Eurogamer | 6/10 |
| Game Informer | 7.5/10 |
| IGN | 7.7/10 |

Dark Sector received mixed reviews. Aggregating review websites GameRankings and Metacritic gave the Xbox 360 version 73.24% and 72/100, the PlayStation 3 version 73.14% and 72/100 and the PC version 65.22% and 66/100. Hyper's Dirk Watch commended the game for "the Glaive and its aftertouch", but he criticized it for its "patchy" AI and "steep" difficulty curve. Greg Howson of The Guardian thought the game was similar to other Gears of War clones except for the Glaive mechanic which he found entertaining, but ultimately called it a solid action game.

=== Ban in Australia ===
In February, before the release in March 2008, the game was banned by the Office of Film and Literature Classification (OFLC) for sale in Australia. Adam Zweck, the sales and product manager for AFA Interactive, the local distributors of Dark Sector, told GameSpot AU that the game was banned due to its violence, in particular the finishing moves. It was later re-released in Australia for the PlayStation 3 on October 9 of the same year, but the violence was censored. In July 2009, Dark Sector was released on the cover disc of PC Powerplay, an Australian PC gaming magazine, although this was the heavily censored version of the game. GamesRadar included it in their list of the 100 most overlooked games of its generation.

== Possible sequel ==
When asked about a sequel in 2008, Steven Sinclair of Digital Extremes stated that there was "nothing definitive" planned, but commented that he would "love to do one", and that Dark Sector only scratched the surface of the character and weapon's potential. Digital Extremes eventually developed a free-to-play game, titled Warframe, which borrows heavily from the original Dark Sector concept video and game.

The original concept for Dark Sector was more similar to what Warframe is now, but was put in a modern setting with a linear, single-player mode due to the industry landscape at the time. As such, Warframe is considered a spiritual successor, and has a handful of nods to Dark Sector. Eventually in a December 2024 update, Warframe added a new area called Höllvania set in 1999, a similar time period to Dark Sector.
