= Epic Pinball =

1993 video game

- CD cover of Epic Pinball: The Complete Collection
- Developer: Digital Extremes
- Publisher: Epic MegaGames
- Designers: James Schmalz; Joe Hitchens; Terry Cumming
- Artists: Robert G. Depew; Joe Hitchens; Mikko Iho; James Schmalz
- Composers: Robert A. Allen; Joshua Jensen
- Platform: MS-DOS
- Release: NA: November 1993
- Genre: Pinball
- Modes: Single-player, multiplayer

Epic Pinball is a 1993 pinball video game developed by James Schmalz and published by Epic MegaGames. The initial release pre-dated Schmalz' Digital Extremes name. The game is played from a 2D top-down view within a scrollable window with plain raster graphics in 320x240. It was noted for being programmed entirely in x86 assembly language for MS-DOS systems.

== Tables ==
The game was originally distributed on floppy disks in 3 separate packs of 4 tables each. The original shareware version (and an early retail version) included only the original "Android" table. Later shareware versions and retail versions contained an updated version called "Super Android" (although it is still referred to as "Android" in the game, the table was changed to say "Super Android").

Release	Table	Notes
Pack 1	"Android"	Included in "Retro Pinball".
Pack 1	"Pot of Gold"	Designed by Terry Cumming.
Pack 1	"Excalibur"	Modelled and based on a pinball table from the 1970s.
Pack 1	"Crash & Burn"	Included in "Retro Pinball".
Pack 2	"Magic"	
Pack 2	"Jungle Pinball"	A tribute to Epic's earlier game Jill of the Jungle.
Pack 2	"Deep Sea"	
Pack 2	"Enigma"	
Pack 3	"Cyborgirl"	Designed by Joe Hitchens.
Pack 3	"Pangaea"	Included in "Retro Pinball".
Pack 3	"Space Journey"	Designed and illustrated by Pixel of Future Crew.
Pack 3	"Toy Factory"	Designed and illustrated by Pixel of Future Crew.

Another table, "African Safari", was included in the "Full Edition" (the CD-ROM version), in addition to the tables from the three packs above.

== Development ==
Tim Sweeney saw some impressive 3D demos done by a group of Finnish developers that were members of the PC demogroup Future Crew and sent Mark Rein to Finland to recruit them. They declined except for Misko Iho who travelled to the US with Mark, bringing back an unfinished version of a pinball game. Unable to convince them to allow Epic MegaGames to finish the game, Tim showed the unfinished game to James Schmalz in Canada. James developed Epic Pinball (with six pinball tables) from scratch in nine months while he was in college. Tim and Mark kept in touch with James to ensure he was on the right track. The graphics were created using Deluxe Paint II and the music was composed using Scream Tracker.

== Releases ==
In 1993, the first registered game included only the first two pinball packs. The following year, xLand Games distributed that very version under the title "Fliper".

In 1994, the "Crash & Burn", "Jungle Pinball", "Enigma", "Cyborgirl" and "Deep Sea" tables were released as individual games by B&N Software and its child company Strange Ranger.

In 1995, all three packs plus the exclusive "African Safari" were released on CD.

In the mid to late 1990s, individual tables were given away as free floppy diskettes to customers of Blockbuster Video upon renting 2 or more items. The promotion lasted only for a few months.

In 2011, the game was partially re-made by Fuse Powered Inc. for Apple's iPhone, iPod Touch and iPad platforms. The game, re-titled as "Retro Pinball", features updated versions of three tables from the original game.

The game was re-released on GOG.com on 30 November 2017, with support for Microsoft Windows, macOS, and Linux pre-packed with DOSBox.

== Reception ==
Reception

Review scores
Publication	Score
PC Format	91%
PC Zone	5/5
PC Power	5/5

Epic Pinball was a major commercial success for its creators, whose internal figures placed it as the third-best-selling shareware product of all time. Designer James Schmalz said in 1999 that Epic Pinball was more successful than anyone imagined it could be. According to Epic's Tim Sweeney, it was the publisher's top-selling shareware game, and Schmalz earned "more than a million dollars from the shareware royalties" in its first year. Ultimately the game sold more than 200,000 copies.

Computer Gaming World in 1994 stated that Epic Pinball was superior to the development team's commercial Silverball and "overall quality is very high". The magazine concluded that the $45 registration fee was a good value for eight boards, as "very few commercial alternatives offer as much without causing your wallet to Tilt!"

== See also ==
- Silverball
- Extreme Pinball
