= Star Trek (2013 video game) =

2013 video game

- Cover art featuring Spock (left) and Kirk
- Developer: Digital Extremes
- Publisher: Namco Bandai Games
- Writer: Marianne Krawczyk
- Composer: Chad Seiter
- Platforms: PlayStation 3, Xbox 360, Microsoft Windows
- Release: NA: April 23, 2013; EU: April 26, 2013
- Genres: Action-adventure, third-person shooter
- Modes: Single-player, multiplayer

Star Trek is a third-person action-adventure Star Trek video game. It was developed by Digital Extremes and published by Namco Bandai Games under license by Paramount Pictures in association with CBS Studios International. The game was released in North America on April 23, 2013, for PlayStation 3, Xbox 360, and Microsoft Windows platforms. It took three years to produce, and was the first in-house video game development by Paramount Studios, who opted not to license development to a third party. The production team aimed for it to be a collaboration with those working on the Star Trek films to avoid the typical pitfalls associated with film tie-in video games. Video games which influenced Star Trek included the Mass Effect series, Uncharted and Metroid Prime, and certain elements of Star Trek reflected episodes of Star Trek: The Original Series such as "Arena" and "Amok Time".

The game is set in the Star Trek Kelvin universe, between the events of the films Star Trek and Star Trek Into Darkness, and follows the adventures of Captain James T. Kirk and the crew of the Starfleet starship USS Enterprise. The player takes control of either Kirk or first officer Spock, and investigates the theft of a terraforming device from the colony of New Vulcan by the Gorn. Together, Kirk and Spock engage the Gorn on away missions, travel to another universe, and re-take Enterprise when alien forces capture it. This two-character gameplay was seen as a unique element, referred to as "bro-op".

The Gorn, who previously appeared in The Original Series and Star Trek: Enterprise, were heavily redesigned, with fifteen different classes of creatures created. A replica of the Gorn costume from "Arena" appeared in a viral advertisement alongside William Shatner, which was intended as a homage to the fight between Kirk and the Gorn from that episode. The game was announced at the Electronic Entertainment Expo 2012, but was particularly panned by critics upon launch in 2013 and sales were poor. Following an issue with the cooperative mode on the PC upon launch, reviewers also criticized a number of issues such as poor lip syncing, clipping, and bad camera angles.

== Gameplay ==
Star Trek is a single-player third-person shooter action game with cooperative gameplay elements, which allow two players to control Kirk and Spock. When playing in the single-player mode, Kirk and Spock have different paths through the missions in order to encourage re-playability. The game does not allow players to switch between Kirk and Spock during a chapter, although this ability was included in preview versions of the game shown to reviewers prior to launch. It does not allow for fellow players to "drop-in" to play alongside co-operatively. In a similar manner to the Gears of War series, the game includes a cover system, which protects the player characters from enemy fire.

The two characters show different gameplay techniques, with Kirk being the more typical shooter while Spock has stealth techniques and can use the Vulcan nerve pinch and mind meld. Each character is equipped with weapons to reflect their gameplay style, with Kirk armed with a phaser equipped with a stunning setting, while Spock's weapon is quieter to reflect his stealthier style of play and freezes enemies instead. As players progress through the game, they gain experience allowing them to unlock additional settings for those weapons. In addition to the weapons, the player characters are equipped with tricorders, which are used to interact with the environment and progress plot points.

During the course of the game, players have to fight their way across a number of environments. The first mission sees Kirk and Spock land on the planet New Vulcan; a colony created by Vulcans following the destruction of their homeworld in the 2009 film. There are further types of gameplay in Star Trek seen in the mini-games that appear throughout, such as those featuring "space dives" as seen in both 2009's Star Trek and 2013's Star Trek Into Darkness. Other elements of the game break from the third-person shooter style. These include swimming levels that have Spock and Kirk move past obstacles using a teleportation gun, and levels featuring turret-based shooting on board Enterprise. Climbing and platforming are built into the terrain exploration elements of the main game.

== Plot ==
=== Background ===
The game takes place within the Star Trek alternate timeline universe, following 2009's Star Trek film and before Star Trek Into Darkness. It follows the adventures of Captain James T. Kirk (voiced by Chris Pine) and his crew on board the Starfleet starship, the USS Enterprise. The first film showed Kirk becoming Captain of the Enterprise for the first time and the formation of the crew, and so the video game shows one of their early missions. The rebooted universe was developed by director J. J. Abrams along with writers Roberto Orci and Alex Kurtzman from the 1960s American television series Star Trek: The Original Series and the six films which followed the crew's adventures.

=== Story ===
In 2259, Enterprise receives a distress call from a space station harvesting the power of a binary star. There is too much interference to beam the crew aboard, so Kirk and Spock (voiced by Zachary Quinto) take a shuttle to rescue the crew. They encounter T'Mar, a childhood friend of Spock, who explains they were gathering energy to power the Helios device, which would speed up the terraforming of New Vulcan; the team inadvertently opened a rip in the fabric of space. Beaming to New Vulcan, Kirk, and Spock meet with T'Mar's father, Surok, who explains the station's power from the base was lost after they were attacked by creatures — who call themselves the Gorn — from the rip. The Gorn infect some of the crew with a virus that makes them aggressive. Kirk and Spock enter the locked-down sections of the base to recover the infected survivors but are unable to stop the Gorn from stealing the Helios device and kidnapping Surok.

Kirk opts to take the infected to a nearby starbase instead of pursuing the Gorn Commander's ship through the Rip. At the starbase, Kirk, Spock, and T'Mar meet with Commodore Daniels, who implies he gave T'Mar the specifications for the device as he knew it would create a wormhole. Suddenly, the Gorn attack the starbase and kidnap T'Mar. Just as he is about to be beamed back aboard Enterprise, Spock tackles the Gorn Henchman, bringing him aboard the ship. Kirk and Spock pursue him to the shuttle bay before he can commandeer a shuttle. Spock mind melds with the Henchman, learning Surok was killed after confessing he has no insight into the device, but that his daughter would. Kirk has the Henchman imprisoned.

Kirk resolves to enter the Rip. After Enterprise enters the Gorn's galaxy, Kirk and Spock take a shuttle with Sulu (voiced by John Cho) and Dr. McCoy (Karl Urban) to a nearby planet. When their shuttle is shot down, Kirk and Spock use wingsuits to glide to a Gorn outpost and blow it up before infiltrating a base to rescue T'Mar. They find Daniels, who is killed in an ensuing firefight. The Gorn brings Kirk and Spock to the Commander, who has them taken to an arena to fight his soldiers to the death. Angered by their besting of his champion, the Commander has Spock infected with the virus and pits him against Kirk. Sulu's shuttle arrives and McCoy shoots Spock with an antidote, while the Commander flees to his ship with T'Mar and the device.

The shuttle returns to Enterprise, which has been taken over by the Gorn. Kirk and Spock space dive to engineering and beam McCoy and Sulu back on board. They help Scotty (voiced by Simon Pegg) and Keenser reactivate the warp core, and restore power to sickbay so McCoy can replicate more of the antidote for airborne dispersal. The duo head to the bridge where the Henchman is holding Uhura (voiced by Zoe Saldaña) hostage, demanding Kirk give them control of the ship. Kirk responds by directing their shuttle to crash into the view-screen, decompressing the Gorn into space. With only an hour before the Rip closes, Kirk and Spock space dive to the Gorn Commander's ship, where they disable the targeting platform to give Enterprise a fighting chance and enter the core where T'Mar and the device are being held. Kirk and Spock destroy the device, defeat the Commander, and are beamed back to Enterprise with T'Mar. Enterprise warps back to the Milky Way Galaxy before the Rip closes; in their closing logs, Kirk and Spock state T'Mar has recovered enough to continue working on New Vulcan, and that they have been ordered to Nibiru.

== Development ==
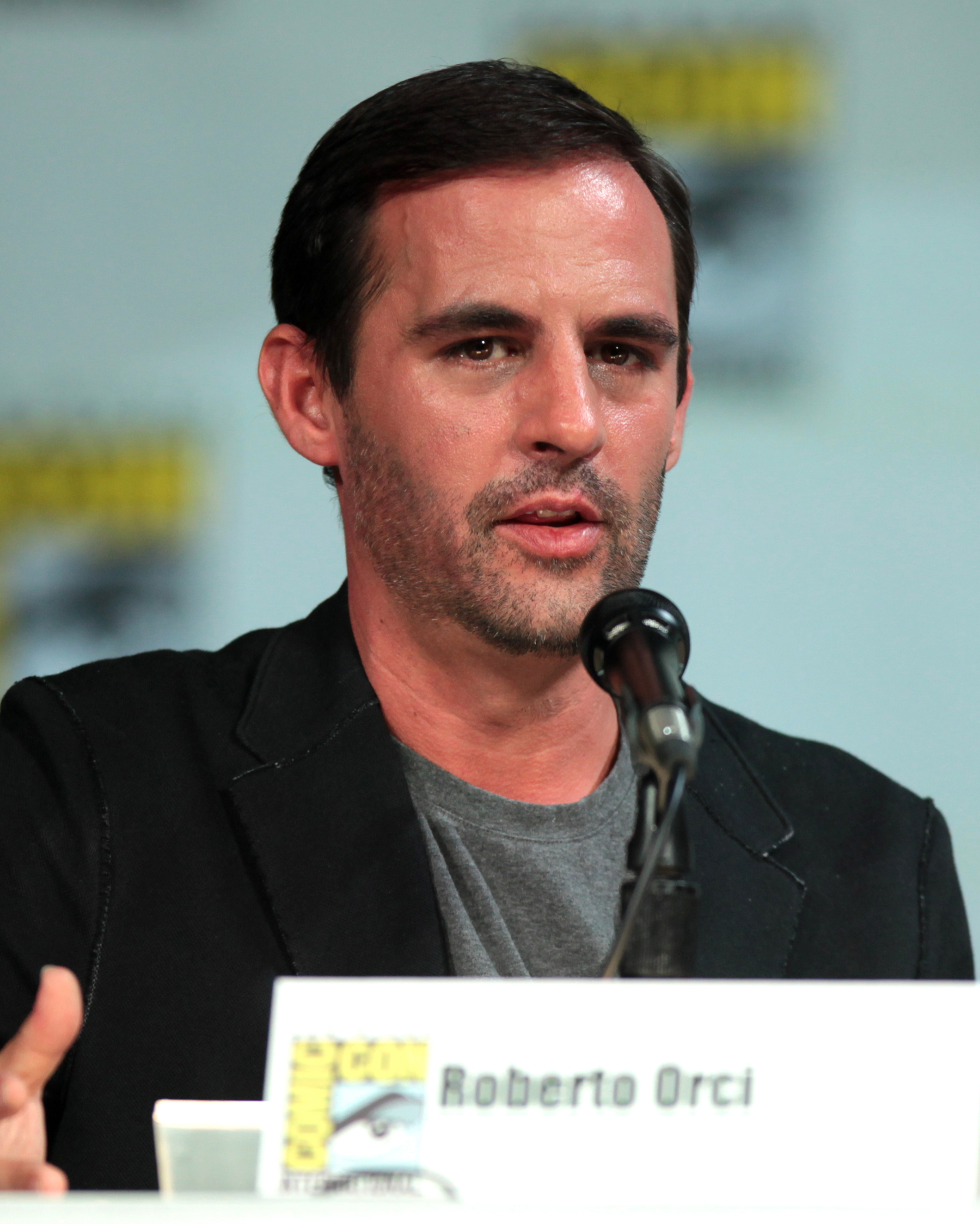
Writer Robert Orci was involving in the production of the plot of Star Trek.

Production of Star Trek began three years before release under Tom Lesinski at Paramount Digital Entertainment. Lesinkski had a background in video game production, having previously worked at companies such as Crystal Dynamics, Ion Storm and Kuju Entertainment. He made the decision to produce a game in-house, rather than licensing it out to a third party as had previously been the case under the previous ten-year Activision contract. As a result, the game was the first to be produced and released by Paramount Studios directly.

Lesinski was terminated by Paramount in September 2011. The project was passed to Brian Miller, Vice President of Paramount Digital Entertainment. Miller later explained that he wanted the production to avoid the mistakes typically made in movie tie-in games involved a lack of time devoted to the production, and excluding the people working on the film from work on the game. Miller hoped that they had rectified these issues with Star Trek, and explained that they had not produced a similar game to tie in with 2009's Star Trek film because it would have suffered from those problems. He expressed disappointment at the quality of previous in-universe games and wanted the new Star Trek to be "a triple-A game" and something that the franchise deserved.

The idea for the game came out of a brainstorming session in which it was decided that the game should allow the gamer to play as Kirk and Spock and therefore should be featuring co-op style gameplay. During his E3 pitch, Steve Sinclair described the game's genre as "bro-op". It was created by Digital Extremes, who had previously created video games such as Unreal and worked on the PlayStation 3 port of BioShock.

The plot of the game was written by Marianne Krawczyk, who had previously worked on games such as God of War and Shank. She developed the plot in conjunction with the producers of the film, Alex Kurtzman and Bob Orci, as well as a writer Damon Lindelof. In an interview in 2011, Orci explained that the storyline of the game was designed to be canon for the new Star Trek universe. He clarified in 2013 that it was "as close to canon as any Star Trek game will ever come" as the mission described by the game could have taken place between 2009's Star Trek and Star Trek Into Darkness. Concept design work for the game was created by artist Fernando Acosta.

While developing the game, the production team sought to use elements of other games as influences on how to create a Star Trek based game that was along the same lines as the 2009 film. Digital Extremes creative director Sheldon Carter described this as "It's like someone spliced Metroid Prime into my Uncharted". Miller explained that it was due to the success of the Mass Effect series of games that allowed for space-based adventure games such as Star Trek to be made, although they were not seeking to include the role-playing elements seen in that series. Miller explained that there was a "circular influence" with each franchise influenced by the other. Further influences were found in The Original Series, as one level which pits Spock against Kirk was inspired by a similar scene in the episode "Amok Time", originally broadcast on television just under 47 years before the launch of the game. While it was intended to be a cross-platform launch, the producers decided not to incorporate hands-free gaming using either Kinect or the PlayStation Move.

=== The Gorn ===
More than just lizard-skinned foes, the Gorn are a blood-thirsty race determined to conquer the galaxy. A true military dictatorship, the Gorn are made up of billions of self-sacrificing warriors across thousands of colonies, each focused on the conquest of alien races. By utilizing their chaos-causing infectious venom, the Gorn seed mayhem and destruction as they destroy populations and deplete planets of their resources.

— Namco Bandai press release, June 2012

It was decided early on in the development to include the Gorn as the main enemies. At the same time, J. J. Abrams had joked that he was planning to include the aliens in his second Star Trek film. They had previously been seen in The Original Series episode "Arena" and the Star Trek: Enterprise episode "In A Mirror, Darkly", and the producers saw the game as an opportunity to redevelop the lizard race including the addition of fifteen different classes/species.

The official Star Trek website previewed several of these new types of Gorn, releasing information on a "Gorn Day" each week. The first to be featured were the Gorn Commander and the Sentinel class. These were described as the elite of the Gorn, with only one Commander appearing in the game, while the Sentinels were slightly shorter versions of the same type of Gorn, armed with different weapons. The Gorn Henchman is one of the main antagonists, and reports directly to the Commander. He first appears on the New Vulcan level, and is one of the Gorn along with the Scout class that can hide their appearance.

The Gorn champion in the arena sequence was based on the Gorn Captain seen in "Arena". This particular character was intended to be different from all others and thought to be "abnormal" compared to other members of his race. Other elements of the version of the Gorn seen in The Original Series, such as the eye design, were included in the class known as Rushers. However the Rusher class are different from other types of Gorn seen in the game, as they are quadrupeds and unarmed with the exception of their claws and teeth. Similar to Rushers, Brunts are also unarmed, but they are more heavily armored and have the ability to destroy obstacles that supply cover for the player.

The more typical soldier types of the Gorn are the Initiates, Warriors, and Guardians. The former is the basic troops of the Gorn forces, and while they can run on four legs, they fight on two with an automatic rifle called the Ravager. The Warriors are more advanced, and carry a variety of weaponry along with basic armor. The Guardian type differs in that it is a melee type, armed with a large energy axe. However, the energy from the axe can also produce a shield to protect the holder as well. They are more advanced than both the Initiate and the Warrior classes in that they spend the vast majority of their time on two feet only. Of these fifteen classes, three were created to appear female.

=== Audio ===
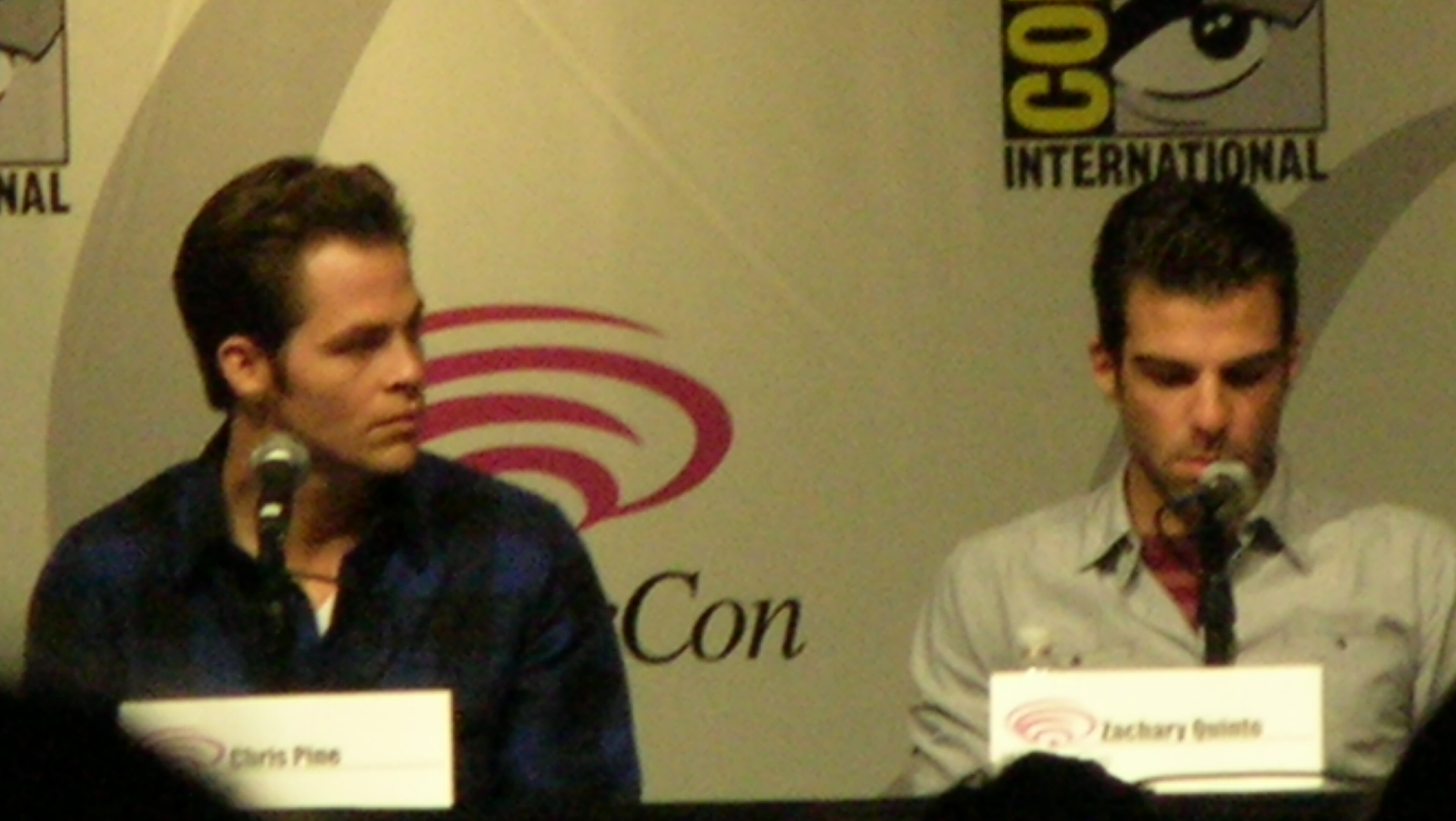
Chris Pine and Zachary Quinto were two of the actors who lent their voices to Star Trek.

Paramount secured the likeness rights of Chris Pine and Zachary Quinto in the summer of 2011 for an upcoming game based on the universe of the film Star Trek (2009). It was not until a year later in June 2012 that the voice work contracts were signed for the pair, and it was also announced that the likeness rights and voice acting of the rest of the main cast from the film had been secured. Some cast members such as Simon Pegg improvised parts of their performances. Quinto praised the positive experience in the recording studio and said that "it was nice to be able to play the character and not have to do all this physical stuff".

The game was scored by Chad Seiter, who had previously worked with Michael Giacchino, the composer for the music in the 2009 film and Star Trek Into Darkness. The duo had worked together on the Star Trek film, with Seiter being one of Giacchino's additional orchestrators. For the video game, Seiter used Digital Performer, a digital audio workstation/sequencer software package published by Mark of the Unicorn. The game featured music from Giacchino's score for the 2009 film.

=== Launch issues ===
Upon the game's release, there was an issue with the cooperative mode on the PC. Reviewers were sent a Steam download code to play the game while waiting for their console versions to arrive in the mail and upon attempting to launch the co-op mode, players were given the error message "Could not join. The game session is no longer available." However, this affected a number of gamers playing via Steam on the PC, resulting in a statement being issued by the Twitter account for the game and an email being sent to customers, stating the company was looking into the problems. At the same time, players of Dead Island: Riptide were having similar issues on Steam.

Following inquiries by the media, Paramount and Namco released a joint statement explaining that it was an issue with the Steam system and was something that the company was seeking to fix shortly. While others stated issues with co-op gameplay on the PS3, the companies stated that they were not aware of any issues and recommended that faults should be reported via Twitter. After the PC issue was rectified, a further statement was published to alert customers that they could now use this type of gameplay. A day after the co-op issues with Star Trek were resolved, the Dead Island: Riptide problems were also corrected, with speculation by reviewers presuming that it was the same error in both games.

== Marketing ==
=== Promotion ===
The game made its debut at the 2012 E3 convention in 2011, where it was revealed that the Gorn would be the game's antagonists. Reviewers viewed a twenty-minute excerpt of footage from the game in 3D and with surround sound. The game was scheduled for release three weeks before Into Darkness premiered in theaters on May 17, 2013. Brian Miller was heavily involved in promoting the game, and regularly featured in interviews with websites and magazines. Following E3 there were concerns from fans that the game would be a straightforward shooter in the Star Trek universe, Miller said, "You will have elements of a shooter. You'll have elements of exploration, adventure, and discovery. That is what the new Star Trek is about."

An in-browser flash social strategy game entitled Star Trek: New Vulcan Reborn was made by Harkable to promote the game. It was set on New Vulcan with the player helping to develop the planet by "building landing pads, founding water treatment centres, establishing mining rigs and more." An IGN competition took place where players with the most points could win prizes. The game is no longer available to play.

=== Trailers ===
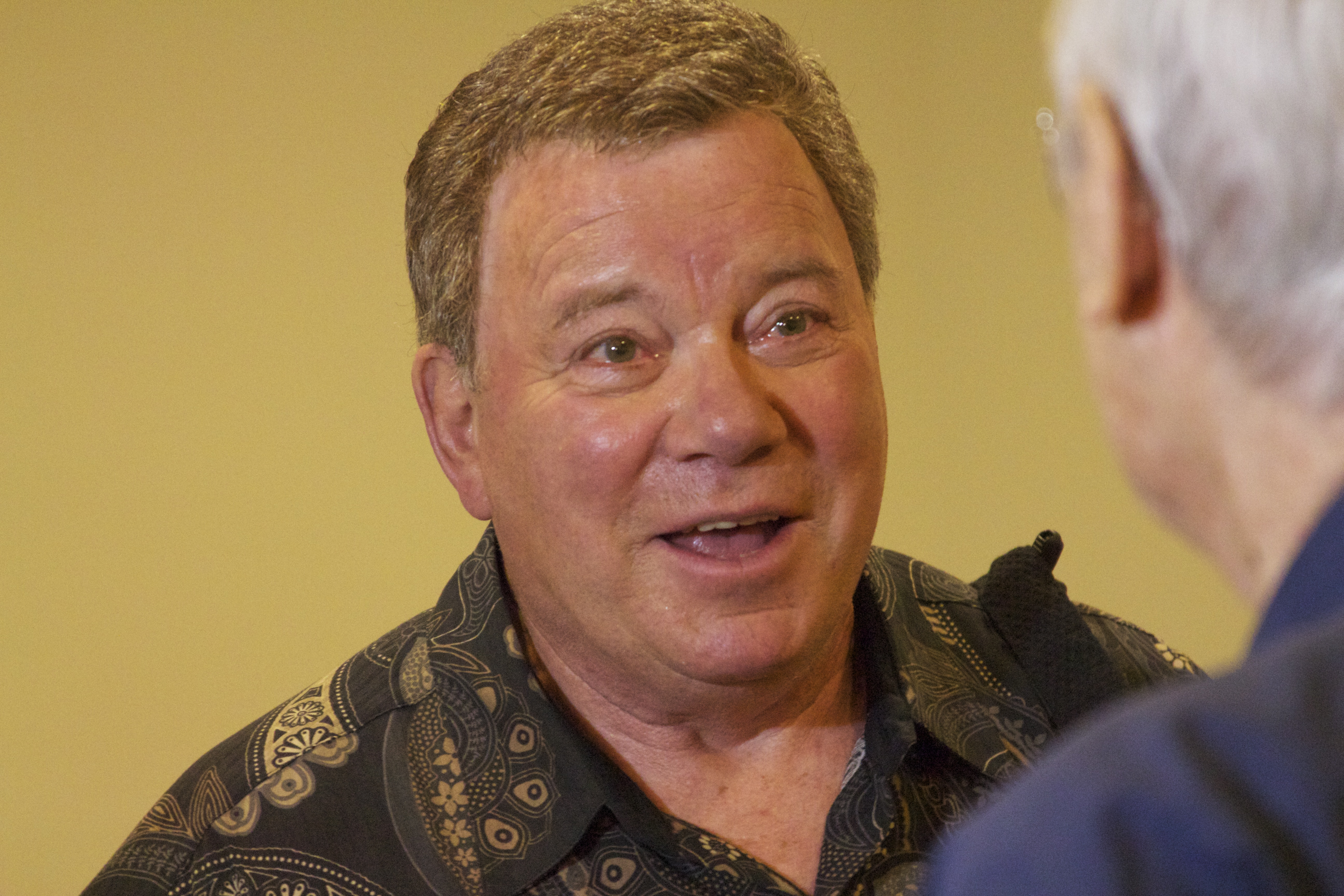
William Shatner revisited his fight with a Gorn from "Arena" in a trailer for Star Trek.

The first trailer for the game made its début at the Namco Bandai Global Gamer Day in Las Vegas in April 2012 and showed gameplay footage in 3D. In order to promote the new video game in 2013, a trailer was produced which featured William Shatner and a man in a Gorn suit playing it on a console. The idea had come from an idea by Brian Miller and Gene Augusto, who initially went back and forth on the idea in an attempt to create something that would go viral. They joked about using the line "not your father's Star Trek", and sought to recreate the fight between Shatner and the Gorn from the episode "Arena".

The trailer featured Shatner using some classic Kirk fighting moves, including a judo chop and an ear clap, and in a homage to the original it had the Gorn throw couch cushions rather than the polystyrene rocks in the original episode. The Gorn outfit worn by a stuntman was a replica of the original, which had mostly been destroyed with the exception of the head, which was sold at auction in 2006.

=== Downloadable content ===
On January 8, 2013, four months before the game's release date, the downloadable content Elite Officer Pack was announced for pre-orders allowing players to change in game character skins as well as giving Kirk and Spock new weapons and sidearms. Skins offered include Kirk's leather jacket and Spock's Vulcan Science Academy outfit. Further skins include, "Kobuyashi Maru", Starfleet Cadet (Kirk), Starfleet Officer Dress Uniform (Spock), stealth outfits, and those from the USS Kelvin. Players can change Kirk and Spock's sidearms; Kirk's sidearms are the Captain's Phaser and the Starfleet Academy Phaser, while Spock uses the "Vulcan Repeater" and the USS Kelvin Phaser. Other Weapons include for the stealth suit: the Starfleet Type IV Stealth Sniper Rifle, which comes with extra ammo. DLC is no longer available.

== Reception ==
Reception

Aggregate score
| Aggregator | Score | | |
| Aggregator | PC | PS3 | Xbox 360 |
|---|---|---|---|
| Metacritic | 43/100 | 45/100 | 42/100 |

Review scores
| Publication | Score | | |
| Publication | PC | PS3 | Xbox 360 |
|---|---|---|---|
| Edge | N/A | N/A | 4/10 |
| Eurogamer | 6/10 | N/A | N/A |
| Game Informer | 5.75/10 | 5.75/10 | 5.75/10 |
| GameRevolution | N/A | N/A | 2/10 |
| GameSpot | 3.5/10 | N/A | N/A |
| Giant Bomb | N/A | 2/5 | N/A |
| IGN | 4.2/10 | 4.2/10 | 4.2/10 |
| PlayStation Official Magazine – Australia | N/A | 5/10 | N/A |
| PlayStation Official Magazine – UK | N/A | 6/10 | N/A |
| Official Xbox Magazine (UK) | N/A | N/A | 3/10 |
| PC Gamer (UK) | 45/100 | N/A | N/A |
| VideoGamer.com | 3/10 | 3/10 | 3/10 |

Star Trek was released in the United States on April 23, 2013, and three days later in Europe. This release was designed to coincide with the theatrical launch of the latest Star Trek film, Star Trek Into Darkness. The game sold poorly; after three weeks on sale, 140,000 copies had been sold across all platforms. It failed to reach the top 100 best video games list of 2013. Critics labelled the game as a flop.

Star Trek received mostly negative reviews. The review aggregator website Metacritic gave the Xbox 360 edition of the game a score of 42 percent, the PC edition 43 percent, and the PS3 version was given a score of 45 percent.

Dan Stapleton for IGN described it as "a barely serviceable, paint-by-numbers third-person shooter". He wrote that both playable characters were too similar, the combat was "completely generic" and that errors in the animation looked clumsy with "objects clipping through each other; crazy, badly lip-synced dialog (not that syncing it with this corny writing would fix it); and general screwups make Star Trek play like a blooper reel." Stapleton was surprised that the game continued to be playable, as he noted that several scripted events during the game failed to start as scheduled. He also felt that the mini-games throughout the game were "so mind-numbingly simple and repetitive and/or frustrating they made me eager to get back to just being bored." He said that the game seemed unfinished, and gave it an overall score of 4.2 out of ten. Edge magazine said that the game "[has] more bugs crawling on it than a Fear Factor contestant", and mentioned issues such as the characters running through walls, enemies becoming immortal and camera angles showing the inside of Kirk or Spock's skull. Star Trek was otherwise described as bland, even running through to the achievements with boring titles and the co-op system "succumbs to awkward banter and gimmicky co-op puzzles".

Mark Walton, while writing for GameSpot, thought that the general idea for the game was good, but that the gameplay was "tiresome" and failed to excite. He said that the animation was "woefully bad", and there were several bugs such as the cover taking mechanism failing to work on several occasions. An attempt to bring variety to the game through minigames was seen as "a poor mishmash of those from other games", and compared those sections to other games such as Portal and the Uncharted series. Walton explained that the game made "small wins" by including the voice acting from the same cast as the movie, but said that there were "too many glaring problems" with the game to find something to like. He gave it a score of 3.5 out of ten for the version on PC.

Star Trek Into Darkness director J. J. Abrams stated in September 2013 that he was hurt by the game's poor reception and quality, saying that it was "obviously a big disappointment". He also claimed it hurt Star Trek Into Darkness by being released shortly before the film. Later, in November 2013, Digital Extremes creative director Stephen Sinclair said to IGN that he was "kind of surprised [...] to see one of the most awesome, popular and successful film directors working today slagging on that project". Video game insiders linked the poor reception of the game to the departure of Brian Miller in his role as the Senior Vice President of Paramount, as he had been heavily involved in the marketing for the game. Insiders had specifically attributed issues with the game to the "ego" of both Miller and his predecessor Lesinski, "insisted this hallowed and cherished franchise was a key brand extension in the gaming vertical only to be compromised by disastrous results and reviews".

In 2016, Den of Geek ranked Star Trek as one of the five worst Star Trek games.
