= Canadian Game Awards =

Canadian video game awards ceremony

- Native name: French: Prix du Jeu Canadien
- Awarded for: Achievements in the Canadian video game industry
- Venue: Various
- Country: Canada
- First award: September 19, 2020; 6 years ago
- Website: canadiangameawards.ca

Livestream coverage
- Produced by: Northern Arena Productions
- Directed by: Carl-Edwin Michel

Canadian Videogame Awards
- Native name: French: Prix Canadiens du Jeu Video
- Awarded for: Achievements in the Canadian video game industry
- Venue: Various
- Country: Canada
- First award: May 5, 2010; 16 years ago
- Final award: November 15, 2016; 10 years ago
- Website: Archived from the original

Livestream coverage
- Produced by: Canadian League of Gamers
- Directed by: Victor Lucas

The Canadian Game Awards (French: Prix du Jeu Canadien) is an annual awards ceremony dedicated to achievements in the Canadian video game industry. It does not have a specific focus on games produced entirely in Canada, but also includes those with a significant amount of Canadian production staff. The show also highlights actors, esports athletes, and content creators who are from the country or contributed to local productions, even featuring them as presenters. As of 2023, the show is produced by Northern Arena Productions.

It is not the first Canadian awards ceremony dedicated to video games, and is a successor to the Canadian Videogame Awards that ran in the 2010s until their cancellation in 2017. Carl-Edwin Michel, the creator and executive of the Canadian Game Awards, had also worked on the Canadian Videogame Awards in its final years. The Canadian Game Awards began as an online event in 2020 during the COVID-19 pandemic and switched to an in-person format in 2023. The show took a year off in 2024 after the 2023 edition had experienced difficulties in its production.

Starting in 2022, a sister show titled the Canadian Indie Game Awards was launched. This event had a specific focus on indie games and studios. In 2025, it was merged into the main show.

== History ==
=== Canadian Videogame Awards ===
In 2010, the first Canadian Videogame Awards was held in Vancouver ahead of GDC Canada. The show was produced by the Canadian League of Gamers with support from DigiBC, Reboot Communications, and Greedy Productions. It had also received sponsorships from Xbox, PlayStation, The Georgia Straight, and G4. Dragon Age: Origins won Game of the Year. The other nominees were Assassin's Creed II, Warhammer 40,000: Dawn of War II, FIFA 10, and Might & Magic: Clash of Heroes. Dragon Age: Origins was a multi-award winner, having won Best Writing as well. Assassin's Creed II won the most awards in total, taking Best Console Game, Best Visual Arts, Best Game Design, and Best Technology (which it shared with Prototype).

The 2013 edition of the awards was held with Fan Expo Vancouver, and was aired on Citytv stations nationwide with several weekend repeats on G4 Canada. Far Cry 3 won six awards in total, including the Game of the Year award and the Future Shop Fans' Choice Award. Mass Effect 3 was the runner-up with three wins, including Best Console Game.

In 2014, the show moved to November rather than being held in the first half of the year. This left a big gap from the previous edition of the show, so games from 2013 were included alongside those released in 2014. Furthermore, the event was moved to The Carlu in Toronto. Each year had its own set of winners for each award. Assassin's Creed IV: Black Flag was Game of the Year for 2013, and Watch Dogs was Game of the Year for 2014.

Another move occurred for the 2015 edition of the show, which took place in the Mattamy Athletic Centre. Reboot Communications also announced an agreement with Swaf Media to co-produce future iterations of the Canadian Videogame Awards. This agreement also included a new initiative called the CVA FanFest, a fan convention to take place alongside the awards show. Reboot communications described this as being a long-term arrangement. The convention featured game demos, Counter-Strike tournaments, and gaming merchandise. Assassin's Creed Syndicate secured the Game of the Year award.

Yet another change in venue happened in 2016, this time to the Palais des congrès de Montréal to coincide with the Montréal International Games Summit. This time, Deus Ex: Mankind Divided was crowned as the Game of the Year winner. This would be the final iteration of the Canadian Videogame Awards.

The 2017 edition was set to take place alongside many other cultural events for 150th anniversary of Canada in Ottawa. It also was slated to include a gaming tournament called the Canadian Videogame Happening. However, on 17 August 2017, it was announced that the Canadian League of Gamers would no longer be organizing the show on behalf of the video game industry in Canada and that the event was cancelled.

==== Shows presented by the Canadian Videogame Awards ====
Event	Date	Game of the Year	Venue
2010	May 5	Dragon Age: Origins	Vancouver Convention Centre
2011	May 18	Mass Effect 2	Vancouver Convention Centre
2012	April 21	FIFA 12	Vancouver Convention Centre
2013	April 20	Far Cry 3	Vancouver Convention Centre
2014	November 21	Assassin's Creed IV: Black Flag (2013)	The Carlu (Toronto)
2014	November 21	Watch Dogs (2014)	The Carlu (Toronto)
2015	December 6	Assassin's Creed Syndicate	Mattamy Athletic Centre (Toronto)
2016	November 15	Deus Ex: Mankind Divided	Palais des congrès de Montréal

=== Canadian Game Awards ===
According to the producer, Carl-Edwin Michel, a major motivator for the awards show is highlighting that many games are produced entirely or in part by Canadian staff. Examples cited by him include Mass Effect, Assassin's Creed, EA Sports FC, Dead by Daylight, Warframe, Cuphead, and Celeste. Furthermore, with Canada having the third-largest games industry in the world but no equivalent to the British Academy Games Awards in the United Kingdom or The Game Awards in the United States, there was seemingly no celebration for Canadian creators.

The 2026 Canadian Game Awards saw the start of a partnership with XP Gaming, seeing it be hosted alongside the XP Gaming Summit in Toronto. Jennifer Hale and Mark Meer were invited to host the event, both known for voicing the female and male variants of Commander Shepard in the Mass Effect series. Patricia Summersett, the voice actor of Princess Zelda in The Legend of Zelda: Breath of the Wild and The Legend of Zelda: Tears of the Kingdom, was also invited as a presenter. Victor Lucas was awarded with an honorary award for his work on The Electric Playground. It was a television series that served as a stepping stone into the industry for numerous prolific individuals such as Geoff Keighley and Jade Raymond.

==== Shows presented by the Canadian Game Awards ====
Event	Date	Game of the Year	Studio of the Year	Venue
2020	September 19	Cadence of Hyrule	Klei Entertainment	Virtual event
2021	April 10	Assassin's Creed Valhalla	Certain Affinity Toronto	Virtual event
2022	April 9	Marvel's Guardians of the Galaxy	Ubisoft Toronto	Virtual event
2023	April 21	Tunic	TUNIC Team / ISOMETRICORP Games	Daniels Spectrum (Toronto)
2025	February 26	Balatro	LocalThunk	TIFF Lightbox (Toronto)
2026	May 21	South of Midnight	Compulsion Games	John Bassett Theatre (Toronto)

==== Shows presented by the Canadian Indie Game Awards ====
Event	Date	Game of the Year	Venue
2022	April 8	Echo Generation	Virtual event
2023	April 20	Tunic	Artscape Daniels Launchpad (Toronto)

== Eligibility ==
As of 2023, the eligibility criteria to be a Canadian Game Awards nominee is as follows:

- A nominee must have Canadian citizenship or permanent residency
- One of the following must apply:
  - The developer is Canadian
  - Over 51% of the game is developed in Canada
  - A publisher or studio spearheading the project is Canadian
- The game was released between January 1 and December 31 in the year before the show
- Ports are not eligible unless it is a new version with extra content developed by a Canadian studio
- Early access games are only eligible if the game is available to the public
- Canadian actors, audio studios, composers, etc. may submit work done on a foreign-made game for consideration
- Any additional content for a game is eligible as long as it was released in the year before the show

== Winners ==
The following are the games, studios, individuals and organizations which have won awards. In brackets are the studios and organizations that are associated with the winning games and individuals. For tables including all nominees, the winner is at the top of the list and marked in bold. The awards were given to the Canadian studios on each game, so their names are typically listed even if others were involved or leading the production.

=== Canadian Videogame Awards ===
==== CVA 2010 ====
Award	Winner
Game of the Year	**Dragon Age: Origins (BioWare)**; Assassin's Creed II (Ubisoft Montréal); Warhammer 40,000: Dawn of War II (Relic Entertainment); FIFA 10 (EA Canada); Might & Magic: Clash of Heroes (Capybara Games)
Best Console Game	**Assassin's Creed II (Ubisoft Montréal)**; Warhammer 40,000: Dawn of War II (Relic Entertainment); FIFA 10 (EA Canada); NHL 10 (EA Canada); Prototype (Radical Entertainment)
Best Handheld Game	**Might & Magic: Clash of Heroes (Capybara Games)**; Battle of Giants: Dragons (Ubisoft Québec); LEGO Battles (Hellbent Games); MySims Racing (Artificial Mind & Movement); Pandemica (XMG Studio)
Best Downloadable Game	**Critter Crunch (Capybara Games)**; Implode! (IUGO Mobile Entertainment); Osmos (Hemisphere Games); Pandemica (XMG Studio); Super Monkey Ball 2 (Other Ocean Interactive)
Best Audio	**Warhammer 40,000: Dawn of War II (Relic Entertainment)**; Assassin's Creed II (Ubisoft Montréal); Dragon Age: Origins (BioWare); Skate 2 (EA Black Box); WET (Artificial Mind & Movement)
Best Game Design	**Assassin's Creed II (Ubisoft Montréal)**; Warhammer 40,000: Dawn of War II (Relic Entertainment); Might & Magic: Clash of Heroes (Capybara Games); NHL 10 (EA Canada); Prototype (Radical Entertainment)
Best Technology	**Assassin's Creed II (Ubisoft Montréal)**; **Prototype (Radical Entertainment)**; FIFA 10 (EA Canada); Fight Night: Round 4 (EA Canada); Skate 2 (EA Black Box)
Best Visual Arts	**Assassin's Creed II (Ubisoft Montréal)**; Academy of Champions: Soccer (Ubisoft Vancouver); Dragon Age: Origins (BioWare); Fight Night: Round 4 (EA Canada); Punch-Out!! (Next Level Games)
Best Writing	**Dragon Age: Origins (BioWare)**; Assassin's Creed II (Ubisoft Montréal); Prototype (Radical Entertainment); WET (Artificial Mind & Movement)
Best In-Game Cinematic	**Ghostbusters: The Video Game (Rainmaker Entertainment)**; LEGO Battles (Hellbent Games); NBA Live 10 (EA Canada); Prototype (Artificial Mind & Movement)
Most Promising Game	**ModNation Racers (United Front Games)**; Dead Rising 2 (Blue Castle Games); Deus Ex: Human Revolution (Eidos-Montréal); Need for Speed: World (EA Black Box); TRON: Evolution (Propaganda Games)

==== CVA 2011 ====
Award	Winner
Game of the Year	**Mass Effect 2 (BioWare)**; Assassin's Creed Brotherhood (Ubisoft Montréal); Dead Rising 2 (Blue Castle Games); FIFA 11 (EA Canada); Tom Clancy's Splinter Cell: Conviction (Ubisoft Montréal)
Best Console Game	**Mass Effect 2 (BioWare)**; Assassin's Creed Brotherhood (Ubisoft Montréal); Dead Rising 2 (Blue Castle Games); FIFA 11 (EA Canada); Tom Clancy's Splinter Cell: Conviction (Ubisoft Montréal)
Best Game on the Go	**Osmos (Hemisphere Games)**; Lil' Pirates (IUGO Mobile Entertainment); Scrabble (EA Mobile Montréal); A Space Shooter for 2 Bucks! (Frima Studio); Trainyard (Matt Prix)
Best Downloadable Game	**DeathSpank (Hothead Games)**; Dead Rising 2: Case Zero (Blue Castle Games); HOARD (Big Sandwich Games); Shank (Klei Entertainment); A Space Shooter for 2 Bucks! (Frima Studio)
Best Audio	**Assassin's Creed Brotherhood (Ubisoft Montréal)**; Warhammer 40,000: Dawn of War II – Chaos Rising (Relic Entertainment); Mass Effect 2 (BioWare); Spider-Man: Shattered Dimensions (Beenox); Tom Clancy's Splinter Cell: Conviction (Ubisoft Montréal)
Best Social/Casual Game	**Pocket God (Frima Studio)**; Dex Hamilton's Bug Quest (March Entertainment); GardenMind (Inspirado Games); Mercenaries of War (Kaboom Games); Pot Farm (Brain Warp Studio)
Best Game Design	**Mass Effect 2 (BioWare)**; Assassin's Creed Brotherhood (Ubisoft Montréal); DeathSpank (Hothead Games); Tom Clancy's Splinter Cell: Conviction (Ubisoft Montréal); Trainyard (Matt Rix)
Best Technology	**Kinect (BigPark / Microsoft)**; Assassin's Creed Brotherhood (Ubisoft Montréal); Mass Effect 2 (BioWare); Scrabble (EA Mobile Montréal); Your Shape: Fitness Evolved (Ubisoft Montréal)
Best Visual Arts	**Assassin's Creed Brotherhood (Ubisoft Montréal)**; Mass Effect 2 (BioWare); Spider-Man: Shattered Dimensions (Beenox); Tom Clancy's Splinter Cell: Conviction (Ubisoft Montréal); TRON: Evolution (Propaganda Games)
Best Writing	**Mass Effect 2 (BioWare)**; Assassin's Creed Brotherhood (Ubisoft Montréal); Warhammer 40,000: Dawn of War II – Chaos Rising (Relic Entertainment); Prince of Persia: The Forgotten Sands (Ubisoft Montréal); Tom Clancy's Splinter Cell: Conviction (Ubisoft Montréal)
Best Student Game	**WOMP! (XnEh?)**; Codex (Good Guy Robots); Ginkgo (Christopher Frankline, Jennifer Chu, Ryan Pelcz, Nick Younge and Lisa Trac); Hootlin (Team Temps)
Innovation Award	**ModNation Racers (United Front Games)**; Kinect Joy Ride (BigPark); Scrabble (EA Mobile Montréal); Spider-Man: Shattered Dimensions (Beenox); Your Shape: Fitness Evolved (Ubisoft Montréal)

==== CVA 2012 ====
Award	Winner
Game of the Year	**FIFA 12 (EA Canada)**; Assassin's Creed Revelations (Ubisoft Montréal); Deus Ex: Human Revolution (Eidos-Montréal); Fight Night Champion (EA Canada); Superbrothers: Sword & Sworcery EP (Capybara Games)
Best Console Game	**Deus Ex: Human Revolution (Eidos-Montréal)**; Assassin's Creed Revelations (Ubisoft Montréal); Dragon Age II (BioWare); FIFA 12 (EA Canada); Fight Night Champion (EA Canada)
Best Game on the Go	**Superbrothers: Sword & Sworcery EP (Capybara Games)**; A Space Shooter for Free (Frima Studio); Assassin's Creed Revelations (Ubisoft Montréal); Squibble (MassHabit Games); Super Stickman Golf (Noodlecake Studios)
Best Downloadable Game	**Superbrothers: Sword & Sworcery EP (Capybara Games)**; Capsized (Alientrap); Might & Magic: Clash of Heroes (Capybara Games); Swarm (Hothead Games); Tales From Space: About a Blob (Drinkbox Studios)
Best Audio	**Deus Ex: Human Revolution (Eidos-Montréal)**; Assassin's Creed Revelations (Ubisoft Montréal); Fight Night Champion (EA Canada); Need for Speed: The Run (EA Black Box); Warhammer 40,000: Space Marine (Relic Entertainment)
Best Social/Casual Game	**Margaritaville Online (Exploding Barrel Games)**; Cranky Cat (March Entertainment); GreenSpace (RocketOwl); Sissy's Magical Ponycorn Adventure (Untold Entertainment)
Best Game Design	**Deus Ex: Human Revolution (Eidos-Montréal)**; Assassin's Creed Revelations (Ubisoft Montréal); Dead Rising 2: Off the Record (Capcom Vancouver); Superbrothers: Sword & Sworcery EP (Capybara Games); Warhammer 40,000: Space Marine (Relic Entertainment)
Best Technology	**Your Shape: Fitness Evolved 2012 (Ubisoft Montréal)**; Assassin's Creed Revelations (Ubisoft Montréal); FIFA 12 (EA Canada); Just Dance 3 (Ubisoft Montréal); Warhammer 40,000: Space Marine (Relic Entertainment)
Best Visual Arts	**Assassin's Creed Revelations (Ubisoft Montréal)**; Deus Ex: Human Revolution (Eidos-Montréal); Need for Speed: The Run (EA Black Box); Superbrothers: Sword & Sworcery EP (Capybara Games); Warhammer 40,000: Space Marine (Relic Entertainment)
Best Writing	**Deus Ex: Human Revolution (Eidos-Montréal)**; Assassin's Creed Revelations (Ubisoft Montréal); Superbrothers: Sword & Sworcery EP (Capybara Games); To the Moon (Freebird Games)
Best Indie Game	**Superbrothers: Sword & Sworcery EP (Capybara Games)**; Capsized (Alientrap); DLC Quest (Going Loud Studios); Super Stickman Golf (Noodlecake Studios); Tales from Space: About a Blob (Drinkbox Studios)
Best New Character	**Adam Jenson in Deus Ex: Human Revolution (Eidos-Montréal)**; Sissy in Sissy's Magical Ponycorn Adventure (Untold Entertainment); The Blob in Tales from Space: About a Blob (Drinkbox Studio); Captain Titus in Warhammer 40,000: Space Marine (Relic Entertainment); Yeti in Yeti (Metanet Software)
Best Original Music	**Superbrothers: Sword & Sworcery EP (Capybara Games)**; Assassin's Creed Revelations (Ubisoft Montréal); Deus Ex: Human Revolution (Eidos-Montréal); Might & Magic: Clash of Heroes (Capybara Games); Warhammer 40,000: Space Marine (Relic Entertainment)
Future Shop Gamers' Choice Award	**NHL 12 (EA Canada)**; Assassin's Creed Revelations (Ubisoft Montréal); Deus Ex: Human Revolution (Eidos-Montréal); FIFA 12 (EA Canada)
Innovation Award	**Superbrothers: Sword & Sworcery EP (Capybara Games)**; Battlefield 3 (EA Black Box / DICE); Cows vs. Aliens (XMG Studio); To the Moon (Freebird Games); Warhammer 40,000: Space Marine (Relic Entertainment)

==== CVA 2013 ====
Award	Winner
Game of the Year	**Far Cry 3 (Ubisoft Montréal)**; Assassin's Creed III (Ubisoft Montréal); Mark of the Ninja (Klei Entertainment); Mass Effect 3 (BioWare); Papo & Yo (Minority Media)
Best Console Game	**Mass Effect 3 (BioWare)**; Assassin's Creed III (Ubisoft Montréal); Far Cry 3 (Ubisoft); FIFA 13 (EA Canada); Sleeping Dogs (United Front Games)
Best Downloadable Game	**Mark of the Ninja (Klei Entertainment)**; Incredipede (Northway Games); MechWarrior Online (Piranha Games); Shank 2 (Klei Entertainment); Waveform (Eden Industries)
Best Game on the Go	**Sound Shapes (Queasy Games)**; Baldur's Gate: Enhanced Edition (Beamdog); My Singing Monsters (Big Blue Bubble); Shellrazer (Slick Entertainment); The Bard's Tale (Square One Games)
Best Social/Casual Game	**The Secret World (Funcom Montréal)**; i saw her standing there (krangGAMES); Jurassic Park Builder (Ludia); Marvel Avengers: Battle for Earth (Ubisoft Québec); Rubber Tacos (SAVA Transmedia)
Best Animation	**Far Cry 3 (Ubisoft Montréal)**; Mark of the Ninja (Klei Entertainment); Prototype 2 (Radical Entertainment); Shank 2 (Klei Entertainment); Sleeping Dogs (United Front Games)
Best Audio	**Assassin's Creed III (Ubisoft Montréal)**; Incredipede (Northway Games); Mark of the Ninja (Klei Entertainment); My Singing Monsters (Big Blue Bubble); Sound Shapes (Queasy Games)
Best Game Design	**Far Cry 3 (Ubisoft Montréal)**; Assassin's Creed III (Ubisoft Montréal); Mark of the Ninja (Klei Entertainment); Mass Effect 3 (BioWare); Sound Shapes (Queasy Games)
Best Game Innovation	**Sound Shapes (Queasy Games)**; Far Cry 3 (Ubisoft); Mark of the Ninja (Klei Entertainment); Papo & Yo (Minority Media); Waveform (Eden Industries)
Best Indie Game	**Mark of the Ninja (Klei Entertainment)**; Papo & Yo (Minority Media); Shank 2 (Klei Entertainment); Sound Shapes (Queasy Games); Waveform (Eden Industries)
Best New Character	**Vaas in Far Cry 3 (Ubisoft Montréal)**; The Nun Squad in Nun Attack (Frima Studio); Quico in Papa & Yo (Minority Media); James Heller in Prototype 2 (Radical Entertainment); Wei Shen in Sleeping Dogs (United Front Games)
Best Original Music	**Leaving Earth in Mass Effect 3 (BioWare)**; Main Theme in Assassin's Creed III (Ubisoft Montréal); Liberation in Papo & Yo (Minority Media); Sleeping Dogs Original Score in Sleeping Dogs (United Front Games); Cities in Sound Shapes (Queasy Games)
Best Technology	**Assassin's Creed III (Ubisoft Montréal)**; Mark of the Ninja (Klei Entertainment); MechWarrior Online (Piranha Games); Prototype 2 (Radical Entertainment/Activision); SSX (EA Canada)
Best Visual Arts	**Far Cry 3 (Ubisoft Montréal)**; Assassin's Creed III (Ubisoft Montréal); Incredipede (Northway Games); Mark of the Ninja (Klei Entertainment); Mass Effect 3 (BioWare)
Best Writing	**Mass Effect 3 (BioWare)**; Assassin's Creed III (Ubisoft Montréal); Far Cry 3 (Ubisoft Montréal); Mark of the Ninja (Klei Entertainment); Sleeping Dogs (United Front Games)
Future Shop Fans' Choice Award	**Far Cry 3 (Ubisoft Montréal)**; Assassin's Creed III (Ubisoft Montréal); Batman: Arkham City Armored Edition (WB Games Montréal); Mark of the Ninja (Klei Entertainment); Mass Effect 3 (BioWare); Papo & Yo (Minority Media); Prototype 2 (Radical Entertainment); Sleeping Dogs (United Front Games); Sound Shapes (Queasy Games); Waveform (Eden Industries)

==== CVA 2014 ====
Award	Winner	Year
Game of the Year	**Assassin's Creed IV: Black Flag (Ubisoft Montréal)**; Batman: Arkham Origins (WB Games Montréal); Contrast (Compulsion Games); Dead Rising 3 (Capcom Vancouver); Don't Starve (Klei Entertainment); Far Cry 3: Blood Dragon (Ubisoft Montréal); Guacamelee! (Drinkbox Studios); Luigi’s Mansion: Dark Moon (Next Level Games); Outlast (Red Barrels); Tom Clancy’s Splinter Cell Blacklist (Ubisoft Toronto)	2013
Game of the Year	**Watch Dogs (Ubisoft Montréal)**; Chariot (Frima Studio); Child of Light (Ubisoft Montréal); Company of Heroes 2: The Western Front Armies (Relic Entertainment); Eets Munchies (Klei Entertainment); Hitman GO (Square Enix Montréal); Pixel Garden (Oooweeooo); Super Time Force (Capybara Games); Uncanny X-Men: Days of Future Past (GlitchSoft); Warhammer 40,000: Carnage (Roadhouse Games)	2014
Best Console Game	**Assassin's Creed IV: Black Flag (Ubisoft Montréal)**; Batman: Arkham Origins (WB Games Montréal); Dead Rising 3 (Capcom Vancouver); Far Cry: 3 Blood Dragon (Ubisoft Montréal); Tom Clancy’s Splinter Cell Blacklist (Ubisoft Toronto)	2013
Best Console Game	**Watch Dogs (Ubisoft Montréal)**; Assassin's Creed IV: Black Flag – Freedom Cry (Ubisoft Montréal); Chariot (Frima Studio)	2014
Best Downloadable Game	**Guacamelee! (Drinkbox Studios)**; Contrast (Compulsion Games); Don't Starve (Klei Entertainment); Outlast (Red Barrels); Rogue Legacy (Cellar Door Games)	2013
Best Downloadable Game	**Child of Light (Ubisoft Montréal)**; Always Sometimes Monsters (Vagabond Dog); Company of Heroes 2: The Western Front Armies (Relic Entertainment); Super Time Force (Capybara Games); The Long Dark (Hinterland)	2014
Best Game on the Go	**Luigi’s Mansion: Dark Moon (Next Level Games)**; Fast & Furious 6: The Game (Kabam); Infinite (Nexus Game Studio); Jurassic Park Builder (Ludia); Mighty Bots (East Side Games)	2013
Best Game on the Go	**Skylanders: Trap Team (Beenox)**; Big Action Mega Fight! (Double Stallion); Desert Golfing (Blinkbat Games); Pixel Garden (Oooweeooo); Rival Knights (Gameloft Montréal)	2014
Best iOS Game	**Baldur’s Gate II: Enhanced Edition (Overhaul Games)**; Dungeon Hunter 4 (Gameloft Montréal); Pocket Mine (Roofdog Games); Soul Power (Gabriel Koenig); Super Splatform (P1XL Games)	2013
Best iOS Game	**Hitman GO (Square Enix Montréal)**; Bio Inc. (DryGin Studios); Eets Munchies (Klei Entertainment); Uncanny X-Men: Days of Future Past (GlitchSoft); Warhammer 40,000: Carnage (Roadhouse Games)	2014
Best Social/Casual Game	**UNO & Friends (Gameloft Montréal)**; MLB Ballpark Empire (MLB Advanced Media); EGGNOGG+ (Madgarden); Monster Loves You! (Radical Games); TraceRace (Spaddlewit)	2013
Best Social/Casual Game	**i saw her across the world (krangGAMES)**; Blokus (Gameloft Montréal); Dragons: Rise of Berk (Ludia); Lego City My City (Hibernum Créations); Shu’s Garden (Colin Sanders and Jay Bond)	2014
Best Animation	**Batman: Arkham Origins (WB Games Montréal)**; Assassin's Creed IV: Black Flag (Ubisoft Montréal); Dead Rising 3 (Capcom Vancouver); Don't Starve (Klei Entertainment); Tom Clancy’s Splinter Cell: Blacklist (Ubisoft Toronto)	2013
Best Animation	**Child of Light (Ubisoft Montréal)**; Chariot (Frima Studio); Company of Heroes 2: The Western Front Armies (Relic Entertainment); Hitman GO (Square Enix Montréal); Watch Dogs (Ubisoft Montréal)	2014
Best Audio	**Far Cry 3: Blood Dragon (Ubisoft Montréal)**; Assassin's Creed IV: Black Flag (Ubisoft Montréal); Batman: Arkham Origins (WB Games Montréal); Dead Rising 3 (Capcom Vancouver); Luigi’s Mansion: Dark Moon (Next Level Games)	2013
Best Audio	**Assassin's Creed IV: Black Flag – Freedom Cry (Ubisoft Québec)**; Child of Light (Ubisoft Montréal); Company of Heroes 2: The Western Front Armies (Relic Entertainment); Skylanders: Trap Team (Beenox); Warhammer 40,000: Carnage (Roadhouse Games)	2014
Best Game Design	**Assassin's Creed IV: Black Flag (Ubisoft Montréal)**; Batman: Arkham Origins (WB Games Montréal); Dead Rising 3 (Capcom Vancouver); Don't Starve (Klei Entertainment); Guacamelee! (Drinkbox Studios)	2013
Best Game Design	**Hitman GO (Square Enix Montréal)**; Chariot (Frima Studio); Skylanders: Trap Team (Beenox); The Long Dark (Hinterland); Watch Dogs (Ubisoft Montréal)	2014
Best Game Innovation	**Contrast (Compulsion Games)**; Assassin's Creed IV: Black Flag (Ubisoft Montréal); Contrast (Compulsion Games); Dead Rising 3 (Capcom Vancouver); Guacamelee! (Drinkbox Studios); Infinite (Nexus Game Studio)	2013
Best Game Innovation	**Super Time Force (Capybara Games)**; Hitman GO (Square Enix Montréal); i saw her across the world (krangGAMES); The Long Dark (Hinterland); Watch Dogs (Ubisoft Montréal)	2014
Best Indie Game	**Guacamelee!** **(Drinkbox Studios)**; Contrast (Compulsion Games); Don't Starve (Klei Entertainment); Infinite (Nexus Game Studio); MacGuffin Quest (Pixel Crucible); Outlast (Red Barrels); Pocket Mine (Roofdog Games); Rogue Legacy (Cellar Door Games); Sang-Froid: Tales of Werewolves (Artifice Studio); Super Stickman Golf 2 (Noodlecake Games)	2013
Best Indie Game	**Always Sometimes Monsters (Vagabond Dog)**; Bio Inc. (DryGin Studios); Glitchhikers (Silverstring Media); i saw her across the world (krangGAMES); Mercenary Kings (Tribute Games); Super Time Force (Capybara Games); The Fall (Over the Moon Games); The Long Dark (Hinterland); The Veil (Wayward); Uncanny X-Men: Days of Future Past (GlitchSoft)	2014
Best New Character	**Edward Kenway in Assassin's Creed IV: Black Flag (Ubisoft Montréal)**; Didi Malenkaya in Contrast (Compulsion Games); Nick Ramos in Dead Rising 3 (Capcom Vancouver); Wilson in Don't Starve (Klei Entertainment); Juan Aguacate in Guacamelee! (Drinkbox Studios)	2013
Best New Character	**Aurora in Child of Light (Ubisoft Montréal)**; Adewale in Assassin's Creed IV: Black Flag – Freedom Cry (Ubisoft Montréal); The Princess in Chariot (Frima Studio); Lob-Star in Skylanders: Trap Team (Beenox); Aiden Pearce in Watch Dogs (Ubisoft Montréal)	2014
Best Original Music	**Power Core by Power Glove in Far Cry 3: Blood Dragon (Ubisoft Montréal)**; Assassin's Creed IV: Black Flag Main Theme in Assassin's Creed IV: Black Flag (Ubisoft Montréal); Arkham Origins Main Titles in Batman: Arkham Origins (WB Games Montréal); House on Fire in Contrast (Compulsion Games); Dark Moon in Luigi’s Mansion: Dark Moon (Next Level Games)	2013
Best Original Music	**Aurora's Theme in Child of Light (Ubisoft Montréal)**; Pet Rock Meets the Moon in Always Sometimes Monsters (Vagabond Dog); The Fight for All in Assassin's Creed IV: Black Flag – Freedom Cry (Ubisoft Montréal); Main Theme in Company of Heroes 2: The Western Front Armies (Relic Entertainment); The Mountain in i saw her across the world (krangGAMES)	2014
Best Technology	**Dead Rising 3 (Capcom Vancouver)**; Assassin's Creed IV: Black Flag (Ubisoft Montréal); Bungee Pigs (InLight Entertainment); Contrast (Compulsion Games); Warframe (Digital Extremes)	2013
Best Technology	**Watch Dogs (Ubisoft Montréal)**; Bio Inc. (DryGin Studios); Chariot (Frima Studio); Company of Heroes 2: The Western From Armies (Relic Entertainment); Super Time Force (Capybara Games)	2014
Best Visual Arts	**Batman: Arkham Origins (WB Games Montréal)**; Assassin's Creed IV: Black Flag (Ubisoft Montréal); Contrast (Compulsion Games); Don't Starve (Klei Entertainment); Guacamelee! (Drinkbox Studios)	2013
Best Visual Arts	**Child of Light (Ubisoft Montréal)**; Chariot (Frima Studio); Hitman GO (Square Enix Montréal); The Long Dark (Hinterland); Watch Dogs (Ubisoft Montréal)	2014
Best Writing	**Assassin's Creed IV: Black Flag (Ubisoft Montréal)**; Batman: Arkham Origins (WB Games Montréal); Contrast (Compulsion Games); Dead Rising 3 (Capcom Vancouver); Far Cry 3: Blood Dragon (Ubisoft Montréal)	2013
Best Writing	**Always Sometimes Monsters (Vagabond Dog)**; Assassin's Creed IV: Black Flag – Freedom Cry (Ubisoft Montréal); Child of Light (Ubisoft Montréal); i saw her across the world (krangGAMES)	2014
Fans' Choice Award	**Outlast (Red Barrels)**; Assassin's Creed IV: Black Flag (Ubisoft Montréal); Batman: Arkham Origins (WB Games Montréal); Contrast (Compulsion Games); Dead Rising 3 (Capcom Vancouver); Don't Starve (Klei Entertainment); Far Cry 3: Blood Dragon (Ubisoft Montréal); Guacamelee! (Drinkbox Studios); Luigi’s Mansion: Dark Moon (Next Level Games); Tom Clancy’s Splinter Cell Blacklist (Ubisoft Toronto)	2013
Fans' Choice Award	**Dragons: Rise of Berk (Ludia)**; Assassin's Creed IV: Black Flag – Freedom Cry (Ubisoft Montréal); Chariot (Frima Studio); Child of Light (Ubisoft Montréal); Hitman GO (Square Enix Montréal); Shattered Planet (Kitfox Games); Super Time Force (Capybara Games); Uncanny X-Men: Days of Future Past (GlitchSoft); Warhammer 40,000: Carnage (Roadhouse Games); Watch Dogs (Ubisoft Montréal)	2014

==== CVA 2015 ====
Award	Winner
Game of the Year	**Assassin's Creed Syndicate (Ubisoft Québec)**; Alto’s Adventure (Team Alto); Apotheon (Alientrap); Bruce Lee: Enter the Game (Hibernum Créations); Cryptark (Alientrap); Far Cry 4 (Ubisoft Montréal); Invisible, Inc. (Klei Entertainment); Lara Croft GO (Square Enix Montréal); Super Mega Baseball (Metalhead Software); Runbow (13AM Games)
Fans' Choice: Best Canadian-Made Game	**N++ (Metanet Software)**; Apotheon (Alientrap); Assassin's Creed Syndicate (Ubisoft Québec); Assassin's Creed Unity (Ubisoft Montréal); Don't Starve: Giant Edition (Klei Entertainment); Dragon Age: Inquisition (BioWare); Far Cry 4 (Ubisoft Montréal); Hitman: Sniper (Square Enix Montréal); Lara Croft GO (Square Enix Montréal); Last Voyage (Semidome)
Fans' Choice: Best International Game	**The Witcher 3: Wild Hunt (CD Projekt Red)**; Batman: Arkham Knight (Rocksteady Studios); Bloodborne (FromSoftware); Fallout 4 (Bethesda Game Studios); Halo 5: Guardians (343 Industries); Metal Gear Solid V: The Phantom Pain (Kojima Productions); Ori and the Blind Forest (Moon Studios); Rise of the Tomb Raider (Crystal Dynamics); Rocket League (Psyonix); Super Mario Maker (Nintendo EAD)
Best Console Game	**Dragon Age: Inquisition (BioWare)**; Assassin's Creed Syndicate (Ubisoft Québec); Don't Starve: Giant Edition (Klei Entertainment); Far Cry 4 (Ubisoft Montréal); FIFA 16 (EA Canada)
Best Downloadable Game	**Invisible, Inc. (Klei Entertainment)**; Apotheon (Alientrap); N++ (Metanet Software); Runbow (13AM Games); The Castle Game (Neptune Interactive)
Best Game on the Go	**Skylanders SuperChargers Racing (Beenox)**; Bruce Lee: Enter the Game (Hibernum Créations); Marvel Contest of Champions (Kabam); Siegefall (Gameloft Montréal); The Walking Dead: Road to Survival (IUGO Mobile Entertainment); Dungeon Hunter 5 (Gameloft Montréal); Jurassic World: The Game (Ludia)
Best iOS Game	**Lara Croft GO (Square Enix Montréal)**; Alto’s Adventure (Snowman); Don't Starve: Pocket Edition (Klei Entertainment); Hitman: Sniper (Square Enix Montréal); Oddworld: Stranger’s Wrath (Square One Games)
Best Social/Casual Game	**I Love Potatoes (Vali Fugulin / Ruben Farrus / Minority)**; Bean Boy (Tyson Ibele); Crusaders of the Lost Idols (Codename Entertainment); Cupkins (Joydrop); Waldo & Friends (Ludia)
Best Animation	**Assassin's Creed Syndicate (Ubisoft Québec)**; Apotheon (Alientrap); Dragon Age: Inquisition (BioWare); Far Cry 4 (Ubisoft Montréal); Lara Croft GO (Square Enix Montréal)
Best Audio	**Assassin's Creed Syndicate (Ubisoft Québec)**; Apotheon (Alientrap); Assassin's Creed Unity (Ubisoft Montréal); Lara Croft GO (Square Enix Montréal); Dragon Age: Inquisition (BioWare)
Best Game Design	**Far Cry 4 (Ubisoft Montréal)**; Assassin's Creed Syndicate (Ubisoft Québec); Lara Croft GO (Square Enix Montréal); Last Voyage (Semidome); TowerFall Dark World (Maddy Thorson)
Best Game Innovation	**Pulse (Pixel Pi Games)**; Clandestine: Anomaly (ZenFri); Don't Starve: Giant Edition (Klei Entertainment); Lamper VR: Firefly Rescue (Archiact Interactive); Last Voyage (Semidome)
Best Indie Game	**Invisible, Inc. (Klei Entertainment)**; Alpha Quest (Rikkir); Alto’s Adventure (Team Alto); Apotheon (Alientrap); Don't Starve: Giant Edition (Klei Entertainment); Last Voyage (Semidome); Lastronaut (Darrin Henein & Stephan Leroux); LOST ORBIT (PixelNAUTS Games); Planet of the Eyes (Cococucumber); ROCKETSROCKETSROCKETS (Radial Games)
Best New Character	**Jacob and Evie Frye in Assassin's Creed Syndicate (Ubisoft Québec)**; Armillo in Armillo (Fuzzy Wuzzy Games); Arno Dorian in Assassin's Creed Unity (Ubisoft Montréal); Pagan Min in Far Cry 4 (Ubisoft Montréal); Olivia "Central" Gladstone in Invisible, Inc. (Klei Entertainment)
Best Original Music	**D.R Style (Vinyl) in Don't Starve: Pocket Edition (Klei Entertainment)**; King of the Gods in Apotheon (Alientrap); Rose's Theme in Forgotten Memories: Alternate Realities (Psychose Interactive); Defender of Kothal in Star Wars Rebels: Recon Missions (Gigataur); The Castle Game Theme in The Castle Game (Neptune Interactive)
Best Technology	**Hitman: Sniper (Square Enix Montréal)**; Apotheon (Alientrap); Clandestine: Anomaly (ZenFri); Fruit Ninja Kinect 2 (Hibernum Créations); Lamper VR: Firefly Rescue (Archiact Interactive)
Best Visual Arts	**Assassin's Creed Syndicate (Ubisoft Québec)**; Dragon Age: Inquisition (BioWare); Far Cry 4 (Ubisoft Montréal); Lara Croft GO (Square Enix Montréal); Last Voyage (Semidome)
Best Writing	**Dragon Age: Inquisition (BioWare)**; Assassin's Creed Syndicate (Ubisoft Québec); Assassin's Creed Unity (Ubisoft Montréal); Invisible, Inc. (Klei Entertainment)

==== CVA 2016 ====
Award	Winner
Game of the Year	**Deus Ex: Mankind Divided (Eidos-Montréal)**; Dead by Daylight (Behaviour Digital); Deus Ex GO (Square Enix Montréal); Eagle Flight (Ubisoft Montréal); Far Cry Primal (Ubisoft Montréal); NHL 17 (EA Canada); Severed (Drinkbox Studios); Stories: The Path of Destinies (Spearhead Games); The Gallery – Episode 1: Call of the Starseed (Cloudhead Games); Tom Clancy’s Rainbow Six Siege (Ubisoft Montréal)
Fans' Choice: Best International Game	**Rise of the Tomb Raider (Crystal Dynamics)**; Battlefield 1 (DICE); Dark Souls III (FromSoftware); Doom (id Software); Inside (Playdead); Overwatch (Blizzard Entertainment); Sid Meier’s Civilization VI (Firaxis Games); The Witness (Thekla); Uncharted 4: A Thief’s End (Naughty Dog); XCOM 2 (Firaxis Games)
Fans' Choice: Best Canadian-Made Game	**Dead by Daylight (Behaviour Digital)**; Alone With You (Benjamin Rivers); Deus Ex GO (Square Enix Montréal); Deus Ex: Mankind Divided (Eidos-Montréal); FIFA 17 (EA Canada); Jotun: Valhalla Edition (Thunder Lotus Games); NHL 17 (EA Canada); Severed (Drinkbox Studios); Stories: The Path of Destinies (Spearhead Games); The Gallery – Episode 1: Call of the Starseed (Cloudhead Games)
Best Console Game	**Deus Ex: Mankind Divided (Eidos-Montréal)**; Far Cry Primal (Ubisoft Montréal); Jotun: Valhalla Edition (Thunder Lotus Games); NHL 17 (EA Canada); Tom Clancy’s Rainbow Six Siege (Ubisoft Montréal)
Best Mobile/Handheld Game	**Severed (Drinkbox Studios)**; Alone With You (Benjamin Rivers); Deus Ex GO (Square Enix Montréal); Leap of Fate (Clever Plays); LOUD on Planet X (Pop Sandbox)
Best PC Game	**Stories: The Path of Destinies (Spearhead Games)**; Dead by Daylight (Behaviour Digital); Death Road to Canada (Madgarden); Halcyon 6: Starbase Commander (Massive Damage); Moon Hunters (Kitfox Games)
Best Virtual Reality Game	**The Gallery – Episode 1: Call of the Starseed (Cloudhead Games)**; Eagle Flight (Ubisoft Montréal); Keep Talking and Nobody Explodes (Steel Crate Games); Modbox (Alientrap); Waddle Home (Archiact Interactive)
Best Animation	**Far Cry Primal (Ubisoft Montréal)**; Deus Ex GO (Square Enix Montréal); NHL 17 (EA Canada); Tom Clancy’s Rainbow Six Siege (Ubisoft Montréal); UFC 2 (EA Canada)
Best Art Direction	**Jotun: Valhalla Edition (Thunder Lotus Games)**; Deus Ex GO (Square Enix Montréal); Deus Ex: Mankind Divided (Eidos-Montréal); Eagle Flight (Ubisoft Montréal); Jotun: Valhalla Edition (Thunder Lotus Games); Severed (Drinkbox Studios)
Best Audio	**NHL 17 (EA Canada)**; Deus Ex GO (Square Enix Montréal); Deus Ex: Mankind Divided (Eidos-Montréal); Far Cry Primal (Ubisoft Montréal); The Gallery – Episode 1: Call of the Starseed (Cloudhead Games)
Best Debut Game	**Jotun: Valhalla Edition (Thunder Lotus Games)**; Friday Night Bullet Arena (Red Nexus Games); Jotun: Valhalla Edition (Thunder Lotus Games); Leap of Fate (Clever Plays); Oz: Broken Kingdom (This Game Studio); The Gallery – Episode 1: Call of the Starseed (Cloudhead Games)
Best Educational Game	**Modbox (Alientrap)**; Porta-Pilots: Plunging Through Time (Hibernum Créations); Scattergories (Magmic)
Best Game Design	**Deus Ex: Mankind Divided (Eidos-Montréal)**; Eagle Flight (Ubisoft Montréal); NHL 17 (EA Canada); Tom Clancy’s Rainbow Six Siege (Ubisoft Montréal); Ultimate Chicken Horse (Clever Endeavour Games)
Best Game Innovation	**The Gallery – Episode 1: Call of the Starseed (Cloudhead Games)**; Deus Ex GO (Square Enix Montréal); Eagle Flight (Ubisoft Montréal); Modbox (Alientrap); Ultimate Chicken Horse (Clever Endeavour Games)
Best Indie Game	**Stories: The Path of Destinies (Spearhead Games)**; Alone With You (Benjamin Rivers); Jotun: Valhalla Edition (Thunder Lotus Games); Severed (Drinkbox Studios); The Gallery – Episode 1: Call of the Starseed (Cloudhead Games)
Best Musical Score	**Take My Hand by YAMANTAKA // SONIC TITAN & Pantayo in Severed (Drinkbox Studios)**; Alone With You (Benjamin Rivers); Dead by Daylight (Behaviour Digital); Deus Ex GO (Square Enix Montréal); Deus Ex: Mankind Divided (Eidos-Montréal)
Best Narrative	**Deus Ex: Mankind Divided (Eidos-Montréal)**; Alone With You (Benjamin Rivers); FIFA 17 (EA Canada); Moon Hunters (Kitfox Games); Severed (Drinkbox Studios)
Best New Character	**The Trapper in Dead by Daylight (Behaviour Digital)**; Thora in Jotun: Valhalla Edition (Thunder Lotus Games); Mukai in Leap of Fate (Clever Plays); Sasha in Severed (Drinkbox Studios); Reynardo in Stories: The Path of Destinies (Spearhead Games)
Best Performance	**Deus Ex: Mankind Divided (Eidos-Montréal)**; OK K.O.! Lakewood Plaza Turbo (Double Stallion Games); Porta-Pilots: Plunging Through Time (Hibernum Créations); Tappy Toes (Rikkir); The Gallery – Episode 1: Call of the Starseed (Cloudhead Games)
Best Technology	**The Gallery – Episode 1: Call of the Starseed (Cloudhead Games)**; Deus Ex: Mankind Divided (Eidos-Montréal); Eagle Flight (Ubisoft Montréal); Modbox (Alientrap); Tom Clancy’s Rainbow Six Siege (Ubisoft Montréal)

=== Canadian Game Awards ===
==== CGA 2020 ====
Award	Winner
Game of the Year	**Cadence of Hyrule (Brace Yourself Games)**; Far Cry New Dawn (Ubisoft Montréal); Pistol Whip (Cloudhead Games); Gears 5 (The Coalition); Luigi's Mansion 3 (Next Level Games)
Studio of the Year	**Klei Entertainment**; Digital Extremes; The Coalition; Behaviour Interactive
Best Art Direction	**Dauntless (Phoenix Labs)**; Candence of Hyrule (Brace Yourself Games); Far Cry New Dawn (Ubisoft Montréal); Gears 5 (The Coalition); Luigi's Mansion 3 (Next Level Games)
Best Narrative	**MechWarrior 5: Mercenaries (Piranha Games)**; Gears 5 (The Coalition); Far Cry New Dawn (Ubisoft Montréal); Candence of Hyrule (Brace Yourself Games); Luigi's Mansion 3 (Next Level Games)
Best Game Design	**Cadence of Hyrule (Brace Yourself Games)**; Oxygen Not Included (Klei Entertainment); Gears 5 (The Coalition); Luigi's Mansion 3 (Next Level Games); Hot Lava (Klei Entertainment)
Best Performance	**Leslie Miller as Lou in Far Cry New Dawn (Ubisoft Montréal)**; Laura Bailey as Kait Diaz in Gears 5 (The Coalition); Liam Mcintyre as JD Fenix in Gears 5 (The Coalition); Greg Bryk as Joseph Seed in Far Cry New Dawn (Ubisoft Montréal); Cara Ricketts as Mickey in Far Cry New Dawn (Ubisoft Montréal)
Best Score/Soundtrack	**Outward (Nine Dots Studio)**; Cadence of Hyrule (Brace Yourself Games); Luigi's Mansion 3 (Next Level Games); Gears 5 (The Coalition); Grindstone (Capybara Games)
Best Audio Design	**Far Cry New Dawn (Ubisoft Montréal)**; Candence of Hyrule (Brace Yourself Games); Pistol Whip (Cloudhead Games); Luigi's Mansion 3 (Next Level Games); Gears 5 (The Coalition)
Best Indie Game	**Cadence of Hyrule (Brace Yourself Games)**; Spek (RAC7 Games); Grindstone (Capybara Games); Oxygen Not Included (Klei Entertainment); Pistol Whip (Cloudhead Games)
Best PC Game	**Far Cry New Dawn (Ubisoft Montréal)**; Gears 5 (The Coalition); Oxygen Not Included (Klei Entertainment); Dauntless (Phoenix Labs); Ancestors: The Humankind Odyssey (Panache Digital)
Best Console Game	**Cadence of Hyrule (Brace Yourself Games)**; Luigi's Mansion 3 (Next Level Games); Crash Team Racing Nitro-Fueled (Beenox); Dauntless (Phoenix Labs); Gears 5 (The Coalition)
Best Mobile Game	**Pixelings (Outerminds)**; Hot Lava (Klei Entertainment); Overdrive City (Gameloft Montréal); Sneaky Sasquatch (RAC7 Games); Grindstone (Capybara Games)
Best Esports Player	**Russel "Twistizz" Van Dulken (Team Liquid)**; Philippe "Vulcan" Laflamme (Cloud9); Williams "Zayt" Aubin (NRG); Artour "Arteezy" Babaev (Evil Geniuses); Troy "Canadian" Jaroslawski (Spacestation Gaming)
Best Esports Host	**Marissa "MRob" Roberto (TSN)**; Brody "Liefx" Moore; Isaac "Azael" Cummings-Bentley; Matthew "Sadokist" Trivett; Parker "Interro" Mackay
Best Esports Organization	**Toronto Defiant (OverActive Media)**; Team Reciprocity; Toronto Ultra; Luminosity Gaming; Vancouver Titans
Best Esports Event	**Get On My Level 2019 (Even Matchup Gaming)**; Six Invitational 2019; EGLX 2019; DreamHack Montreal 2019; Red Bull AdrenaLAN 2019
Best Content Creator / Show	**DangerouslyFunny**; Denis Talbot; Steve Saylor; Squad; The Score Esports
Best Streamer	**Alicia "EightBitBlonde" Alexandra**; Imane "Pokimane" Anys; Stephanie "missharvey" Harvey; Félix "xQc" Lengyel; Michael "Shroud" Grzesiek
Best Personality	**Cherry Thompson**; Jade Raymond; Pixelles; Geoff Keighley

==== CGA 2021 ====
Award	Winner
Game of the Year	**Assassin's Creed Valhalla (Ubisoft Montréal)**; Hardspace: Shipbreaker (Blackbird Interactive); Spiritfarer (Thunder Lotus); Star Wars: Squadrons (Motive Studio); Watch Dogs: Legion (Ubisoft Toronto)
Studio of the Year	**Certain Affinity Toronto**; Motive Studio; Phoenix Labs; The Coalition; Thunder Lotus
Fans' Choice Award	**Hardspace: Shipbreaker (Blackbird Interactive)**; A Fold Apart (Lightning Rod Games); Call of Duty: Modern Warfare 2 Campaign Remastered (Beenox); Mad Experiments: Escape Room (PlayTogether Studio); Speed Dating for Ghosts (Copychaser Games)
Best Art Direction	**Spiritfarer (Thunder Lotus)**; A Fold Apart (Lightning Rod Games); Assassin's Creed Valhalla (Ubisoft Montréal); Boreal Tenebrae (Snot Bubbles Productions); Spinch (Queen Bee Games)
Best Narrative	**Assassin's Creed Valhalla (Ubisoft Montréal)**; A Fold Apart (Lightning Rod Games); Boreal Tenebrae (Snot Bubbles Productions); Immortals Fenyx Rising (Ubisoft Québec); Spiritfarer (Thunder Lotus)
Best Game Design	**Hardspace: Shipbreaker (Blackbird Interactive)**; Gears Tactics (The Coalition / Splash Damage); Lucifer Within Us (Kitfox Games); Star Wars: Squadrons (Motive Studio); Watch Dogs: Legion (Ubisoft Toronto)
Best Performance	**Cecilie Stenspil as Eivor in Assassin's Creed Valhalla (Ubisoft Montréal)**; Guillaume Lambert as the Announcer in Journey to the Savage Planet (Typhoon Studios); Pascal Langdale as Bagley in Watch Dogs: Legion (Ubisoft Toronto); Katherine Levac as E.K.O. in Journey to the Savage Planet (Typhoon Studios); Elana Dunkelman as Fenyx in Immortals Fenyx Rising (Ubisoft Québec)
Best Score/Soundtrack	**Spiritfarer (Thunder Lotus)**; A Fold Apart (Lightning Rod Games); Assassin's Creed Valhalla (Ubisoft Montréal); Hardspace: Shipbreaker (Blackbird Interactive); Immortals Fenyx Rising (Ubisoft Québec)
Best Audio Design	**Star Wars: Squadrons (Motive Studio)**; Assassin's Creed Valhalla (Ubisoft Montréal); Dauntless (Phoenix Labs); Hardspace: Shipbreaker (Blackbird Interactive); Watch Dogs: Legion (Ubisoft Toronto)
Best Indie Game	**Spiritfarer (Thunder Lotus)**; A Fold Apart (Lightning Rod Games); Bloodroots (Paper Cult); Journey to the Savage Planet (Typhoon Studios); Star Renegades (Massive Damage)
Best Debut Indie Game	**Journey to the Savage Planet (Typhoon Studios)**; A Fold Apart (Lightning Rod Games); Bloodroots (Paper Cult); Ikenfell (Happy Ray Games); UnderMine (Thorium)
Best VR/AR Game	**Star Wars: Squadrons (Motive Studio)**; Groove Gunner (BitCutter Studios); Slugterra VR (Dark Slope Studios); Transformers: VR Battle Arena (Meta4 Interactive); Vetrix (Pixel Racers)
Best PC Game	**Assassin's Creed Valhalla (Ubisoft Montréal)**; Hardspace: Shipbreaker (Blackbird Interactive); Industries of Titan (Brace Yourself Games); Star Wars: Squadrons (Motive Studio); Watch Dogs: Legion (Ubisoft Toronto)
Best Console Game	**Assassin's Creed Valhalla (Ubisoft Montréal)**; A Short Hike (Adam Robinson-Yu); Immortals Fenyx Rising (Ubisoft Québec); Spiritfarer (Thunder Lotus); Watch Dogs: Legion (Ubisoft Toronto)
Best Mobile Game	**A Fold Apart (Lightning Rod Games)**; Archer: Danger Phone (East Side Games); Marvel Realm of Champions (Kabam); Shop Titans (Kabam); Winding Worlds (KO_OP)
Best Esports Player	**Indervir "iLLeY" Dhaliwal in the Call of Duty League**; Artour “Arteezy” Babaev in Dota 2; Josh “Steel” Nissan in Valorant; Michael “Miviens” Viens in NHL; Sasha “Scarlett” Hostyn in StarCraft II
Best Esports Host	**Camille "Camco" Salazar-Hadaway**; Alexander “The Shyway” Hope; Alex “Vansilli” Nguyen; Brody “Liefx” Moore; Jennifer “LemonKiwi” Pichette
Best Esports Organization	**Luminosity Gaming**; Eleven Gaming; Mirage Esports; OverActive Media; Raptors Uprising GC
Best Esports Event	**Six Invitational 2020 (Ubisoft)**; AdrenaLAN 2020; Get On My Line 2020; NHL 20 CUP; Toronto Ultra 100K Payout
Best Esports Coach	**Joshua "Jatt" Leesman**; Aaron “Clairvoyance” Kim; Dylan “Didz” Didiano; Dylan Falco; Raymond “Rambo” Lussier
Best Content Creator / Show	**Linus Sebastian (Linus Tech Tips)**; Autumn Rhodes; James Ronald (Epic Game Music); Ryan Letourneau (Northernlion)
Best Streamer	**Michael "Shroud" Grzesiek**; Eren “Caboose” Kose; Jeremy “Disguised Toast” Wang; Kate Stark; Stephanie “missharvey” Harvey
Best Personality	**Imane "Pokimane" Anys**; Geoff Keighley; Kristen “KittyPlays” Michaela; Naomi Kyle; Steve Saylor

==== CGA 2022 ====
Award	Winner
Game of the Year	**Marvel's Guardians of the Galaxy (Eidos-Montréal)**; Boyfriend Dungeon (Kitfox Games); Echo Generation (Cococucumber); Far Cry 6 (Ubisoft Toronto); FIFA 22 (EA Vancouver)
Studio of the Year	**Ubisoft Toronto**; EA Vancouver; Motive Studio; Relic Entertainment; Ubisoft Montréal
Best Art Direction	**Wytchwood (Alientrap)**; Age of Empires IV (Relic Entertainment); Clan O’Conall and the Crown of the Stag (HitGrab); Far Cry 6 (Ubisoft Toronto); Winds & Leaves (TREBUCHET Studios)
Best Narrative	**Marvel's Guardians of the Galaxy (Eidos-Montréal)**; Boyfriend Dungeon (Kitfox Games); Echo Generation (Cococucumber); Moonglow Bay (Bunnyhug); Wytchwood (Alientrap)
Best Game Design	**Inscryption (Daniel Mullins Games)**; Far Cry 6 (Ubisoft Toronto); LEGO Star Wars: Castaways (Gameloft Montréal); Marvel’s Guardians of the Galaxy (Eidos-Montréal); Moonglow Bay (Bunnyhug)
Best Performance	**Giancarlo Esposito as Anton Castillo in Far Cry 6 (Ubisoft Toronto)**; Alex Weiner as Rocket in Marvel’s Guardians of the Galaxy (Eidos-Montréal); Dominic Monaghan in Dark Threads (Be Curious Productions / Cream Digital); Jack Black as the Mote of Light in Psychonauts 2 (Double Fine); Jon McLaren as Star-Lord in Marvel’s Guardians of the Galaxy (Eidos-Montréal)
Best Score/Soundtrack	**Age of Empires IV (Relic Entertainment)**; Assassin's Creed Valhalla: Discovery Tour – Viking Age (Ubisoft Montréal); Echo Generation (Cococucumber); Marvel’s Guardians of the Galaxy (Eidos-Montréal); The Big Con (Mighty Yell Studios)
Best Audio Design	**The Vale: Shadow of the Crown (Falling Squirrel)**; Age of Empires IV (Relic Entertainment); Chivalry 2 (Torn Banner Studios); Echo Generation (Cococucumber); LEGO Star Wars: Castaways (Gameloft Montréal)
Best Indie Game	**Echo Generation (Cococucumber)**; Boyfriend Dungeon (Kitfox Games); Chicory: A Colorful Tale (Greg Lobanov); Moonglow Bay (Bunnyhug); The Big Con (Mighty Yell Studios)
Best VR/AR Game	**Pistol Whip: Smoke & Thunder (Cloudhead Games)**; Arcadia.tv (Arcadia Game Works); Dark Threads (Be Curious Productions / Cream Digital); Doom 3: VR Edition (Archiact Interactive); Winds & Leaves (TREBUCHET Studios)
Best PC Game	**Age of Empires IV (Relic Entertainment)**; Assassin's Creed Valhalla: Discovery Tour – Viking Age (Ubisoft Montréal); Inscryption (Daniel Mullins Games); Marvel’s Guardians of the Galaxy (Eidos-Montréal); Mass Effect Legendary Edition (BioWare)
Best Console Game	**Marvel's Guardians of the Galaxy (Eidos-Montréal)**; Assassin's Creed Valhalla: Discovery Tour – Viking Age (Ubisoft Montréal); Echo Generation (Cococucumber); Far Cry 6 (Ubisoft Toronto); FIFA 22 (EA Vancouver)
Best Mobile Game	**LEGO Star Wars: Castaways (Gameloft Montréal)**; Big NEON Tower VS Tiny Square (Evil Objective); Goose Goose Duck (Gaggle Studios); Grindstone (Capybara Games); Hotel Hermes (Adjective Noun Studios); RuPaul’s Drag Race Superstar (East Side Games)
Best Esports Player	**Russel "Twistzz" Van Dulken (FaZe Clan)**; Alex “scuwry” Scala (Kungarna NA); Jasmine “Jazzyk1ns” Manankil (MAJKL); Mirna “athxna” Noureldin (TSM X); Tyson “TenZ” Ngo (Sentinels)
Best Esports Host	**Parker "Interro" Mackay**; Alex “Vansilli” Nguyen; Brody “Liefx” Moore; Camille “Camco” Salazar-Hadaway; Conner “Scrawny” Girvan
Best Esports Organization	**Luminosity Gaming**; Lazarus Esports; Mirage Esports; OverActive Media; Parabellum Esports
Best Esports Event	**Red Bull Campus Clutch 2021 – Canadian National Final (Red Bull)**; Bell Esports Challenge 2021; Get On My Line 2021; Toronto Ultra 100K Canada Cup; Pinnacle 2021
Best Esports Coach	**Raymond "Rambo" Lussier**; Gabriel “Invert” Zoltan-Johan; Joshua “Jatt” Leesman; Kyle “OCEAN” O’Brien; Thomas “Trippy” Schappy
Best Content Creator / Show	**Evan Fong (VanossGaming)**; Andre Rebelo (Typical Gamer); Autumn Rhodes; HappyConsoleGamer; Nick Amyoony
Best Streamer	**Imane "Pokimane" Anys**; Danny “Shiphtur” Le; Félix “xQc” Lengyel; Jeremy “Disguised Toast” Wang; Michael “Shroud” Grzesiek
Best Personality	**Stephanie "missharvey" Harvey**; Autumn Rhodes; Camille “Camco” Salazar-Hadaway; Imane “Pokimane” Anys; Jeremy “Disguised Toast” Wang

==== CGA 2023 ====
Nomination Category	Award	Winner
Year Accolade	Game of the Year	**Tunic (TUNIC Team / ISOMETRICORP Games)**; Warhammer 40000: Chaos Gate – Daemonhunters (Complex Games); Disney Dreamlight Valley (Gameloft Montréal); Nobody Saves the World (Drinkbox Studios); Rogue Legacy 2 (Cellar Door Games)
Year Accolade	Studio of the Year	**TUNIC Team / ISOMETRICORP Games**; Complex Games; Drinkbox Studios; Gameloft Montréal; Behavior Interactive
Year Accolade	Best Console Game	**Tunic (TUNIC Team / ISOMETRICORP Games)**; Disney Dreamlight Valley (Gameloft Montréal); Rainbow Six Extraction (Ubisoft Montréal); Nobody Saves the World (Drinkbox Studios); Rogue Legacy 2 (Cellar Door Games)
Year Accolade	Best Mobile Game	**Disney Mirrorverse (Kabam)**; Knotwords (Noodlecake Studios); INKS (Noodlecake Studios); Lingo Legend Language Learning (Hyperthought Games); Yeager: Hunter Legend (IGG)
Year Accolade	Best PC Game	**Tunic (TUNIC Team / ISOMETRICORP Games)**; Warhammer 40000: Chaos Gate – Daemonhunters (Complex Games); Nobody Saves the World (Drinkbox Studios); Roller Champions (Ubisoft Montréal); Rainbow Six Extraction (Ubisoft Montréal)
Year Accolade	Best VR/AR Game	**Broken Edge (Trebuchet)**; Swordsman VR (Sinn Studio); Transformers Beyond Reality (Meta4 Interactive); Nerf Ultimate Championship (Secret Location); Terrorarium (Games by Stitch)
Year Accolade	Community Awards	**Kurston Timothy (MYNNO)**
Developers	Best Art Direction	**Cuphead: The Delicious Last Course (Studio MDHR)**; Nobody Saves the World (Drinkbox Studios); Gotham Knights (WB Games Montréal); Mario Strikers: Battle League (Next Level Games); I Was a Teenage Exocolonist (Northway Games)
Developers	Best Narrative	**I was a Teenage Exocolonist (Northway Games)**; Gotham Knights (WB Games Montréal); Hardspace: Shipbreaker (Blackbird Interactive); Glitchhikers: The Spaces Between (Silverstring Media); The Chant (Brass Token)
Developers	Best Game Design	**Tunic (TUNIC Team / ISOMETRICORP Games)**; Nobody Saves The World (Drinkbox Studios); Tom Clancy's Rainbow Six Extraction (Ubisoft Montréal); RimWorld Console Edition (Ludeon Studios); Warhammer 40000: Chaos Gate – Daemonhunters (Complex Games)
Developers	Best Performance	**Kari Wahlgren as Harley Quinn in Gotham Knights (WB Games Montréal)**; Ensemble of The Chant (Brass Token); Ensemble of Sunday Gold (BKOM Studio); Jacob Burgess as the Voice of the Highway in Glitchhikers: The Spaces Between (Silverstring Media)
Developers	Best Score/Soundtrack	**Cuphead: The Delicious Last Course (Studio MDHR)**; Tunic (TUNIC Team / ISOMETRICORP Games); FIFA 23 (EA Canada); Hardspace: Shipbreaker (Blackbird Interactive); Warhammer 40000: Chaos Gate – Daemonhunters (Complex Games)
Developers	Best Audio Design	**Tunic (TUNIC Team / ISOMETRICORP Games)**; FIFA 23 (EA Canada); Hardspace: Shipbreaker (Blackbird Interactive); Warhammer 40000: Chaos Gate – Daemonhunters (Complex Games)
Developers	Best Technology/Innovation	**Hardspace: Shipbreaker (Blackbird Interactive)**
Content Creators	Best Content Creator / Show	**Linus Sebastian (Linus Tech Tips)**; Autumn Rhodes; Ryan Letourneau (Northernlion); Kristen Michaela (kittyplays); James Hobson (The Hacksmith)
Content Creators	Best Streamer	**Stephanie "missharvey" Harvey**; Jeremy "Disguised Toast" Wang; Michael "Shroud" Grzesiek; Octavian "Kripparrian" Morosan; Imane "Pokimane" Anys
Esports	Best Esports Coach	**Rob "rob-wiz" Kennedy in Valorant**; Damian "daps" Steele in Counter-Strike: Global Offensive; Dylan Falco in League of Legends; Braxton "Allushin" Lagarec in Rocket League; Gabriel "Invert" Zoltan-Johan in League of Legends
Esports	Best Esports Event	**Overwatch League 2022 – Summer Showdown (Blizzard Entertainment)**; Get On My Level 2022 (Even Matchup Gaming); Bell Esports Challenge 2022 (Bell Canada); Red Bull Campus Clutch 2022 – Canadian National Final (Red Bull); Vancouver Battle Royale: Resurrection (Vancouver Street Battle)
Esports	Best Esports Player	**Jacob "JKnaps" Knapman in Rocket League**; Mirna "athxna" Noureldin in Valorant; Jasmine "Jazzyk1ns" Manankil in Valorant; Sasha "Scarlett" Hostyn in Starcraft II; Tyson "TenZ" Ngo in Valorant
Esports	Best Gaming Talent	**Camille “Camco” Salazar-Hadaway**; Alex “Vansilli” Nguyen; Jennifer “LemonKiwi” Pichette; Isaac "Azael" Cummings-Bentley; Parker "Interro" Mackay

==== CGA 2025 ====
Award	Winner
Game of the Year	**Balatro (LocalThunk)**; BIOMORPH (Lucid Dreams Studios); Lil' Guardsman (Hilltop Studios); Été (Impossible); Dragon Age: The Veilguard (BioWare); 1000xRESIST (Sunset Visitor)
Studio of the Year	**LocalThunk**; Inflexion Games; Hilltop Studios; Behaviour Interactive; BioWare
Best Art Direction	**1000xRESIST (Sunset Visitor)**; Lil' Guardsman (Hilltop Studios); Été (Impossible); Dragon Age: The Veilguard (BioWare); Venture to the Vile (Cut to Bits)
Best Narrative	**Dragon Age: The Veilguard (BioWare)**; Lil Guardsman (Hilltop Studios); Times & Galaxy (Copychaser Games); 1000xRESIST (Sunset Visitor); Venture to the Vile (Cut to Bits)
Best Game Design	**Balatro (LocalThunk)**; Été (Impossible); Dragon Age: The Veilguard (BioWare); Beastieball (Wishes Unlimited); The Outlast Trials (Red Barrels)
Best Performance	**Humberly González as Kay Vess in Star Wars Outlaws (Ubisoft Toronto / Massive Entertainment)**; Nhi Do as Watcher in 1000xRESIST (Sunset Visitor); Ben Burnes in Moving Houses (Gordon Little); Matthew Mercer as the Viper in Dragon Age: The Veilguard (BioWare)
Best Score/Soundtrack	**Dragon Age: The Veilguard (BioWare)**; Lil Guardsman (Hilltop Studios); Été (Impossible); 1000xRESIST (Sunset Visitor); Spirit City: Lofi Sessions (Homework Radio)
Best Audio Design	**Dragon Age: The Veilguard (BioWare)**; Balatro (LocalThunk); Été (Impossible); Lil' Guardsman (Hilltop Studios); 1000xRESIST (Sunset Visitor)
Best Technology/Innovation	**Homeworld 3 (Blackbird Interactive)**; Moving Houses (Gordon Little); Times & Galaxy (Copychaser Games); Dragon Age: The Veilguard (BioWare); Balatro (LocalThunk)
Best Debut Indie Game	**Balatro (LocalThunk)**; Spiral (Folklore Games); Été (Impossible); 1000xRESIST (Sunset Visitor); Nightingale (Inflexion Games)
Best Debut Studio	**LocalThunk**; Folklore Games; Impossible; Sunset Visitor; Inflexion Games
Most Innovative Studio	**BioWare**; Folklore Games; Lucid Dreams Studio; Red Barrels
Best Esports Player	**Sarah "sarah_frags" Simpson (Shopify Rebellion Gold)**; Russel "Twistzz" Van Dulken (Team Liquid); Sasha "Scarlett" Hostyn (Shopify Rebellion); Tyson "TenZ" Ngo (Sentinels); Artour "Arteezy" Babaev (Shopify Rebellion)
Best Esports Organization	**Toronto Ultra**; Lazarus Esports; Toronto Defiant; Luminosity Gaming; Shopify Rebellion
Best Esports Event	**Call of Duty League** **2024: Stage 3 Major (Activision)**; Electric Clash 2024; Toronto Ultra Major III 2024 (Toronto Ultra); Bell Esports Challenge 2024 (Bell Canada); BLAST R6 Major Montreal 2024 (BLAST)
Best Content Creator / Show	**Pokimane**; Cece; Nicholas “Nick Eh 30” Amyoony; Nabil "Aiekillu" Lahrech; Ashley Roboto; Michael "Shroud" Grzesiek

==== CGA 2026 ====
Award	Winner
Game of the Year	**South of Midnight (Compulsion Games)**; Assassin's Creed Shadows (Ubisoft Québec); Hell is Us (Rogue Factor); Lost Records: Bloom & Rage (DON'T NOD Montréal); Wanderstop (Ivy Road)
Studio of the Year	**Compulsion Games**; Digital Extremes; Rogue Factor; Tribute Games; Yellow Brick Games
Fan Choice of the Year (Note: Presented by the Entertainment Software Association of Canada)	**Lost Records: Bloom & Rage (DON'T NOD Montréal)**; 33 Immortals (Thunder Lotus Games); Assassin's Creed Shadows (Ubisoft Québec); Battlefield 6 (Motive Studio); Eternal Strands (Yellow Brick Games); Foundation (Polymorph Games); Fresh Tracks (Buffalo Buffalo); Hell is Us (Rogue Factor); South of Midnight (Compulsion Games); Warframe:The Old Peace (Digital Extremes)
Best Art Direction	**South of Midnight (Compulsion Games)**; Lost Records: Bloom & Rage (DON'T NOD Montréal); Eternal Strands (Yellow Brick Games); Marvel Cosmic Invasion (Tribute Games); 33 Immortals (Thunder Lotus Games)
Best Narrative	**South of Midnight (Compulsion Games)**; Assassin's Creed Shadows (Ubisoft Québec); Hell is Us (Rogue Factor); Lost Records: Bloom & Rage (Don’t Nod Montréal); Wanderstop (Ivy Road)
Best Game Design	**South of Midnight (Compulsion Games)**; Assassin's Creed Shadows (Ubisoft Québec); Battlefield 6 (Motive Studio); Hell is Us (Rogue Factor); Eternal Strands (Yellow Brick Games)
Best Performance (Note: Presented by ACTRA Toronto)	**Elias Toufexis as Rémi in Hell is Us (Rogue Factor)**; Erica Luttrell as Melissa Mills in Battlefield 6 (Motive Studio); Olivia Lepore as Swann Holloway in Lost Records: Bloom & Rage (DON'T NOD Montréal); Momona Tamada as Oni-yuri in Assassin's Creed Shadows (Ubisoft Québec); Peter Shinkoda as Fujibayashi Nagato in Assassin's Creed Shadows (Ubisoft Québec)
Best Score/Soundtrack	**South of Midnight (Compulsion Games)**; Assassin's Creed Shadows (Ubisoft Québec); Eternal Strands (Yellow Brick Games); Lost Records: Bloom & Rage (DON'T NOD Montréal); Marvel Cosmic Invasion (Tribute Games)
Best Audio Design (Note: Presented by JBL Quantum)	**South of Midnight (Compulsion Games)**; Assassin's Creed Shadows (Ubisoft Québec); Battlefield 6 (Motive Studio); Hell is Us (Rogue Factor); Eternal Strands (Yellow Brick Games)
Best Indie Game (Note: Presented by Red Barrels)	**Wanderstop (Ivy Road)**; Ambrosia Sky: Act One (Soft Rains); Ctrl Alt Deal (Only By Midnight); Fresh Tracks (Buffalo Buffalo); Marvel Cosmic Invasion (Tribute Games)
Best VR/AR Game	**Elsewhere Electric (Games by Stitch)**; Chronostrike (Pentachromatic Games); Fruit Golf (Coal Car Studio); Prison Boss Prohibition (TREBUCHET); Verse VR (Lofty Sky Entertainment)
Best PC Game	**Battlefield 6 (Motive Studio)**; Aloft (Astrolabe Interactive); Ambrosia Sky: Act One (Soft Rains); Eternal Strands (Yellow Brick Games); Foundation (Polymorph Games)
Best Console Game (Note: Presented by Best Buy Canada)	**South of Midnight (Compulsion Games)**; Assassin's Creed Shadows (Ubisoft Québec); Battlefield 6 (Motive Studio); Hell is Us (Rogue Factor); Marvel Cosmic Invasion (Tribute Games)
Best Mobile Game	**Tom Clancy's Rainbow Six Mobile (Ubisoft Montréal)**; EA Sports FC 26 Mobile (EA Vancouver); Elsewhere Electric (Games by Stitch); LHEA and the Word Spirit (Soul Fuel Games)
Innovation in Accessibility	**Assassin's Creed Shadows (Ubisoft Québec)**; EA Sports FC 26 (EA Vancouver); South of Midnight (Compulsion Games); Squeakross: Home Squeak Home (Alblune); Wanderstop (Ivy Road)
Best Esports Player	**Russel "Twistzz" Van Dulken (FaZe Clan)**; Adam “mada” Pampuch (NRG Esports); Brandon “Dashy” Otell (OpTic Texas); Keith “NAF” Markovic (Team Liquid); Troy “Canadian” Jaroslawski (Shopify Rebellion)
Best Esports and Gaming Organization	**Shopify Rebellion**; Raptors Uprising GC; OverActive Media; Vancouver Surge
Best Esports Event	**Raptors GC Tournament**; Battle of BC 7; Call of Duty Championship; Electric Clash 2025; Valorant Masters Toronto 2025
Best Esports Coach	**Loic "Effys" Savageau**; Antonin “AEC” Tran; Kurtis “Aui_2000” Ling; Mervin-Angelo “Dayos” Lachica; Shaun Byrne
Best Content Creator / Show (Note: Presented by VGLX)	**Victor Lucas**; Alex “Vansilli” Nguyen; Ashley Roboto; Nicholas “Nick Eh 30” Amyoony; Stef Sanjati
Game Changer	**Victor Lucas**

=== The Canadian Indie Game Awards ===
==== CIGA 2022 ====
Award	Winner
Indie Game of the Year	**Echo Generation** **(Cococucumber)**; Boyfriend Dungeon (Kitfox Games); Chicory: A Colorful Tale (Wishes Unlimited); Moonglow Bay (Bunnyhug); The Big Con (Mighty Yell Studios)
Best Narrative	**Echo Generation (Cococucumber)**; Boyfriend Dungeon (Kitfox Games); Chicory: A Colorful Tale (Wishes Unlimited); Impostor Factory (Freebird Games); Moonglow Bay (Bunnyhug)
Best Game Design	**Inscryption** **(Daniel Mullins Games)**; Chicory: A Colorful Tale (Wishes Unlimited); Echo Generation (Cococucumber); Moonglow Bay (Bunnyhug); The Vale: Shadow of the Crown (Falling Squirrel)
Best Art Direction	**Wytchwood (Alientrap)**; Backbone (Eggnut); Echo Generation (Cococucumber); Inscryption (Daniel Mullins Games); Raptor Boyfriend: A High School Romance (Rocket Adrift)
Best Animation	**Wytchwood (Alientrap)**; Chicory: A Colorful Tale (Wishes Unlimited); Moonglow Bay (Bunnyhug); Raptor Boyfriend: A High School Romance (Rocket Adrift); Winds & Leaves (TREBUCHET Studios)
Best Score/Soundtrack	**Echo Generation** **(Cococucumber)**; Chicory: A Colorful Tale (Wishes Unlimited); Moonglow Bay (Bunnyhug); The Big Con (Mighty Yell Studios); Wytchwood (Alientrap)
Best Audio Design	**The Vale: Shadow of the Crown** **(Falling Squirrel)**; Chicory: A Colorful Tale (Wishes Unlimited); Chivalry 2 (Torn Banner Studios); Goose Goose Duck (Gaggle Studios); Winds & Leaves (TREBUCHET Studios)
Best Technology/Innovation	**The Vale: Shadow of the Crown** **(Falling Squirrel)**; Chivalry 2 (Torn Banner Studios); Moonglow Bay (Bunnyhug); Winds & Leaves (TREBUCHET); Wytchwood (Alientrap)
Best Debut Indie Game	**Moonglow Bay** **(Bunnyhug)**; Circuit Superstars (Original Fire Games); Derelict Void (Stirling Games); Goose Goose Duck (Gaggle Studios); The Big Con (Mighty Yell Studios)
Best PC Game	**Inscryption** **(Daniel Mullins Games)**; Chivalry 2 (Torn Banner Studios); Impostor Factory (Freebird Games); Moonglow Bay (Bunnyhug); The Vale: Shadow of the Crown (Falling Squirrel)
Best Console Game	**Chivalry 2** **(Torn Banner Studios)**; Boyfriend Dungeon (Kitfox Games); Chicory: A Colorful Tale (Wishes Unlimited); Echo Generation (Cococucumber); Moonglow Bay (Bunnyhug)
Best Mobile Game	**Grindstone (C****apybara Games**); Big NEON Tower VS Tiny Square (Evil Objective); Goose Goose Duck (Gaggle Studios); Hotel Hermes (Adjective Noun Studios); Kairos: Heroes of Time (Neuro Solutions Group); NUTS (Joon, Pol, Muutsch, Char & Torfi)
Best Social/Casual Game	**NUTS (Joon, Pol, Muutsch, Char & Torfi)**; Circuit Superstars (Original Fire Games); Goose Goose Duck (Gaggle Studios); Lemnis Gate (Ratloop Games Canada); Super Animal Royale (Pixile Studios)

==== CIGA 2023 ====
Nomination Category	Award	Winner
Year Accolade	Indie Game of the Year	**Tunic (TUNIC Team / ISOMETRICORP Games)**; Nobody Saves the World (DrinkBox Studios); A Little to the Left (Max Inferno); Rogue Legacy 2 (Cellar Door Games); Hardspace: Shipbreaker (Blackbird Interactive)
Year Accolade	Studio of the Year	**TUNIC Team / ISOMETRICORP Games**; DrinkBox Studios; Silverstring Media; Cellar Door Games; Blackbird Interactive
Year Accolade	Best Console Game	**Tunic** **(TUNIC Team / ISOMETRICORP Games)**; Teenage Mutant Ninja Turtles: Shredder's Revenge (Tribute Games); Nobody Saves the World (DrinkBox Studios); Rogue Legacy 2 (Cellar Door Games); Infernax (Berzerk Studio)
Year Accolade	Best Debut Indie Game	**Tunic** **(TUNIC Team / ISOMETRICORP Games)**; A Little to the Left (Max Inferno); The Chant (Brass Token); Hardspace: Shipbreaker (Blackbird Interactive); Glitchhikers: The Spaces Between (Silverstring Media)
Year Accolade	Best Mobile/Casual Game	**Pupperazzi** **(Sundae Month)**; Knotwords (Zach Gage and Jack Schlesinger); INKS (State of Play); Melatonin (Half Asleep Games); A Little to the Left (Max Inferno)
Year Accolade	Best PC Game	**Tunic** **(TUNIC Team / ISOMETRICORP Games)**; Nobody Saves the World (DrinkBox Studios); Glitchhikers: The Spaces Between (Silverstring Media); Hardspace: Shipbreaker (Blackbird Interactive); Rogue Legacy 2 (Cellar Door Games)
Developers	Best Animation	**Cuphead: The Delicious Last Course** **(Studio MDHR)**; Tunic (TUNIC Team / ISOMETRICORP Games); Nobody Saves the World (DrinkBox Studios); Rogue Legacy 2 (Cellar Door Games); Ember Knights (Doom Turtle)
Developers	Best Art Direction	**Cuphead: The Delicious Last Course** **(Studio MDHR)**; Nobody Saves the World (DrinkBox Studios); Mythforce (Beamdog); I was a Teenage Exocolonist (Northway Games); Glitchhikers: The Spaces Between (Silverstring Media)
Developers	Best Audio Design	**Tunic** **(TUNIC Team / ISOMETRICORP Games)**; Hardspace: Shipbreaker (Blackbird Interactive); Session: Skate Sim (Crea-ture Studios); Melatonin; Paradise Marsh
Developers	Best Game Design	**Tunic** **(TUNIC Team / ISOMETRICORP Games)**; Nobody Saves the World (DrinkBox Studios); The Last Hero of Nostalgia (Over the Moon); Rogue Legacy 2 (Cellar Door Games)
Developers	Best Narrative	**I was a Teenage Exocolonist** **(Northway Games)**; Hardspace: Shipbreaker (Blackbird Interactive); Glitchhikers: The Spaces Between (Silverstring Media); The Chant (Brass Token); The Last Hero of Nostalgia (Over the Moon)
Developers	Best Score/Soundtrack	**Cuphead: The Delicious Last Course (Studio MDHR)**; The Last Hero of Nostalgia (Over the Moon); Tunic (TUNIC Team / ISOMETRICORP Games); Glitchhikers: The Spaces Between (Silverstring Media); Hardspace: Shipbreaker (Blackbird Interactive)
Developers	Best Technology	**Cuphead: The Delicious Last Course (Studio MDHR)**; Session: Skate Sim (Crea-ture Studios); Nerf Ultimate Championship (Secret Location); Hardspace: Shipbreaker (Blackbird Interactive); The Chant (Brass Token)

== Records ==
=== Canadian Videogame Awards ===
==== Franchises ====
Franchise	Publisher	Awards	Nominations
Assassin's Creed	Ubisoft	20	64
Deus Ex	Square Enix	10	28
Far Cry	Ubisoft	10	26
Mass Effect	Electronic Arts	7	14
Child of Light	Ubisoft	5	9
Sword & Sworcery	Capybara Games	5	9
Dragon Age	Electronic Arts	4	11
Hitman	Square Enix	3	10
The Gallery	Cloudhead Games	3	9
Watch Dogs	Ubisoft	3	9
Batman: Arkham	Warner Bros. Games	2	11
Mark of the Ninja	Klei Entertainment	2	11
NHL	Electronic Arts	2	9
Guacamelee!	Drinkbox Studios	2	8
Sound Shapes	Queasy Games	2	7
Dead by Daylight	Behaviour Interactive	2	5
Skylanders	Activision	2	5
Stories	Spearhead Games	2	5
ModNation Racers	Sony Interactive Entertainment	2	2

==== Developers ====
Developer	Headquarters	Awards	Nominations
Ubisoft Montréal	Montréal	33	118
BioWare	Edmonton	11	25
Eidos-Montréal	Montréal	10	20
Capybara Games	Toronto	8	21
Ubisoft Québec	Québec	6	12
Klei Entertainment	Vancouver	4	36
Square Enix Montréal	Montréal	4	25
Drinkbox Studios	Toronto	4	19
EA Canada	Vancouver	3	32
Cloudhead Games	Qualicum Beach	3	9
WB Games Montréal	Montréal	2	10
Beenox	Québec	2	8
Thunder Lotus Games	Montréal	2	8
United Front Games	Vancouver	2	8
Queasy Games	Toronto	2	7
Behaviour Interactive	Montréal	2	5
Spearhead Games	Montréal	2	5

=== Canadian Game Awards ===
==== Franchises ====
Franchise	Publisher	Awards	Nominations
South of Midnight	Xbox Game Studios	7	9
Assassin's Creed	Ubisoft	6	21
Tunic	Finji	5	6
Far Cry	Ubisoft	4	13
The Legend of Zelda	Nintendo	4	5
Hardspace	Blackbird Interactive	3	10
Dragon Age	Electronic Arts	3	8
Guardians of the Galaxy	Square Enix	3	8
Spiritfarer	Thunder Lotus	3	6
Balatro	LocalThunk	3	5
Star Wars: Squadrons	Electronic Arts	2	5
Age of Empires	Xbox Game Studios	2	4
Cuphead	Studio MDHR	2	2

==== Developers ====
Developer	Headquarters	Awards	Nominations
Compulsion Games	Montréal	8	10
ISOMETRICORP Games	Halifax	6	7
LocalThunk	Regina	5	7
Ubisoft Montréal	Montréal	4	25
BioWare	Edmonton	4	11
Blackbird Interactive	Vancouver	4	11
Brace Yourself Games	Vancouver	4	6
Motive Studio	Montréal	3	13
Ubisoft Toronto	Toronto	3	13
Thunder Lotus	Montréal	3	9
Eidos-Montréal	Montréal	3	8
Relic Entertainment	Vancouver	2	5
Studio MDHR	Toronto	2	2

=== Canadian Indie Game Awards ===
==== Franchises ====
Franchise	Publisher	Awards	Nominations
Tunic	Finji	6	8
Cuphead	Studio MDHR	4	4
Echo Generation	Cococucumber	3	6
The Vale: Shadow of the Crown	Falling Squirrel	2	4
Wytchwood	Whitethorn Games	2	4
Inscryption	Devolver Digital	2	3

==== Developers ====
Developer	Headquarters	Awards	Nominations
ISOMETRICORP Games	Halifax	7	9
Studio MDHR	Toronto	4	4
Cococucumber	Toronto	3	6
Alientrap	Toronto	2	4
Falling Squirrel	St. Catharines	2	4
Daniel Mullins Games	Vancouver	2	3

== Reception ==
=== Canadian content ===
Following the 2026 edition of the awards, the CBC highlighted that none of the Game of the Year nominees were games that were set in Canada. This was noted as being a result of games being an international industry that can apply itself to any locale. However, it was also found to be due to Canada itself not being seen as very marketable. Developers of indie games set in Canada, such as The Long Dark, have said that investors shy away from Canadian settings. Another indie developer, who had set their game in Toronto, reported that they had to redo their entire funding plan because investors preferred if they would instead place it in New York City. The success found by Clair Obscur: Expedition 33 in embracing the culture of France was raised as a promising point for a Canadian game to emulate.
