= Waveform (disambiguation) =

A waveform is the shape and form of a wave.

Waveform may also refer to:

- Waveform (podcast), a podcast started in 2019 by Marques Brownlee
- Waveform (video game), a 2012 puzzle game
- WAV, the Waveform audio file format
- Waveform Records, an American record label
- Corneal Waveform technology, technology of ophthalmology
