= Melatonin (disambiguation) =

Melatonin is a natural chemical compound and hormone.

Melatonin may also refer to:

- Melatonin (video game)
- "Melatonin" (song), a 2026 song by American singer Tinashe
- "Melatonin", a song from the A Tribe Called Quest album We Got It from Here... Thank You 4 Your Service
- "Melatonin", a song from the Upsahl album Lady Jesus
- "Melatonin", a song from the Silversun Pickups album Carnavas
- "Melatonin", a 2019 song by German rapper Sido

== See also ==
- Melatonin as a medication and supplement
