= Greenspace =

Greenspace or green space may refer to:

- Green space or open space reserve, protected areas of undeveloped landscape.
- Urban green space, open space areas for "parks", "green spaces", and other open areas
- Greenspace, the natural environment.
- Greenbelt, a policy or land use designation used in land use planning.
- Greenway (landscape), a linear greenspace running through an urban area.
- Green infrastructure, a concept in land use planning
- Greenspace Information for Greater London (GiGL), the environmental record centre for London
- GreenSpace (video game)
