= Goose Goose Duck =

2021 social deduction video game

- Developer: Gaggle Studios
- Publisher: Gaggle Studios
- Engine: Unity
- Platforms: Windows; macOS; Android; iOS
- Release: 2021
- Genre: Social deduction
- Mode: Multiplayer

Goose Goose Duck is a 2021 free-to-play online multiplayer social deduction game developed and published by Gaggle Studios for Windows, macOS, Android and iOS. Up to 16 players act as either geese who have to complete tasks around a map while trying to identify ducks among them, who try to kill geese without being voted out. Critics widely compared it to Among Us.

The game grew sharply in popularity in late 2022, particularly in South Korea and China, after BTS member V streamed it on Weverse. On January 5, 2023, it peaked at 563,677 concurrent players on Steam, making it the third most-played game on the platform and surpassing the record of 447,476 held by Among Us. The surge caused server crashes, and Gaggle said it was seeking official partners in China after a Chinese company applied to trademark the game's name. Later that month, Gaggle reported more than 800,000 concurrent players across PC and mobile.

Digital Trends called it "a pretty blatant Among Us clone" but "a good time", while Den of Geek said it offered "a surprisingly solid social deduction experience". It was nominated for Best Mobile Game at the 2022 Canadian Game Awards.
