= Warhammer 40,000: Carnage =

2014 video game

- Developer: Roadhouse Games
- Publisher: Roadhouse Games
- Series: Warhammer 40,000
- Engine: Unity
- Platforms: iOS, Android, Windows
- Release: iOS; May 8, 2014; Android; June 20, 2014; Windows, Linux, macOS; May 11, 2016
- Genres: Run and gun, hack and slash

Warhammer 40,000: Carnage is a 2014 mobile game developed and published by Canadian indie studio Roadhouse Games Ltd. It is based on Games Workshop's tabletop wargame franchise Warhammer 40,000. It released for the iOS and Android platforms in May and June 2014, respectively. Versions for Windows, Linux and macOS were released in May 2016 under the title Warhammer 40,000: Carnage Champions.

== Gameplay ==
Carnage is a single-player, action, side-scrolling shooter where players take on the role of one of the available Space Marine Chapters, which is a change from the strategy-oriented style of most Warhammer 40,000 games. There is a heavy RPG element where players progress, level up their Space Marines and collect Wargear to become more powerful as missions become more difficult. Players can move left and right, jump, and block, with two main attack buttons: shoot and melee. Players can also utilize grenades and Rage Attack when available. Each weapon has unique abilities, and attributes, where some even have their own special charge attacks for added damage. A core part of the game is finding the right combination of Wargear to take on each mission, as missions become more difficult with varying types of enemies and challenges.

Warhammer 40,000: Carnage takes place on the planet of Mithra, on the outskirts of the Imperium. The story behind Carnage is written by Warhammer 40,000 novelist Graham McNeill.

=== Space Marines ===
While the only playable character at the beginning of the game is of the Ultramarine Chapter, additional Space Marine Chapters, such as the Space Wolves, Dark Angels, and Blood Angels, can be unlocked through various methods. New Chapters are added regularly through content updates. Each Space Marine has their own campaign and exclusive missions, which take place on the same campaign map. There are currently 3 campaign maps with over 60 missions available for each Chapter. The story of the game is revealed through the Codex through entries unlocked by progressing through the campaign; each Chapter unlocks their own Codex entries as well.

=== Wargear ===
There are over 600 items of Wargear in Carnage. Melee Weapons include variants of Chainswords, Thunder Hammers, and Power Fists. Ranged Weapons include many different types of Boltguns, Bolt Pistols, and Storm Bolters, all with varied attributes and abilities. There are 3 visual tiers of Armour for each Space Marine Chapter for the Head, Chest, Greaves, with additional accessories such as Jump Packs and Purity Seals.

The level and quality of Wargear is split into 5 tiers: Common, Superior, Rare, Epic, and Mastercraft, with Mastercraft Wargear being the most rare and valued.

The available slots to equip Wargear are Melee Weapon, Ranged Weapon, head, chest, greaves, and an accessory slot. A new slot was introduced during the Space Wolf Update for the newly introduced Support Drone feature, which allows players to equip a Battle Support drone that will aid players in battle with either Melee, Ranged, Blocking, or Healing abilities.

Wargear is collected through Supply Caches, which players can obtain after completing a Mission, or by utilizing their Gold currency.

== Reception ==
Reception

Aggregate score
Aggregator	Score
Metacritic	75/100

Review scores
Publication	Score
Slide to Play	4/4
AppSpy	4/5
Pocket Gamer	3.5/5
148 Apps	3.5/5
AppSaga	4/5

Carnage first launched on iOS in May 2014, and was generally well received. Many described the game as a must-try for any Warhammer 40,000 fan, and a decent game in general. The character upgrading/customization was the best feature of the game to many. Criticisms of the game were mainly about the repetitive nature of the title, and concerns over In-app purchases.
