= Moonglow Bay =

2021 video game

- Developer: Bunnyhug
- Publisher: Coatsink
- Composer: Lena Raine
- Platforms: Microsoft Windows; Xbox One; Xbox Series X/S; Nintendo Switch; PlayStation 4; PlayStation 5
- Release: Windows, Xbox One, Series X/S; October 26, 2021; PS4, PS5, Switch; April 11, 2024
- Genres: Fishing; Role-playing
- Mode: Co-op mode; single-player

Moonglow Bay is a fishing role-playing video game developed by indie studio Bunnyhug and published by Coatsink. After being announced at the ID@Xbox event in March 2021 and the "Wholesome Direct" of E3 2021 on June 12, 2021, the game was launched on October 26, 2021, on Microsoft Windows via Steam, Xbox One, and Xbox Series X/S; it was then released on the Epic Games Store on November 11 of that year. In April 2024, it was ported to Nintendo Switch, PlayStation 4 and PlayStation 5. The player character, an accountant in their sixties, moves to a small town where they fish on a boat and cook dishes.

== Plot ==
The gameplay of Moonglow Bay begins when the player's partner is declared dead after being missing for three years. The player character is joined by their daughter and resolves to fulfill their partner's dream of revitalizing the old fishing town they call home. The daughter and the inhabitants of the town teach the player to fish, cook, and upgrade the boat. After learning that the town's fishing industry died upon hearing too many tall tales of the ocean life, the player must confront a famous fish called The Ruin to prove to the townsfolk that the legends are overblown. This restarts the town's fishing industry, but the fisherman inform the player that a big storm is keeping them from success. Upon investigation, the storm turns out to be caused by an upset electric fish shocking the area. After freeing the fish, the player happens upon a large gate that seals away a portion of the bay. The townsfolk tell a story about the founding twins of the town, who passed the key down until it was thrown into the ocean. After retrieving the key and opening the gate, the player finds a pair of fighting fish. Initially planning to remove one of the fish to make money to invest into the town, the player instead finds a way to separate them and decides to allow them both to live separately in the lake out of respect for nature. Upon returning to the town, the player learns that there is ink flowing throughout the bay, making it impossible to fish and making it unlikely for tourists to return. The lighthouse keeper knows the cause and the solution, but is reluctant to share because he feels that the town does not want to get better. Similarly to the player character, he too once wanted to revitalize the fishing town, and was disappointed that the town's fishing industry was diminished regardless. Disappointed, the player character stays home for many days. Eventually the daughter brings her out of the house, and both the player character and the lighthouse keeper are encouraged to see local fishermen removing ink from the bay in order to keep it clean.

Throughout the above plotline, there are many side quests that involve investing in improving the town and learning about the backstory of each of the townspeople. Additionally, cleaning up the town and stocking the aquarium bring more tourists to the area.

== Reception ==
On Metacritic the game has a score of 65/100 indicating mixed reviews.
