= Cryptark =

2017 action roguelike video game

- Developers: Alientrap; Sickhead Games (PS4)
- Publisher: Alientrap
- Programmer: Lee Vermeulen
- Artist: Jesse McGibney
- Composer: Ryan Roth
- Engine: XNA; MonoGame (PS4)
- Platforms: Windows, OS X, Linux, PlayStation 4
- Release: Windows, PS4: WW: June 20, 2017; OS X, Linux: WW: August 3, 2018
- Genre: Roguelike
- Mode: Single-player

Cryptark is a roguelike video game developed and published by Alientrap for Microsoft Windows, OS X, Linux, and PlayStation 4. The game was released on Microsoft Windows and PlayStation 4 on June 20, 2017.

A sequel, Gunhead, was released in November 2023. Unlike its predecessor, Gunhead is played from a first-person perspective with VR implementation being a post-release possibility.

== Gameplay ==
Cryptark is a 2D sci-fi shooter that challenges players with boarding and neutralizing procedurally generated alien starships to earn income for their Privateering enterprise. Players beat each mission by destroying an enemy ship's central core, earning money that they can then use to purchase weapons/equipment for their next missions. Once the player runs out of money the campaign is over.

== Reception ==
Cryptark received generally favorable reviews from critics, with a score on review aggregator Metacritic of 80/100 and 75/100 for the Microsoft Windows and PlayStation 4 versions respectively.

=== Reviews ===
- Ramon Nafria (15 July 2015). "Analysis of Cryptark for PC". Vandal.
- Daniel Weissenberger (10 July 2017). "Cryptark Review". GameCritics.com.
- MARIO BACCIGALUP (7 July 2017). "Cryptark Review". Games Machine.
- SURIEL VAZQUEZ (28 June 2018). "Cryptark Review". gameinformer. Archived from the original on July 1, 2017.
- Benjamin Schmädig (12 July 2017). "Test Cryptark". 4Players.
