= Bloodroots =

2020 video game

- Developer: Paper Cult
- Composer: Vibe Avenue
- Platforms: PlayStation 4, Microsoft Windows, Switch, Xbox Series X/S
- Release: 28 February 2020
- Genre: Hack and slash

Bloodroots is a hack and slash video game developed by Paper Cult. The game was released on February 28, 2020, for Nintendo Switch, PlayStation 4, and Microsoft Windows, and later for Xbox Series X/S on 15 July 2021. Drawing inspiration from the Western genre, players assume the role of Mr. Wolf, a man driven by a quest for revenge after being betrayed.

== Gameplay ==
Bloodroots is an isometric hack and slash action game where players control Mr. Wolf, using a variety of melee and ranged weapons to defeat enemies across multiple levels, divided into three acts. Weapons have limited durability and will break after repeated use. Players progress through levels by eliminating all on-screen enemies earning a score and grade based on their performance at the end of each stage.

== Reception ==
Reception

Aggregate scores
Aggregator	Score
Metacritic	PS4: 81/100; NS: 75/100; PC: 76/100
OpenCritic	77% recommend

Review scores
Publication	Score
Destructoid	8.5/10
Game Informer	8.5/10
GameSpot	8/10
IGN	8/10
Nintendo Life	8/10
PC Gamer (US)	78/100

Bloodroots received positive reviews from critics. On the review aggregator Metacritic, the game scored 81/100 for the PlayStation 4 release, 75/100 for the Nintendo Switch version, and 76/100 for the PC version. Fellow review aggregator OpenCritic assessed that the game received strong approval, being recommended by 77% of critics. Critics praised the game's extensive arsenal of weapons available for players to use, but criticized the platforming aspects and occasional unfair deaths.

Jonathon Dornbush of IGN rated the game 8/10, noting that, despite "some slippery nuisances in certain level designs, and a somewhat predictable ending to the otherwise fun story, Paper Cult has crafted a bloody fun time." Kevin McClusky of Destructoid also rated the game positively, writing that, "[despite] some minor flaws, Bloodroots is a manically fun game that oozes style."
