= Ultimate Chicken Horse =

2016 video game

- Developer: Clever Endeavour Games
- Publisher: Clever Endeavour Games
- Composer: Vibe Avenue
- Engine: Unity
- Platforms: Microsoft Windows; Linux; Mac; Nintendo Switch; PlayStation 4; Xbox One
- Release: Microsoft Windows, Linux, Mac: WW: 4 March 2016; PlayStation 4: WW: 12 December 2017; Xbox One: WW: 15 December 2017; Nintendo Switch: WW: 25 September 2018
- Genre: Platform
- Mode: Multiplayer

Ultimate Chicken Horse is a multiplayer competitive platform video game developed and published by Canadian studio Clever Endeavour Games. It was released for Microsoft Windows on 4 March 2016, PlayStation 4 and Xbox One in December 2017, and Nintendo Switch on 25 September 2018.

A spiritual successor, titled Ultimate Sheep Raccoon, was released on 9 December 2025.

== Gameplay ==
Screenshot of "Free Play" mode

Ultimate Chicken Horse is a platform video game where players assume the role of one of various animals. The goal of each game is to score points by building a platform level one piece at a time (per player) and race each other to a flag on the other side of the level. Players add obstacles designed to challenge their opponents, while also making sure they themselves can handle their handiwork. If nobody reaches the goal, or if everybody does, nobody gets any points. Points are awarded each round for various achievements, such as reaching the goal first, or setting a successful trap. The winner of the match is the player who reaches a set number of points or has the most points after a set number of rounds. Each round is estimated to last a minute.

The PC, Mobile, Nintendo Switch, Xbox and PlayStation versions of the game support cross-play online.

== Development ==
The concept for Ultimate Chicken Horse emerged in October 2014 during a game jam. Developer Richard Atlas stated in an interview with Gamasutra that he was in the process of forming Clever Endeavour Games when it came about. The final team included personnel who had previously worked on games such as Gardenarium and Rimworld.

Ultimate Chicken Horse was primarily built in the Unity engine.

== Reception ==
Ultimate Chicken Horse

Aggregate score
Aggregator	Score
Metacritic	(PS4) 79/100

Review score
Publication	Score
The Escapist	(PC) 3.5/5

The PlayStation 4 version of Ultimate Chicken Horse received "generally favorable" reviews, according to review aggregator Metacritic. The Escapist said the game "does everything it tries to do very well, but a few quibbles keep it from greatness," and recommended "a better guiding hand for stage building, especially for new players".
