= Hoard (video game) =

2010 video game

- Developer(s): Big Sandwich Games Inc.
- Publisher(s): Big Sandwich Games Inc.
- Engine: Clubhouse Engine
- Platform(s): PlayStation 3, PlayStation Portable, Microsoft Windows, Mac OS X, Linux
- Release: PS3: NA: November 2, 2010; PAL: June 2, 2011; PSP: NA: March 22, 2011; Win & OS X: NA: April 4, 2011
- Genre(s): Action, strategy, shoot 'em up
- Mode(s): Single-player, multiplayer, cooperative

Hoard (trademarked as HOARD) is an action-strategy video game developed by Canadian studio Big Sandwich Games Inc. It was released on November 2, 2010, in North America on PlayStation Network, on April 4, 2011, for the PC and Mac on Steam, and on June 2, 2011, on the PAL PlayStation Network regions.

== Development ==
Hoard was released for the PlayStation 3 on November 2, 2010. The PSP version of Hoard was released on March 22, 2011, in the United States.

== Reception ==
Reception

Aggregate score
Aggregator	Score
Metacritic	75% (PS3); 65% (PC)

Review scores
Publication	Score
1Up.com	B (PS3, PC)
GameSpot	7.5/10 (PS3)
IGN	8.0/10 (PS3); 7.0/10 (PSP)

Review aggregator Metacritic rated the PlayStation 3 version of Hoard at 75 percent and the PC version at 65 percent.

IGN awarded Hoard "Best Quick Fix" in their PlayStation 3 Best of 2010 Awards, and also nominated the game for "Best Competitive Multiplayer."
