= The Gallery (video game) =

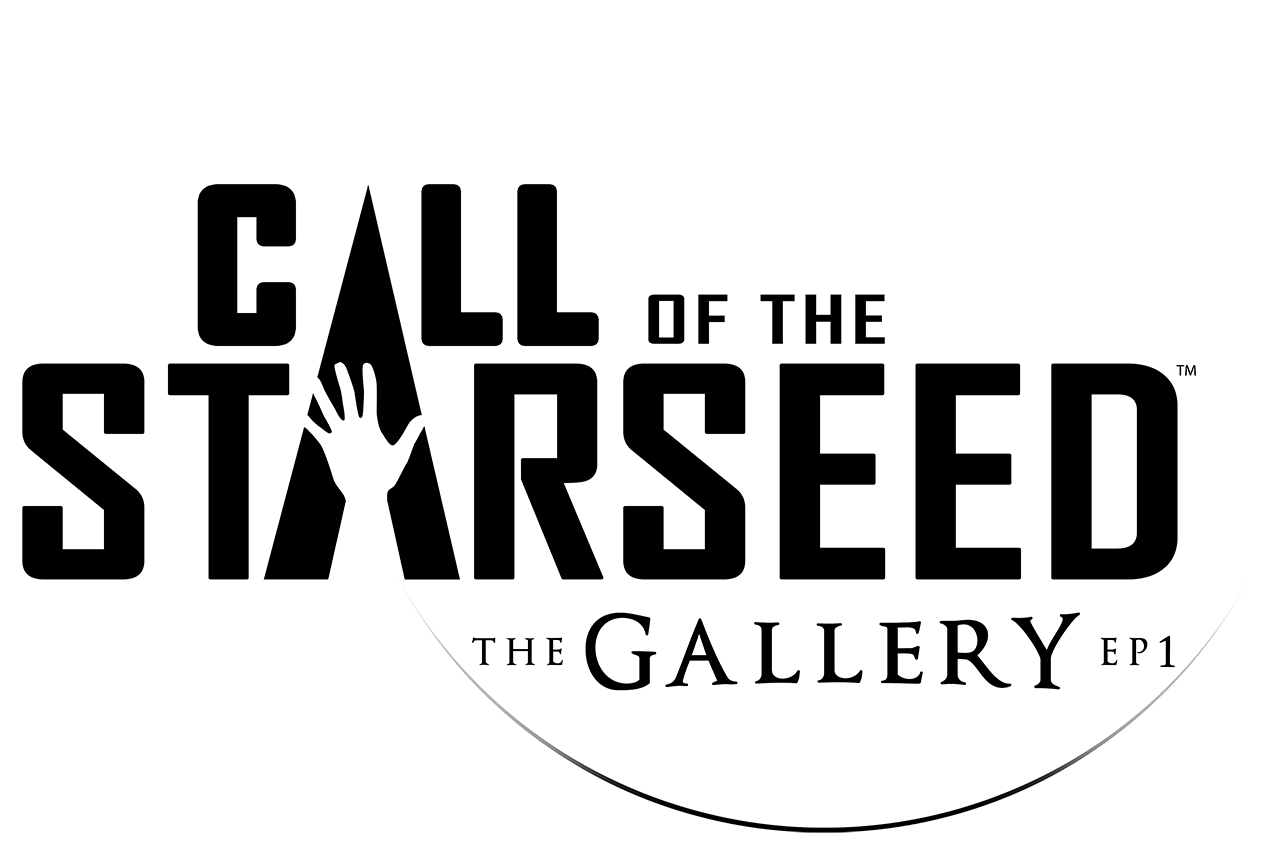
- Developer: Cloudhead Games
- Publisher: Cloudhead Games
- Composer: Jeremy Soule
- Engine: Unity 5
- Platforms: Microsoft Windows, PlayStation 4
- Release: Episode 1: HTC Vive; WW: April 5, 2016 Oculus Touch; WW: December 6, 2016 PlayStation VR; WW: TBA
- Genres: Adventure, Puzzle
- Mode: Single-player

The Gallery (formerly The Gallery: Six Elements) is an episodic virtual reality video game developed and published by Cloudhead Games for the HTC Vive and Oculus Rift with Oculus Touch. The game uses the Unity game engine, and was inspired by 80s fantasy adventures like The Goonies and The Dark Crystal.

== Development ==
The game had a successful Kickstarter campaign and raised about $85,000. In August 2015, the game dropped the "Six Elements" subtitle in favor of subtitles for each episode. At least three episodes are planned.

Ports to the Oculus Rift and PlayStation VR are currently in development.

== Call of the Starseed ==
An early iteration of Call of the Starseed (then "The Six Elements") was shown alongside the public reveal of SteamVR at GDC 2015. After launching alongside the HTC Vive in April 2016, Call of the Starseed was bundled with the headset from August 2016 until April 2017. Call of the Starseed was again shown at the reveal of the SteamVR "Knuckles" controllers at Steam Dev Days 2016.

== Heart of the Emberstone ==
The second episode, Heart of the Emberstone, released on October 18, 2017 for HTC Vive and Oculus Rift with Oculus Touch. The release came after multiple delays. A PSVR port is also announced as planned.

== Episode 3 ==
While a third episode was originally planned, there was nothing under development as of December, 2020. A third episode is contingent on substantial growth in the virtual reality market as stated by the developer in a Reddit AMA: "I know there's a bunch of us in the studio that would love to close out the trilogy, but we really want it to be grand. If VR tips over and mainstream adoption becomes sustainable for big games like The Gallery, I think an EP3 could be on the table for the future."

== Release and reception ==
Aggregate review scores
Game	Metacritic
Call of the Starseed	79/100
Heart of the Emberstone	86/100

Call of the Starseed received critical acclaim, with TIME including it in its "best 5 HTC Vive launch games." As of December 2016, the game remains the third highest rated HTC Vive game across VR game reviewers.

Heart of the Emberstone also received player and critical acclaim, with VR news outlet Road to VR calling it "longer, stronger, and more immersive" than the first episode.
