= The Vale: Shadow of the Crown =

- Developer: Falling Squirrel
- Publishers: Falling Squirrel (PC, Xbox); Nejcraft (NS, PS4, PS5)
- Platforms: Windows; Xbox One; Nintendo Switch; PlayStation 4; PlayStation 5
- Release: Windows, Xbox One; August 19, 2021; Nintendo Switch, PlayStation 4, PlayStation 5; March 14, 2024
- Genre: Action role-playing
- Mode: Single-player

The Vale: Shadow of the Crown is a 2021 action role-playing game developed by Falling Squirrel. Players control a blind princess. The game has few visuals and is almost entirely an audio game.

== Gameplay ==
Alexandra, a blind princess, arrives at a remote keep just as war breaks out. She seeks to return home, where her older brother rules. The Vale: Shadow of the Crown is an action role-playing game, but it has very few visuals. There are menus, which are voiced for blind players, but most of the time, the only visual effects are limited to specks of light that occasionally change shape or color based on environmental cues. Players must rely on sound staging to locate points of interest, such as following the sound of a blacksmith striking his anvil. Alexandra befriends a sighted shepherd who assists her, and she can rescue a dog who will join her. Alexandra was trained in combat by her uncle. During combat, players must identify which direction enemies are approaching from and parry their attacks. Audio cues give hints to their strategy, such as whether they intend to charge at her or flank her. When striking back, quick attacks may be made at will, but heavy attacks, which can break an enemy's defenses, take longer to execute.

== Development ==
Falling Squirrel is based in Canada, and The Vale: Shadow of the Crown is the company's first game. Developer Dave Evans had previously worked on bigger budget video games as a cinematic director but did not have any previous connection to the blind community. The initial concept of an audio game came from Evans' desire to tell big stories without having to worry about budgets. When he realized that the blind community would likely be interested in the project, Evans contacted the CNIB Foundation and used them for focus testing. The Vale: Shadow of the Crown won funding from Ubisoft's Indie Series and received further funding through the Ontario Creates government grant. It was released for Windows and Xbox One on August 19, 2021. On March 14, 2024, Nejcraft released ports of The Vale: Shadow of the Crown for Nintendo Switch, PlayStation 4, and PlayStation 5, marking the game's debut on these platforms. The release was accompanied by a marketing campaign supported by First Peoples Digital.

== Reception ==
Reception

Aggregate scores
Aggregator	Score
Metacritic	(PC) 82/100
OpenCritic	87% recommend

The Vale: Shadow of the Crown received "generally favorable reviews", according to review aggregator Metacritic. Fellow review aggregator OpenCritic assessed that the game received strong approval, being recommended by 87% of critics. RPGamer said it is a "fresh and unique gaming experience" that is "absolutely worth the time". Paste called it a "top-tier experience" for blind gamers and "novel enough to be genuinely refreshing" for sighted players. RPGFan, which made it an Editor's Choice, said it is "an incredibly immersive RPG" and praised the sound direction, story, and characters. In a roundup of games that Polygon felt had advanced accessibility issues in 2021, they called The Vale: Shadow of the Crown "a brilliant RPG" that brings gameplay from audio games to wider audiences.

It was nominated for Innovation in Accessibility at The Game Awards 2021, won Best Video Game Narrative at the 10th Canadian Screen Awards, and received an honorable mention for Excellence in Audio at the 24th Annual Independent Games Festival Awards.
