= Halcyon 6 =

2016 video game

Halcyon 6: Starbase Commander
- Developer: Massive Damage
- Publisher: Massive Damage
- Directors: Ken Seto; Linda Tran
- Producers: Garry Seto; Peter McLaren
- Designers: Ken Seto; Garry Seto; Peter McLaren
- Artists: Bryan Heemskerk; Juan Carlos Solon
- Writers: Peter McLaren; Kenneth Hook
- Composer: Stephen London
- Platforms: Linux, OS X, Windows, iOS
- Release: Linux, OS X, Windows; September 8, 2016; iOS; October 19, 2017
- Genres: Strategy, Turn-based tactical, RPG
- Mode: Single-player

Halcyon 6: Starbase Commander is a strategy video game and turn-based tactical RPG hybrid developed and published by Massive Damage. It was released on September 8, 2016 for Windows, OS X and Linux, and October 19, 2017 for iOS. Taking place in a science fiction setting, the player must reclaim and rebuild the derelict ancient space station Halcyon 6 in order to stop an impending alien invasion of Earth.

The game received mixed reviews from critics, praising the game's concept but criticizing its slow progression. This caused the game's developers to release an enhanced version, Lightspeed Edition, which decreased the game's length significantly, in addition to adding new features.

== Gameplay ==
The game revolves around managing and building the player's base, which has individual rooms that must be cleared out. To do this the player must gather resources from nearby worlds. They must also deal with attacking enemies such as pirates and aliens entering through portals that must be closed. There are two types of combat, ground and ship-to-ship, both of which operate in the manner of a turn-based RPG. The player can use combos to exploit vulnerabilities and apply status effects.

== Development ==
Halcyon 6 was funded on Kickstarter, where its initial budget was USD $40,000. It ended up making almost $200,000 due to coverage from large gaming sites and promotional assistance from Square Enix Collective. The developers emulated the successful marketing campaigns of Darkest Dungeon and Moon Hunters. Its development team was based in Toronto.

The game was inspired by the setting of Star Trek, and by the gameplay of Master of Orion, Jagged Alliance, and Star Control. Its base-building gameplay also took inspiration from XCOM: Enemy Unknown. Combining the individual systems of different genres was stated to be difficult, with the developers going through "5 or 6" different combat systems. Each aspect of the game was assigned to a different developer.

In 2017, the game's developers released Halcyon 6: Lightspeed Edition, which fixed aspects that were criticized about the original game. This included a sped-up and "streamlined" campaign, slightly increased difficulty and improved combat and UI. It was released for free as a separate game to owners of the original.

== Reception ==
Reception

Aggregate score
| Aggregator | Score |
|---|---|
| Metacritic | PC: 71/100; PC (Lightspeed Edition): 73/100 |

Halcyon 6 received mixed reviews, with an aggregate score of 71/100 on Metacritic.

Adam Smith of Rock, Paper, Shotgun called the game enjoyable, but "less than the sum of its parts", saying that its mixture of gameplay genres "don't quite fit" with each other. He described the game's aliens as "dangerous [...] but also kind of adorable", saying that "Halcyon makes cosmic horror cute". Jason Bohn of Hardcore Gamer rated the game 4/5, calling it "one of those titles that cannot be recommended enough to fans of 4X games, JRPGs or space-based science fiction", despite "a few small details holding it back". Kat Bailey of USgamer rated the game 60/100, calling it "flawed but promising", praising the game's overall concept and calling its soundtrack "phenomenal", but criticizing its "tedious resource gathering, repetitive combat, and bugs".
