= Sunday Gold =

- Developer: BKOM Studios
- Publisher: Team17
- Platform: Windows
- Release: WW: October 13, 2022
- Genres: Adventure, tactical role-playing
- Mode: Single-player

Sunday Gold is a video game developed by BKOM Studios and published by Team17 in 2022. It combines gameplay from point-and-click adventure games and tactical role-playing games.

== Gameplay ==
Players control a trio of London-based criminals planning a heist against a corrupt corporation in a dystopian future. Sunday Gold blends the puzzles and minigames of point-and-click adventure games with the turn-based combat of tactical role-playing games. Each of the playable characters has a specialty that leads to a unique minigame: Frank can pick locks, Gavin can hack computers, and Sally can perform feats of strength. While infiltrating, interacting with objects outside of combat is also turn-based. Characters may move freely, but each interaction with an object costs action points, which are replenished each turn. After players end their turn, security teams may investigate and attack the trio. Any characters who have exhausted their action points can not act until the next turn. Besides health, characters must manage their composure, a measure of morale and mental health. Losing composure can cause characters to panic and act without player input.

== Development ==
Team17 released the Windows version on October 13, 2022.

== Reception ==
Sunday Gold received mixed reviews on Metacritic. RPGamer found both the adventure and role-playing parts to be average but recommended the game to people looking for a hybrid. Adventure Gamers called it "a bold, flashy experiment" and praised its shakeup of traditional adventure gameplay. PC Gamer described Sunday Gold as "a successful proof-of-concept" that, while not as revolutionary some other recent adventure-RPG hybrids, excels in its tactical combat. Rock Paper Shotgun's reviewer enjoyed the tactical combat at first but eventually found it to be a slog that interrupted the fun puzzles.
