= Wytchwood =

2021 video game

- Developer(s): Alientrap
- Publisher(s): Whitethorn Games; Whisper Games
- Programmer(s): Lee Vermeulen
- Artist(s): Jesse McGibney
- Engine: Unity
- Platform(s): Nintendo Switch; PlayStation 4; PlayStation 5; Windows; Xbox One; Xbox Series X/S; Android; iOS
- Release: Windows, Switch, PS4, PS5, Xbox One, Xbox Series X/S; December 9, 2021; Android, iOS; February 8, 2024
- Genre(s): Adventure
- Mode(s): Single-player

Wytchwood is an adventure video game developed by Alientrap and published by Whitethorn Games and Whisper Games for Nintendo Switch, PlayStation 4, PlayStation 5, Windows, Xbox One, Xbox Series X/S, Android, and iOS. The game was released on December 9, 2021.

== Gameplay ==
Wytchwood is a crafting adventure game set in an expressive land of gothic fables and fairytales. As the mysterious old witch of the woods, players explore a strange countryside, collect magical ingredients, brew sorcerous enchantments, and pass twisted judgement upon a capricious cast of characters and creatures.

== Reception ==
Reception

Aggregate score
Aggregator	Score
Metacritic	78/100

Review score
Publication	Score
Nintendo Life	7/10

Wytchwood received positive reviews on Metacritic. Writing for Rock Paper Shotgun, Alice Bell wrote "A dark fairy-tale to-do list that takes full advantage of its premise and has a lot of fun with it. You'll fall in love with Wytchwood's no-nonsense crone." In her review for Eurogamer, Malindy Hetfeld said she enjoyed her first 10 hours playing the game, but the crafting began to feel like busy work. Though he criticized the game's pacing, Nintendo Life's reviewer, Ollie Reynolds, called Wytchwood "a relaxing and addictive jaunt into the world of crafting".
