= Clan O'Conall and the Crown of the Stag =

- Developer: HitGrab
- Publisher: HitGrab
- Engine: Unity
- Platforms: Windows, Nintendo Switch
- Release: April 27, 2021
- Genre: Action platformer
- Mode: Single-player

Clan O'Conall and the Crown of the Stag is an indie action platformer video game developed and published by HitGrab and released on for Windows on April 27, 2021 and Nintendo Switch on June 2, 2022. It allows players to switch between three siblings as they battle to retrieve the Crown of the Stag from a demon. The game received praise from critics for its art style and gameplay. However, its story was less well-received, and some critics noted that the game was on the short side.

== Plot ==
The game is based on Celtic mythology from the first millennium, taking place in Hibernia. The player controls one of the three O'Conall siblings, Haggish, Kilcannon, or Clakshot. Chief Ardan was kidnapped by Caoranach, mother of demons, who also stole the Crown of the Stag in order to incite a war between mortals and the Fae, or fairy-folk.

== Reception ==
The game received an aggregate score of 78/100 on Metacritic, indicating "generally favorable reviews".

Lisa Pollifroni of Checkpoint Gaming rated the game 9/10 points, calling the game's art "beautiful", and also praising the character-swapping mechanic. However, she also stated that the "story takes a backseat", and called some of the mechanics "a bit fiddly", such as Clakshot's hook grapple.

James Ward of Gamereactor rated the game 8/10 points, calling it a "wonderful action platformer" that remained exciting from beginning to end, particularly praising its hand-drawn art style as unique. However, he called the game's story "weak and forgettable". Euisik Moon of IGN Korea also rated the game 8/10 points, saying that despite the game being short, it was well-balanced with each character being given equal time. He called it "a satisfying game with dense platformer action". However, he opined that he wished there was more to do after finishing it.
