= Steve Saylor =

Canadian game and media critic

Steve Saylor is a Canadian based game and media critic, host of Blind Gamer with Steve Saylor, and consultant that looks at accessibility within gaming. He is known for his YouTube and Twitch channel, along with having worked on the accessibility aspects of games such as The Last of Us Part II, Assassin's Creed Valhalla and Watch Dogs: Legion.

== Life and career ==
Saylor was born with albinism and nystagmus, a condition that causes involuntary eye movement. He created and is the host of the Blind Gamer series on YouTube, which involves him playing video games while discussing accessibility in the medium, along with larger discourse on ableism and disability.

Steve Saylor has appeared in numerous publications, including Kinda Funny, and has been covered in Vice Media, CG Magazine, BBC Radio, and CNN, and has written articles for IGN. He is also an Accessibility Advocate that has spoken at GAconf, and was nominated for the 2021 Canadian Game Awards.
