= Elsewhere Electric =

Virtual reality video game

- Developer: Games by Stitch
- Publisher: Games by Stitch
- Engine: Unity
- Platforms: Meta Quest, SteamVR, iOS, Android
- Release: July 23, 2025
- Genres: Puzzle, Asymmetric Co-op
- Mode: Multiplayer

Elsewhere Electric is a 2025 asymmetric cooperative puzzle video game developed by the Canadian indie studio Games by Stitch in partnership with the Canada Media Fund and Ontario Creates. Designed for two players – one using a virtual reality (VR) headset and the other a mobile device – the game emphasizes teamwork, environmental storytelling, and non-linear puzzle-solving. It released on July 23, 2025.

== Gameplay ==
In Elsewhere Electric, players assume the roles of the "Installer" (VR player) and the "Operator" (mobile player). The Installer explores a mysterious facility, interacting with puzzles and navigating hazards, while the Operator assists remotely via surveillance tools, schematics, and an evolving symbolic interface.

The game features:

- Asymmetric two-player gameplay
- Environmental and symbol-based puzzles
- A unique communication mechanic between VR and mobile players
- A limited energy resource used by the Installer and monitored by the Operator, which powers doors, lights, and systems
- Creatures and hazards requiring coordinated response and planning

== Development ==
Elsewhere Electric is developed by Games by Stitch, based in Toronto, Ontario. The project has received support from the Canada Media Fund, Ontario Creates, and the Government of Canada. The development team draws creative inspiration from retro-futuristic aesthetics of the 1970s and 1980s, with a focus on tactile analog technology and vintage institutional design.

The game was officially announced on March 20, 2025, during the Future Games Show Spring Showcase. The July 23 release date was announced during the UploadVR Showcase Summer 2025 on July 11, 2025.

== Platforms ==
The game is expected to launch on the following platforms:

- Meta Quest (VR)
- SteamVR
- iOS
- Android

The mobile version is currently available as a free companion app to support asymmetric multiplayer gameplay.

== Reception ==
Elsewhere Electric was well received by early beta testers and the press prior to its release. UploadVR praised the game’s creative approach to asymmetry, noting its “curiously unsettling co-op puzzle mystery” and its appeal to both seasoned VR users and non-VR players alike, while Mobile Syrup praised the game as "one of the most unique co-op games in a while" in its preview. VR publication MIXED compared the game's asymmetric mechanics favorably to Covert.

The game was also featured as one of Kotaku's list of notable reveals from the Future Games Show 2025 Spring Showcase.

In his review of Elsewhere Electric, UploadVR's Henry Stockdale praised the game as a "compelling co-op mystery worth exploring, featuring some clever escape room puzzles that equally intrigue and challenge." The review also noted the game's "effectively tense atmospheric design" as a selling point.
