= Rockets Rockets Rockets =

2015 video game

- Logo for Rockets Rockets Rockets
- Developer: Radial Games
- Publisher: Radial Games
- Platforms: Microsoft Windows, OS X, Linux, PlayStation 4, Nintendo Switch
- Release: Microsoft Windows, OS X, Linux, PlayStation 4; 2015; Nintendo Switch: WW: 15 November 2018
- Genres: Action, casual, sports, strategy
- Modes: Single-player, multiplayer

Rockets Rockets Rockets (stylized as ROCKETSROCKETSROCKETS) is a game created by Radial Games and was released in 2015. The game was released for Microsoft Windows, macOS, Linux, PlayStation 4, and Nintendo Switch.

== Gameplay ==
Rockets Rockets Rockets is set in a 2D world where the player controls a rocket while attacking and being attacked by AI and human controlled enemies. The aim of the game is to try to get a three point lead against your enemy. The game contains power-ups and different environments.
