= Desert Golfing =

2014 video game

- Developer: Blinkbat Games
- Publisher: Blinkbat Games
- Designer: Justin Smith
- Platforms: Windows, macOS, iOS, Android
- Release: iOS, Android; August 6, 2014; Windows, macOS; December 19, 2017
- Genre: Sports
- Mode: Single-player

Desert Golfing is a minimalist golf video game developed and published by Canadian indie studio Blinkbat Games, designed by Justin Smith, and released on August 6, 2014, for iOS and Android, and on December 19, 2017, for Windows and macOS. It received a positive reception from critics for its addictive gameplay and simplicity. In July 2020, Smith, now operating under the studio name Captain Games, released a follow-up titled Golf on Mars, featuring new control options and course generation variety.

== Gameplay ==
The game takes place in an endless side-scrolling desert, where the player can shoot a golf ball using a one finger swipe to determine direction and power. The entirety of the "golf course" is made of sand, making the physics of the golf ball more difficult to predict and control, as if from a bunker. The goal is to make the golf ball reach each hole in the fewest shots, but when this happens the game continues with a new, pseudorandomly generated course. Therefore, the game seemingly never ends, and the score is ultimately solely dependent on how long the player plays the game.

== Development ==
The setting of Desert Golfing was inspired by the mention of Journey in a Gamasutra article about art games and their penchant for making walking simulators. The game's creator, Justin Smith, said that while those types of games bored him, he thought it would be interesting to make such a game with a more immediate challenge. He also compared it to the game Desert Bus. Smith stated that he did not realize people would be so invested in the game and would have put more thought into making the later holes more different if he had known, or adding a true ending.

Each hole in the game is procedurally generated, but with human orchestrated constraints that slowly introduce new gameplay aspects, as well as environmental features and color palette changes, possibly representing a day-night cycle, as the game goes on. The holes after 2000+ become harder and used to be impossible at some point, giving the game an unintentional ending. The game has since been updated to prevent the random generation of impossible holes, and to eventually have an ending on hole 10,001.

== Reception ==
Tom Bramwell of Eurogamer rated the game 9/10 and gave it the "Recommended" award, calling it "wonderfully sparse" and "an art game take on [...] mobile sports rubbish". He called the control and physics "superb", and said that it succeeded equally well as an art game and as a fun video game.

Alessandro Zampini of IGN Italia also rated the game 90/100, saying that it is "magnetic, minimalist and ruthless".

Kyle Orland of Ars Technica called the game "addictive" and said that it achieves "transcendent beauty". Brendan Keogh called the game "majestic", "restrained and confident".
