= Sissy's Magical Ponycorn Adventure =

2011 video game

- Gameplay of Sissy's Magical Ponycorn Adventure
- Developer: Untold Entertainment Inc.
- Publisher: Untold Entertainment Inc.
- Designers: Ryan Henson Creighton, Cassie Creighton
- Engine: UGAGS
- Platforms: World Wide Web, iPad, BlackBerry PlayBook
- Release: May 24, 2011
- Genre: Graphic adventure game
- Mode: Single-player

Sissy's Magical Ponycorn Adventure is a 2011 indie graphic adventure game developed by Untold Entertainment Inc. founder Ryan Creighton and illustrated and voiced by his then-five-year-old daughter Cassie Creighton. It was released as a browser game on computers, and later released on the iPad and BlackBerry PlayBook. The game follows the titular character Sissy, voiced by Cassie, as she searches for fictional creatures called Ponycorns, a portmanteau of the words pony and unicorn. Cassie drew the artwork at the Toronto Game Jam. Ryan then integrated the art into the Untold Graphic Adventure Game System (UGAGS) that the game uses. The game received positive reception for its cute appearance, Cassie's ambitious design, and her voice acting.

== Gameplay and premise ==
Sissy's Magical Ponycorn Adventure is a graphic adventure game where players control Sissy by clicking on parts of the setting to point to her where to move. if players click on certain objects or characters, she will examine or speak to them. The game tasks players to solve puzzles in order to progress. Sissy is able to explore other areas by examining rainbows, which act as doorways. The game uses simple animation as well as characters and settings that are entirely drawn with crayon.

The story begins with Sissy stating her favorite things are half-pony half-unicorn hybrids called Ponycorns. She meets a person named Orange Boy, who gives Sissy five jars to store Ponycorns that she finds. She helps Ponycorns out of various situations, such as an evil lemon holding one hostage. Once she has found four Ponycorns, she discovers that Orange Boy was secretly a Ponycorn who was testing her to see if she was kind, and allows her to put him in a jar as well.

== Development ==
Sissy's Magical Ponycorn Adventure was designed by Ryan Creighton and his then-five-year-old daughter Cassie Creighton under Ryan's company Untold Entertainment Inc. Ryan was responsible for developing the game and voicing non-playable characters, while Cassie voiced Sissy, drew the art, created the non-playable characters, and designed some of the puzzles. Ryan wanted to make a game that had a broad appeal, including people who do not play video games. Ryan, a veteran designer of children's video games, brought Cassie with him to the Toronto Game Jam with the intent of allowing her to develop her first video game. On her first day at the Game Jam, she did six hours of coloring. She later did an hour's worth of voice acting at home. Ryan took her drawings and integrated them into the Untold Graphic Adventure Game System. It took about two days to finish. The game's website has ads that play before the game loads, and a PayPal button to donate money to Cassie's college fund. Sissy's Magical Ponycorn Adventure was released on May 24, 2011. It was released as a browser game on computers and later on the iPad and BlackBerry PlayBook.

The game as hosted on the official website is currently not playable as it depended on Adobe Flash Player and the AWS hosting of the game file has expired. The iPad version was not updated for modern versions of iOS. However, it can easily be played on a browser that still has Flash installed, or using Ruffle.

== Reception ==
Sissy's Magical Ponycorn Adventure has received significant praise for its design and Cassie's ambition to make a video game. The websites for the game and the Toronto Game Jam went down on its release due to heavy traffic. It became popular in part because of a number of Twitter messages from people in the industry about it, such as independent designers Anna Anthropy and Erin Robinson, journalist Mathew Kumar, graphic adventure game developer Ron Gilbert, and International Games Festival chair Brandon Boyer. The donations received for Cassie's educational fund have exceeded $3000.

Stephen Johnson for G4TV wrote that it won their heart while Luke Plunkett for Kotaku called it "incredibly sweet." A writer for Indie Games praised the puzzles, images, voice acting, and concept, calling them all adorable. They felt that an adult would not be able to make something like this. Mark Serrells for Kotaku Australia felt that the game may be the most adorable game ever, comparing it to a combination between webcomic Axe Cop and The Smurfs. Alex Navarro for Giant Bomb also compared it to Axe Cop, noting influences such as My Little Pony and Pokémon. They praised the voice work and the game's sense of imagination. Staff for The Escapist, Rock, Paper, Shotgun, Yahoo! Games, and GameSetWatch all found the game extremely cute. Lewis Denby for PC Gamer felt that it was a decent game in its own right and not merely a cute one with an interesting history. Doug Aamoth for Time called it an example of "the good parts of the Internet." Jaime Woo for Torontoist felt that the game derived its quality from Cassie's "childhood innocence" and creativity. He felt that another contributing factor to its quality was her gender, which offered an uncommon perspective in the industry. The game was honored as a finalist at IndieCade 2011, where it was nominated for the "Community Impact Award". In 2011, Cassie Creighton was named by Glen Farrelly of the magazine Backbone as one of the top 15 Canadians in Digital Media.

A stage based on the game was featured in the PC game They Bleed Pixels.
