= Super Stickman Golf =

2011 video game

- App icon
- Developer: Noodlecake Games
- Publisher: Noodlecake Games
- Platforms: iOS, Android, Roku
- Release: June 7, 2011

Super Stickman Golf is a 2011 golf simulation video game developed by the Canadian studio Noodlecake Games and released for iOS and Android devices on June 7, 2011, and Roku devices in December. A sequel entitled Super Stickman Golf 2 was later released on March 14, 2013. Following the success of the first two iterations, Noodlecake Games released Super Stickman Golf 3 on July 6, 2016. This new version included a new game mechanic where players could put spin on their shot, as well as new power-ups and hats. The Android version of Super Stickman Golf 3 was removed from Google Play in 2021.

== Reception ==
Each of the Super Stickman Golf apps has received critical acclaim. The A.V. Club gave Super Stickman Golf an A, describing it as "A no-nonsense hybrid of a platformer and a golf sim that manages to be the rare iOS game with staying power". Level7.nu rated the game 9/10, writing "Lots of tracks, great controls, fun superpowers, engaging leaderboards and great multiplayer. This is one of my favorite iPhone games of all time." Eurogamer gave the game 8 out of 10, saying "So even if golf brings out your inner chainsaw-wielding Alf Garnett, face your demons with this playful physics-based catharsis."

Super Stickman Golf 2 has a Metacritic score of 87 out of 100 based on 16 critics, indicating "generally favorable reviews".

Super Stickman Golf 3 received the Metacritic award for iOS Game of the Year in 2016, having a score of 95 out of 100 based on seven critics, indicating "universal acclaim".
