= Monster Loves You! =

2013 video game

- Publisher: Radical Games
- Designer: Dejobaan Games
- Platform: PC
- Release: 2013
- Genre: Visual novel

Monster Loves You! is a 2013 visual novel developed by Boston-based studio Dejobaan Games. It was released on March 18, 2013.

== Overview ==
Players begin the game as a "Morsel", a tiny blob floating in a vat with other morsels. As they progress through the game and grow up into a monster, the player makes a series of story choices. These affect the game's narrative, the type of monster the player becomes, and how other monsters react to them.

Players can choose to embark on different "adventures" within the game by clicking icons. Each icon provides a subtle hint regarding the adventure's purpose although no description is provided until the player begins it. The players choices influence their monsters stats in one of five personality traits: ferocity, bravery, honesty, kindness, and cleverness. In addition to selecting choices from a menu, many outcomes in the game are determined by RPG dice rolls. The monster's personality is easiest to change during childhood and adolescence, but does not change much during adulthood outside of major decisions.

The player's actions also determines how the player character is perceived by humans in the game. The game has a total of fifteen alternate endings determined by the player's choices. At the end of the game, the player character is tested based on these stats.

== Reception ==
Reception

Review scores
Publication	Score
Destructoid	6.5/10
Eurogamer	7/10
IGN	6/10
Pocket Gamer	2/5

The game received mixed reviews from critics. IGN Greece gave the game a score of 6, criticizing its uneven tone and the fact that visual novels lack depth. Alasdair Duncan of Destructoid gave the game a 6.5 score, noting that it was high on charm and suitable for children. Gamezebo gave it 70 out of 100. Pocket Gamer gave it 2 out of 5 stars. Eurogamer.pl gave the game 7 out of 10.

== See also ==
- Monster Loves You! at MobyGames
