= Death Road to Canada =

2016 video game

- Developers: Rocketcat Games, Madgarden
- Publisher: Rocketcat Games (Note: Published by Noodlecake Games for iOS and Android and Ukiyo Publishing for Nintendo Switch, PlayStation 4, and Xbox One.)
- Platforms: Microsoft Windows; OS X Linux iOS; Android; Nintendo Switch; PlayStation 4 Xbox One
- Release: Windows, OS X, Linux; July 21, 2016 iOS; March 22, 2017; Android; October 26, 2017; Switch, PS4, Xbox One; May 8, 2018
- Genres: Action-adventure, roguelike
- Modes: Single-player, multiplayer

Death Road to Canada is a 2016 roguelike video game developed by Madgarden and Rocketcat Games. The game was also published by Rocketcat. Set during a zombie apocalypse, the player attempts to guide a group of survivors from Florida to "the last zombie-free nation" of Canada. The game released for Microsoft Windows, OS X, and Linux on July 22, 2016, with later releases for iOS, Android, Nintendo Switch, PlayStation 4, and Xbox One.

== Gameplay ==
A zombie apocalypse has killed billions and shattered world civilization. However, the zombies are incapable of functioning in sufficiently cold weather. A group of survivors, each with different skills, attempts to drive from Florida to Canada in hopes of finding safety.

Gameplay consists of two parts: exploration, in which the group moves through buildings searching for supplies and fighting zombies; and text-based events, where the player must choose a response to problems and receive bonuses or penalties. A character's morale must also be managed; it can be raised or lowered through events and through running out of supplies. A character that runs out of morale will cause problems for the group. Occasionally the group will encounter "sieges," where they must survive a growing zombie horde for a set amount of time. Surviving a siege earns "Zombo Points," which can be spent on permanent upgrades for future journeys.

The journey north lasts 9 to 999 in-game days depending on the difficulty level. At the end, the survivors must reach the Canadian border while pursued by a massive horde of zombies. There they are met by Mounties and a Justin Trudeau-lookalike, who easily defeat the zombies, congratulate the group and grant them Canadian citizenship.

== Development ==
The studio's previous game, Wayward Souls, released in 2014, and following that, development on Death Road to Canada began. Kepa Auwae of Rocketcat Games, one of the game's developers, said, "The story is a humorous take on how America sees Canada, as thought up by someone that lives in Kitchener." The story was also influenced by the goofiness of the zombie genre, and the possibilities of randomly generated storytelling. It was the studio's first game to launch first on PC, in order to not have to balance making the game profitable for mobile, and making sure it was fun for players, wanting to avoid making it free-to-play. The developer commented "How free-to-play games work is that you're counting on people to get annoyed, and then having to pay to reduce their annoyance". Zombies were intended to be slow, but could do enough damage so that large hordes of them could overwhelm the player. The text interludes were added to provide an opportunity for each of the characters' personalities to come out. Rocketcat took inspiration from what Auwae called "the unintentionally funny parts of the Walking Dead," and George Romero. Over the course of development, text events and the action gameplay had equal priority at one point, but over time it shifted to focusing more on the action gameplay. Since its initial release in 2016, the game has continued to be updated and supported by the developers.

The gameplay logic is in a scripting language based on the Forth (programming language), called DEATHFORTH. This has allowed the community to mod the game in various ways.

== Reception ==
Reception

Aggregate scores
Aggregator	Score
Metacritic	PC: 73/100 iOS: 91/100; PS4: 78/100; XONE: 77/100; NS: 79/100
OpenCritic	74% recommend

Review scores
Publication	Score
Destructoid	8/10
Nintendo Life	7/10
Nintendo World Report	7/10
PlayStation Official Magazine – UK	7/10
Pocket Gamer	7/10
TouchArcade	5/5

Death Road to Canada received "generally favorable" reviews according to the review aggregation website Metacritic. Fellow review aggregator OpenCritic assessed that the game received strong approval, being recommended by 74% of critics.

Destructoid praised the music, calling it "chirpy, contagious, and memorable." The reviewer criticized the randomness that the game could have, "the RNG feels capable of viciously screwing you over from time to time without recourse." Nintendo Life liked the world of Death Road to Canada, writing that the game "allows fans of the zombie genre to live out their ultimate survival fantasies again and again," while disliking the repetitiveness of the game, saying "the patterns and outcomes may become a little too predictable for the average player." Pocket Gamer felt that the gameplay contributed to making the game a "beautifully clammy, scratchy gem."

Neal Ronaghan of Nintendo World Report enjoyed the character creation: "It's fun making characters, and having the ability to upgrade the different archetypes ... means you can have a little bit of an advantage to start the trek." Ronaghan disliked the randomness of Death Road, feeling that it made character decisions pointless: "The brutal, random nature too often made me feel like I had little agency in my quest." TouchArcade liked the survival elements of the game, as the reviewer wrote "Death Road to Canada nails the struggle of trying to survive."
