= Papo & Yo =

2012 video game

- Developer: Minority Media
- Publisher: Minority Media
- Designer: Vander Caballero
- Composer: Brian D'Oliveira
- Engine: Unreal Engine 3
- Platforms: PlayStation 3, Microsoft Windows, OS X, Linux
- Release: August 14, 2012: PlayStation 3; NA: August 14, 2012; PAL: August 15, 2012; Windows; April 18, 2013; OS X, Linux; WW: January 7, 2014 (Humble Bundle X); WW: July 1, 2015 (Steam)
- Genres: Adventure, puzzle
- Mode: Single-player

Papo & Yo is an adventure video game developed and published by Minority Media for the PlayStation 3. It was originally released on August 14, 2012 on the PlayStation Network and since April 18, 2013 on Microsoft Windows through Steam. It was released on January 7, 2014 on OS X and Linux through the Humble Indie Bundle X, and on July 1, 2015 via Steam. The game involves a young South-American boy Quico who, while hiding from his abusive, alcoholic father, finds himself taken to a dream-like favela, and meeting a normally docile creature, Monster. The player, as Quico, can interact with Monster and manipulate the buildings of the favela in unique ways, such as by stacking individual shacks on each other, to complete puzzles and progress in the game. Papo & Yo was designed by Vander Caballero, who created the story based on his own past in dealing with an abusive, alcoholic father.

== Gameplay ==
The game takes place in an unspecified South-American favela which the player has to navigate. The player takes on the role of Quico, a young boy who has run away from his home to escape his abusive and alcoholic father. Quico has the ability to turn the environment into a magical and dream-like world. For example, tugging a glowing thread can pull a stairway out of the side of a building, lifting a cardboard box can cause an entire building to come unmoored from its foundations, shacks can sprout legs and scuttle into place to provide a handy bridge. According to Ars Technica's website "there's a sense of childlike imagination at play in the way the game adds a layer of magic into the rundown world, and it's likely to make you look at your own surroundings a little differently after you play".

One of the key elements of the game is Monster, a giant that Quico discovers while navigating through the slums. Monster at first appears to be very kind and helpful. He can be made to hold down pressure plates and his belly can be used as a super-trampoline to reach rooftops. Monster has an addiction for eating frogs and if he eats one he becomes a fiery, raging beast that will damage anything around him, even Quico if he cannot get away quickly enough. The player can use a fruit to calm him.

== Plot ==
Quico is a young boy that has been abused by his alcoholic father. While hiding in his closet during one of his father's drunken rages, clutching his favorite toy, a robot doll named Lula, Quico discovers a strange chalk mark on the wall, and touching it, finds himself taken to a dream-like world. There, a young girl named Alejandra initially sees Quico as a threat, but comes to be a guide. Lula also becomes animated and helps guide Quico through the world.

Quico eventually comes upon a giant lumbering creature, simply known as Monster. Alejandra and Lula warn Quico about the dangers of Monster, but Quico finds the creature docile and playful. However, when Monster eats a frog, it becomes enraged, chasing after Quico until he can calm it with a rotten fruit. They proceed through the dream world, but during one episode when Monster is enraged, it damages Lula. Alejandra directs Quico to a temple where they can use the anger from Monster to revive Lula, but this requires luring the creature into giant traps meant to hurt it. Quico completes this task, and Lula is successfully revived, but the three are now chased by Monster. Alejandra is eventually caught and eaten by Monster, but not before she directs Quico to go to the Shaman to help cure the Monster.

During these scenes, there are brief periods where Quico awakes in a dream and witnesses a past memory: that of his father accidentally running over a person with his car in a dark rainstorm. One such scene shows his father's shadow as that of Monster.

Quico guides Monster to a sky-tram like device but Lula is forced to stay behind to operate it. The tram ends at the Shaman, but Quico finds there is no Shaman, only the memories of his father, and showing that he had fallen into his alcoholic and abusive state after the accident; Monster represents Quico's imagination of his father, while the frogs are a substitute for his father's alcoholism. A voice warns him that Monster cannot be cured and Quico must let him go. After calming Monster to sleep, Quico reluctantly pushes Monster into an abyss, and then follows a path that returns him back to his closet in the real world.

== Development ==
Announced on June 3, 2011 at the Electronic Entertainment Expo (E3), the game marked the debut release for Montreal-based studio Minority. Development of Papo & Yo was supported by Sony's Pub Fund scheme, which provides financial support to small-scale developers. The game was developed using Epic Games's Unreal Engine 3.

Papo & Yo was released on the PlayStation Network on August 14, 2012 as part of the second annual PlayStation Network (PSN) Play promotion.

== Soundtrack ==
Developer Minority announced a soundtrack release (composed by Brian D'Oliveira) on PSN in a blog post, with a scheduled release date of December 18, 2012 in North America and one day later for Europe.

It is available on digital distributors such as the PlayStation Network, iTunes Store, Amazon, Steam, SoundCloud, etc.

== Reception ==
Reception

Aggregate score
Aggregator	Score	
Aggregator	PC	PS3
Metacritic	70/100	72/100

Review scores
Publication	Score	
Publication	PC	PS3
Adventure Gamers	N/A	3.5/5
Destructoid	N/A	8.5/10
Eurogamer	N/A	8/10
Game Informer	N/A	8/10
GameSpot	7.5/10	7.5/10
GameTrailers	N/A	8/10
Gamezebo	4/5	N/A
Giant Bomb	N/A	3/5
IGN	4/10	4/10
Joystiq	N/A	3.5/5
PC Gamer (UK)	70%	N/A
Polygon	N/A	5/10
PlayStation: The Official Magazine	N/A	9/10
VentureBeat	N/A	80/100
Digital Spy	3/5	N/A
The Escapist	N/A	4/5

Papo & Yo received "mixed or average reviews" according to the review aggregation website Metacritic.

Digital Spy gave the PC version three stars out of five, saying, "It's a fairly short title, though, lasting only a few hours, and despite the parts surrounding the narrative being underwhelming, the story itself is impressively affecting and worth experiencing." The Escapist gave the PlayStation 3 version four stars out of five, saying, "Papo & Yo isn't always pleasant, for reasons both technical and emotional, but its cleverness is exceptional. It's a world of pure imagination, for good and for ill, and while its puzzles aren't the most challenging you'll find, their presentation is so unusual that you'll race through them just to see what comes next." However, Wired gave the same console version seven stars out of ten, saying that it "Never feels challenging, so it lacks exhilarating highs."

EGMNow gave the PlayStation 3 version 8.5 out of 10, saying, "The daring, deeply personal story is more than enough reason to give Papo & Yo a shot, but don't expect to be wowed by the underlying puzzle platformer gameplay." GameZone gave the PlayStation and PC versions each eight out of ten, saying that the former version "does not sound like the best platformer out there, but it carries a deeper meaning than you might expect"; and later saying of the latter, "You can get through Papo & Yo in about four hours or so. Some may find extra incentive to return to this magical quest, while others are likely to enjoy a single run. The game is certainly not for everyone, especially when you take into consideration the overly simple nature of the puzzles and modest design. Still, those who do play the game and take in its personal, emotional, and saddening plot will get a glimpse of something truly special and thought-provoking." PCMag gave the PC version four stars out of five, saying, "Papo & Yo, ultimately, is worth the time to invest, and the game's tackling of issues that overshadow the gameplay itself are admirable and well-executed. It's like a Pixar movie or a classic storybook in video game form, and even though it may not be the most engaging platform-puzzler out there, it still is a pleasure to listen to, watch, and play." However, Push Square gave the PlayStation 3 version seven stars out of ten, saying that it was "not a technically perfect game, and is perhaps a little short for the asking price, but it covers a topic that is rarely discussed in the world of video games thoughtfully with an inventive style that provokes an emotional response at several points." Edge gave the same console version four out of ten, saying, "Should a game about surviving an alcoholic, abusive parent be fun? Probably not. But it gains nothing from being wearying and frustrating."
