= Melatonin (video game) =

2022 video game

- Developer: Half Asleep Games
- Publisher: Half Asleep Games
- Director: David Huynh
- Engine: Unity
- Platforms: macOS, Nintendo Switch, Windows, PlayStation 5
- Release: macOS, Nintendo Switch, Windows; December 15, 2022; PlayStation 5; March 12, 2024
- Genre: Rhythm
- Mode: Single-player

Melatonin is a 2022 rhythm video game released by indie developer Half Asleep for Windows, macOS, Nintendo Switch, and PlayStation 5.

It received positive reviews and was praised for its art style and music, with criticism directed towards its short length.

== Gameplay ==
Melatonin is a rhythm game that takes place in a dream world of an unnamed male protagonist with 20 levels. Unlike a traditional rhythm game, it lacks overlays, relying instead on visual and auditory cues. The minigames, which are similar to those found in the Rhythm Heaven games, are played against Lo-fi music.

In addition to its main game, the game has a level editor to create new minigames.

== Development and release ==
Melatonin was developed by Canadian developer David Huynh, who had previously worked in graphic design. Announced in Wholesome Game's 2022 Summer game fest, It was first released for the Nintendo Switch and Steam on December 15, 2022.

A version for the PlayStation 5 was released on March 12th, 2024. In addition, the game's soundtrack was released on vinyl, in a two part LP, by the company iam8bit.

== Reception ==
Reception

Aggregate score
Aggregator	Score
Metacritic	Switch: 87/100; PC: 77/100

Review scores
Publication	Score
Nintendo Life	7/10
TouchArcade	4.5/5

According to Metacritic, both the Switch and PC versions of Melatonin were given "Generally Favorable" reviews.

Hardcore Gamer's review praised the graphics and gameplay, describing it as "Cleverly-orchestrated, if sadly a little on the abrupt side due to its short run-time". Game Rant praised the music and gameplay, but criticized the difficulty and the short length. Nintendo Life praised the aesthetic and accessibility options, but criticized the short length and difficulty, saying "It doesn't fill the Rhythm Heaven-shaped hole in the Switch's portfolio, but instead it creates a dreamy new space filled with cotton candy colour, energy, and, most importantly, fun."
