= Waveform (video game) =

2012 video game

- Developer: Eden Industries
- Publisher: Eden Industries
- Platforms: Windows, OS X, Linux
- Release: March 20, 2012
- Genre: Action
- Mode: Single-player

Waveform is an action game created by Canadian independent developer Eden Industries. The player controls a wave of light as it transmits through space and is able to modify the wave's amplitude and wavelength to line it up with objectives, avoid obstacles, and interact with objects that affect the path of the wave, and the world around it, in various ways.

== Gameplay ==
The player controls a particle of light on a mission from the outer reaches of the Solar System to the Sun. Instead of controlling the particle directly, the amplitude and frequency of its wave pattern can be changed with the mouse. Stretching and shrinking its path is necessary to collect photons, avoid dark matter, and go through light gates, which increase the point multiplier and score.

As the player progresses through the Solar System, they encounter mirrors, wormholes, asteroids, gas clouds, fireworks, and particle accelerators that can change the particle's path, clear away obstacles, or destroy the particle outright. The photon path also becomes trickier, forcing the player to change their wavelength mid-arc to collect them and avoid damage.

Some stages require a certain number of stars to unlock; stars are earned by improving scores on previous levels.

== Development ==
Ryan Vandendyck spent three years developing the game in his spare time while still holding a full time position at Next Level Games. The game was inspired by Auditorium and Orbient.

Eden Industries sought to crowdfund $8,000 towards the game's development through Kickstarter in November 2011. The crowdfunding campaign concluded unsuccessfully in January 2012. Despite the failure of the campaign, the game was released on March 20, 2012.

== Downloadable content ==
Eden Industries created one piece of downloadable content. Waveform: Eris was released on June 4, 2012. Eris is a world of discord and darkness; the player is tasked with restoring the light to a new planet. Eris adds seven new levels to explore, another reverse mode bonus level, a new object called the Pulsar and five new achievements.

== Reception ==
Waveform

Aggregate score
Aggregator	Score
Metacritic	81/100 (8 reviews) (PC)

Waveform was generally well received by both critics and gamers upon release, garnering an average critic score of 81 from 8 reviews on Metacritic.

Destructoid also praised Waveform however said "Wave manipulation is a neat concept -- one I don't recall encountering in this form before -- but despite admirable attempts to introduce slight tweaks to the formula, it is eventually stretched to its limit"
