= GreenSpace =

2011 video game

- Developer: RocketOwl
- Platforms: Adobe Flash, iOS
- Release: Facebook: 1 Aug 2011 iOS: 4 Sept 2012
- Genre: Simulation
- Mode: Single-player with multiplayer interaction

GreenSpace is a social network game created to promote environmentalism. The game was developed by RocketOwl, Inc. and launched on December 1, 2011. The game is free with in-app purchases.

== Development ==
GreenSpace cost US$800,000 to develop over the course of 2010 and 2011. The game began its open beta in August 2011 and soft-launched on December 1, 2011.

On August 2, 2012, GreenSpace received a major update.

In September 2012, GreenSpace was released for iPad.

=== Partnerships ===
In August 2012, RocketOwl and reforestation organization WeForest.org announced the Play2Plant partnership. As players reach in-game milestones in GreenSpace, trees will be planted by WeForest to reflect their progress.

In November 2012, as part of its partnership with weforest.org, RocketOwl announced that it would plant a tree for every new GreenSpace player until the end of 2012. This resulted in more than 10,000 trees planted.

== Reception ==
In November 2012, GreenSpace hit a high of 80,000 monthly active users.

Canadian Videogame Awards 2012 - Finalist for Best Social/Casual Game.

== Legacy ==
The Ottawa Business Journal wrote in 2012 that a sequel called BlueSpace was in production.
