= Taylor Harrington =

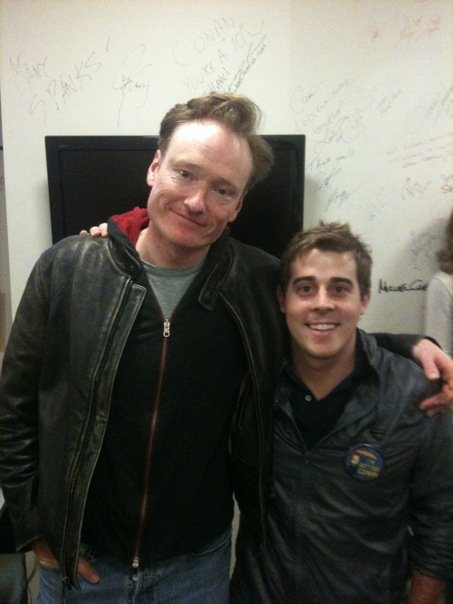
Conan O'Brien and Taylor Harrington

Taylor Harrington (born July 31, 1983, in Cedar Rapids, Iowa) is an American director, film producer and visual effects artist. He is a co-founder of iam8bit, a production company, marketing boutique and artist collective in Los Angeles, California, along with Jon M. Gibson, Amanda White and Nick Ahrens. Since then he has co-founded a new production company "The Malt Shop" in Los Angeles, California.

== Career ==
While still in college, he got his start directing and starring in a multi-state commercial campaign for a bank in the Midwest. He won best in show for the direction and conceptualization of the viral portion of the project at advertising conference in the midwest. After graduation, he moved to Los Angeles and co-founded iam8bit and built out the production capabilities of the company. While working in and around production since then he has expanded his career further into production with his new company "The Malt Shop". Between companies, Harrington produced, directed and created multiple web series, commercials and features with Yaniv Futtci and Kevin Pereira and Chad Schultz at SuperCreative and The Malt Shop.

== Education ==
While attending the University of Wisconsin he studied Film and Sociology. After living in Los Angeles, he was asked to guest lecture at the University of Southern California. and later became an adjunct professor at the Annenberg School for Communication and Journalism to co-lecture a graduate class in multimedia content creation.

== Film & TV ==
He moved to Los Angeles in September 2008, and began producing for iam8bit in 2009, where he co-found the film and production side of the collective, with projects including Capcom's Mega Man Universe. and short film My Barista. He is a self-taught editor and visual effects artist. While at Super Creative. Harrington co-directed and produced two seasons of "Line By Line" a web-series for Russell Simmons All Def Digital starring Wiz Khalifa, 2 Chainz, Riff Raff and E-40. Harrington also co-directed and produced a pilot for Young & Reckless "What Had Happened Was" starring Nick Swardson, Asap Ferg and Dennis Rodman. After co-producing Mother Brother with Chad Schultz and winning best dramatic short at the Arizona International Film Festival the two launched The Malt Shop in 2014. The Malt Shop has produced a number features "I Was a Teenage Wareskunk" and "I Hate The Man in my Basement". Harrington co-wrote and directed a campaign commercial for a company technology company Peri launching its Flagship product "The Duo" in 2015.

== Commercials/Virals ==
- When Did Social Gaming Get So Lame? (2011) editor, SPFX. Boardroom satire featuring venture capitalist icon David Hornik. Produced by iam8bit
- Save the Unicorn Parade (2011) editor, SPFX. PSA satire starring Rachael Leigh Cook. Produced by iam8bit
- Mega Man Universe Teaser Trailer (2010) editor, SPFX. A live-action/stop-motion hybrid teaser trailer for Mega Man Universe. Produced by iam8bit, in conjunction with Buddy System Studios, for Capcom Entertainment
- 'Lost' Mega Man 10 Commercial (2010) editor, SPFX. A "faux" commercial for Mega Man 10, posed as an archival discovery from the '80s. Produced by iam8bit for Capcom Entertainment.

== Books ==
- SUPER iam8bit: More Art Inspired by Classic Videogames of the 80s (2011), a follow-up collection of the iam8bit exhibition's best pieces from the years 2006-2010. Foreword by Kevin Pereira. Co-authored with Jon M. Gibson, Amanda White and Nick Ahrens.
