= Nick Ahrens =

American designer and art director

Nick Ahrens (born November 11, 1983, in Minneapolis) is an American designer and art director. He is a partner in iam8bit.

== Career ==
After a career in professional snowskating, Ahrens held a position at Game Informer magazine for six years. Ahrens also served as the magazine's Media Editor.

== Books ==
- SUPER iam8bit: More Art Inspired by Classic Videogames of the 80s (2011), Co-authored with Jon M. Gibson, Amanda White and Taylor Harrington.
