= Grindstone (video game) =

2019 puzzle-adventure game

- Developer: Capybara Games
- Publisher: Capybara Games
- Director: Dan Vader
- Producer: Nathan Vella
- Designers: Kris Piotrowski; Dan Vader; Kenneth Yeung
- Artists: Kelly Smith; Vic Nguyen; Ben Thomas; Mike Nguyen
- Writers: Dan Vader; Kris Piotrowski; Kelly Smith; Kaitlin Tremblay; Zander Milroy
- Composer: Sam Webster
- Engine: Unity
- Platforms: iOS; MacOS; tvOS; Nintendo Switch; Microsoft Windows; PlayStation 4; PlayStation 5; Xbox Series X/S
- Release: iOS, macOS, tvOS; September 19, 2019; Nintendo Switch; December 15, 2020; Microsoft Windows; May 20, 2021; PS4, PS5, Xbox Series X/S; May 3, 2023
- Genre: puzzle
- Mode: Single-player

Grindstone is a 2019 puzzle video game developed and published by Capybara Games. The game revolves around the player completing levels by clearing enemies using attacks. It was originally released for macOS, iOS, and tvOS through Apple Arcade on September 19, 2019. Its Windows release was exclusive to the Epic Games Store, until 20 of June 2022 when the game was released on Steam.

== Gameplay ==
The player moves Jorj by attacking enemies of the same color

The game takes place on a grid, where the player can move Jorj by attacking monsters with his sword. Jorj can move in eight directions: up, down, left, right alongside diagonal movements. Jorj has three ability slots which can be filled with unique powers such as a bow, which lets you pick one enemy off from around the map. Jorj can only attack one color of monsters at a time, but if the player smashes through 10 monsters, a Grindstone will spawn. This allows Jorj to switch the color of the monster he is attacking, allowing him to chain together larger combos.

While most enemies can be dispatched in one hit, special and boss enemies have additional health points that need to be depleted in order to defeat them. Monsters over time become enraged, meaning that if Jorj lands next to them at the end of a turn, they will attack him. Each level has a goal, which could be defeating a certain amount of enemies, or fighting a boss. Levels also have secondary items to unlock or collect such as a treasure chest. Once the goal is complete, the player has a choice between leaving the level through the gate, or continuing to fight to get more rewards. If the player decides to stay the game starts to get harder, more enemies become enraged making it difficult to make movements. If Jorj takes three hits and depletes his health bar, the player loses all progress in a level, making it risky to stay to get higher rewards.

== Development ==
The original concept for Grindstone dates back to the development of two of Capybara's previous games, Critter Crunch and Might & Magic: Clash of Heroes. The original idea for Grindstone was a color based matching game where the player would move around the board. The setting was designed to be a brutal, "barbarian" world, but with a cartoonish take on the idea. In the early stages of development, the game's standard enemies would be able to attack Jorj in diagonal directions, but the team found it too frustrating and restricted the ability to special enemies only. Grindstones were added to help the player create long combos. The game also had a coin based currency system, but it was removed as Capybara felt it didn't incentivise the player to create long combos.

In the original prototypes, the goal of the game was to get Jorj to the door but it was scrapped in favor of having the player complete a challenge, and then being able to exit through the door. Capybara wanted to have a risk/reward aspect in where the player could try to get more combos but risk dying, or could leave with the rewards they already had. To make the game less frustrating, the team also limited how many different colors of enemies there could be for each level. Items were added to give the player more options in each level, and to incentivize the player to complete more objectives to earn better rewards.

== Release ==
Grindstone was released as a launch title for Apple Arcade on iOS, macOS, and tvOS on September 19, 2019. A Nintendo Switch port was released later on December 15, 2020. Alongside the Switch version, a physical edition was made available through Iam8bit. A Microsoft Windows version released on May 20, 2021 via Epic Games Store, and on Steam on June 20, 2022. The game was made available for PlayStation 4, PlayStation 5, and Xbox Series X/S on May 3, 2023.

== Reception ==
Reception

Aggregate score
Aggregator	Score
Metacritic	iOS: 88/100; NS: 87/100

Review scores
Publication	Score
Destructoid	8.5/10
Edge	9/10
Nintendo Life	8/10
Nintendo World Report	9/10
TouchArcade	4.5/5

Grindstone received positive reviews from critics, who praised the game for its color-matching puzzles and mechanics. The game has "Generally favorable reviews" on Metacritic. Nathan Reinauer of TouchArcade enjoyed the lack of in-app purchases and the cartoon-like visuals. Writing for Destructoid, Jordan Devore praised the gameplay as being easy to pick up and play, but disliked the length of the game, feeling that many of the stages felt like padding.

Grindstone was nominated for Best Mobile Game at The Game Awards 2019, as well as Portable Game of the Year at the 23rd Annual D.I.C.E. Awards. The game also won Best Mobile Game in Edge magazine's 2019 Game of The Year awards.
