= Sexual abuse in the American film industry =

There have been many reported cases and accusations of sexual abuse in the American film industry reported against people related to the medium of cinema of the United States.

Accusations of sexual assault in the industry go back to 1921, and during the last decades they have gained strength due to the accusations against producers, directors, actors and related publicists. Speculation about sexual assault in the industry grew in 1977, when director Roman Polanski left the United States after being convicted on charges of drugging and raping a thirteen-year-old girl.

In October 2017, the issue gained extensive media coverage after producer Harvey Weinstein was accused of sexually abusing more than 80 women. The accusations of Weinstein led to dozens of men and women to publicly begin to denounce sexual aggressions, in what became known as the Weinstein effect and the MeToo movement. Some actors in the medium joined the protest and publicly supported the victims. The subject is of ongoing general interest to the public and continues to feed public opinion, and moreover has served to heighten public awareness and interest in general industry trends that allow events such as these to happen. The public has begun to increasingly look at not only the constraints that women are placed in but also the way the legal system only strengthens these constraints through contracts and such in Hollywood.

== Fatty Arbuckle case ==
The first case of sexual assault in Hollywood to receive widespread media attention occurred on September 5, 1921, when comedian Roscoe "Fatty" Arbuckle was accused of sexually assaulting actress Virginia Rappe. Arbuckle had organized a party in which, it was alleged, he took advantage of Rappe's drunkenness to rape her. The aggression was so violent that Rappe died four days later. The news coverage reached such a pitch that journalist and newspaper tycoon William Randolph Hearst wrote columns in which he directly accused Arbuckle and added details to the event, such as that Arbuckle had raped Rappe with a bottle.

Arbuckle was the defendant in three widely publicized trials for the rape of Rappe, and after the first two trials, which resulted in hung juries, Arbuckle was acquitted in the third trial and received a formal written statement of apology from the jury. Despite Arbuckle's acquittal, the scandal was enough to end his career.

== Patricia Douglas case ==
Patricia Douglas, a dancer and film extra, reported being raped by David Ross, a sales employee at Metro-Goldwyn-Mayer studios, during a party she was hired to entertain guests with dozens of other women hosted by the company in 1937. Patricia reported she was force-fed alcohol, then when she went outside to vomit, Ross forced her into a car and violently raped her. She immediately went to the hospital and filed reports for prosecution, even paying her own legal fees.

A massive retaliation was waged against Patricia to blacklist and ruin her so the case was dropped. Patricia was cleaned at the hospital instead of evidence being collected, news reports revealing her personal information lied that she was promiscuous and had contracted a sexually transmitted disease, and even the prosecutor was accused of taking bribes in exchange for dropping the charges. Director David Stenn found Patricia before she died in 2003, insisting to ask her account once again, which was published in an article by Vanity Fair magazine. Stenn would later release the documentary Girl 27 to cover Patricia's reports and legal efforts and ensuing fallout, as well as other sexual abuses of female celebrities in the American entertainment industry.

Actresses and feminist activists Rose McGowan and Jessica Chastain have voiced their support for the documentary and believe it to be vital education on sexual abuse cultures in Hollywood. McGowan has since publicly accused Hal Roach, at whose ranch the party was held, of facilitating the sexual abuses of even more women at the party, but details haven't been elaborated to expend on the case any further.

== Arthur Freed case ==
In 1988, former child actress Shirley Temple accused Arthur Freed of having sexually harassed her both in her autobiography and in an interview on Larry King Live. Temple alleged that Freed called her into his room and undressed in front of the then-twelve year old actress.

== Louis B. Mayer case ==
Louis B. Mayer has been accused of sexual abuse, including having groped a then-teenage Judy Garland. According to Gerald Clarke's book Get Happy: The Life of Judy Garland, Mayer "held meetings with the young woman seated on his lap, his hands on her chest".

Shirley Temple also made allegations against Mayer in her autobiography, having accused him of sexually propositioning her mother Gertrude in an adjacent room during the incident Temple had with Freed.

== Roman Polanski case ==
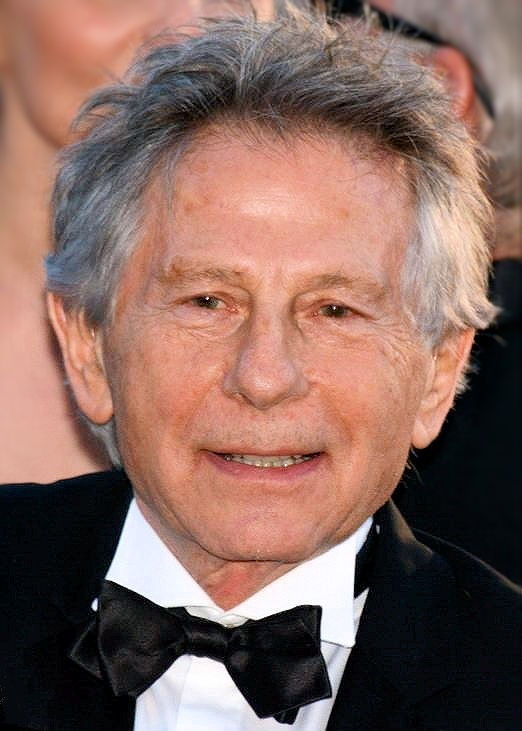
Roman Polanski

In 1977, Samantha Geimer, then 13 years old, accused director Roman Polanski of forcing her to have sex with him. Geimer stated that the director took her to the house of actor Jack Nicholson in Los Angeles, under the pretense of wanting her as a model for a photo shoot for Vogue magazine. There, Polanski supplied her quaaludes and later photographed her topless. Both were alone in Nicholson's house, so Polanski took advantage of the situation by taking her to the master bedroom and then raping her. Polanski was accused of sexual abuse of a minor, drug use, perversion and sodomy, but only convicted pursuant to a plea of unlawful sexual intercourse. The Court ordered 90 days of state prison that included a psychiatric evaluation, while deliberating the final sentence. However, Polanski requested another 90-day probation period to finish a then-current project, which was granted. After filming finished, the director returned to the United States for his evaluation period and was released after 42 days. However, Polanski fled to Europe before his sentencing, after reportedly learning that the judge in the case would renege on a probation agreement and instead impose a jail sentence. Polanski settled in his native France, where his French nationality prevented him from being extradited to the United States. The Polanski case sparked the interest of the American media, who condemned the actions of the French authorities.

In March 2003, during the 75th Academy Awards ceremony, Polanski was awarded the Academy Award for Best Director for the film The Pianist; Polanski did not attend. Attendees at the ceremony gave the director a standing ovation, despite his being absent. In September 2009, he was arrested at the Zürich Airport in Switzerland at the request of American authorities on the Samantha Geimer case. However, the following year, the Justice Department announced that Switzerland would not extradite Polanski. In December 2016, the Supreme Court of Poland rejected a request for Polanski's extradition. Polanski is a dual citizen of France and Poland, and as of 2016 lived in France, which does not extradite its citizens. In 2017, Geimer herself asked to close the case, saying that she had forgiven him years earlier.

In 2010, Charlotte Lewis also accused Polanski of predatory sexual conduct against her when she was 16 years old, claiming that Polanski insisted that she sleep with him in return for casting her in the 1986 film Pirates.

== Woody Allen case ==
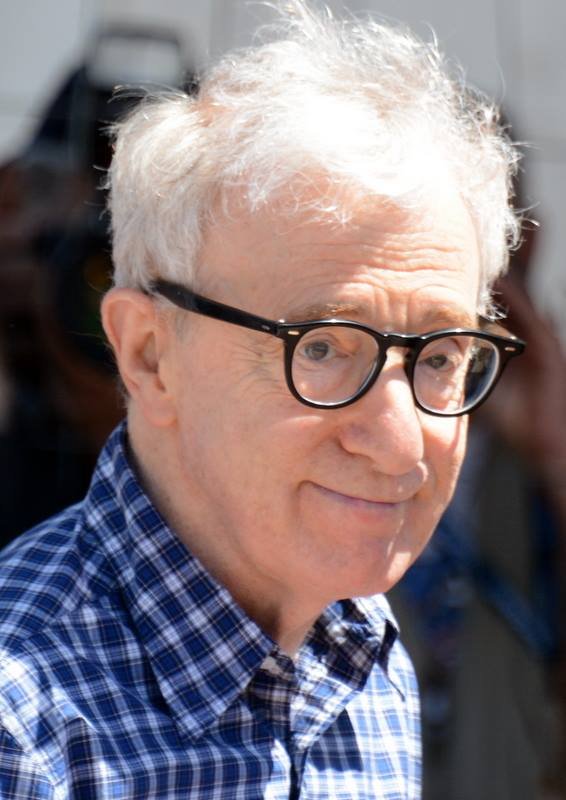
Woody Allen in 2015

In 1978, actress Mia Farrow and her husband André Previn adopted Soon-Yi Previn, born in Seoul. After Farrow's divorce from Previn, she began a relationship with film director Woody Allen. In December 1987, Farrow and Allen had a son, Satchel (who would later go by the name Ronan Farrow). Farrow had adopted two other children by herself: Moses in 1978 and Dylan in 1985. Allen would co-adopt them in December 1991.

In January 1992, a crisis in the relationship between Farrow and Allen appeared when Farrow discovered Allen and her oldest adopted daughter Soon-Yi were having an affair, which the couple admitted. Later that year, on August 17, Allen issued a statement saying that he was in love with Previn and the affair still existed.

The relationship between Woody Allen and Soon-Yi Previn had started in December 1991, when Soon-Yi was 21 years old. The discovery of their affair sparked a dispute over custody of the younger children Satchel (later: Ronan), Dylan and Moses, in the course of which an allegation of sexual abuse against Allen arose. While the parties were negotiating how to resolve custody of the children, they had agreed that Allen could make supervised visits to the minor children.

On August 4, 1992, Farrow received Allen in her Connecticut holiday home and went shopping with a friend, leaving 7-year-old Dylan and 4-year-old Satchel under the care of two babysitters, who had explicit instructions never to leave the children alone, and were accompanied by another nanny and the three children of Farrow's friend Casey Pascal. Moses Farrow, who was then 14 years old, was also present. Although no one observed that Allen or Dylan had left the group that day, the babysitters retraced their steps and concluded that there may have been a period of 10 or 20 minutes in which they were neither with Allen nor Dylan. At this point, Allen was alleged to have taken Dylan to a crawl space behind Mia Farrow's bedroom closet and sexually abused her.

The police investigation began several days later, after a pediatrician whom Mia had taken Dylan to had informed the police (as required by law). The State Police and Connecticut Attorney's Office referred Dylan to the Child Sexual Abuse Clinic at Yale New Haven Hospital to determine if she had been sexually abused. After a six-month investigation, the hospital's Child Sexual Abuse Clinic concluded that Dylan was not sexually abused by Allen and that Dylan's statements did not refer to actual events that occurred to her. They stated that the allegation was likely a combination of emotional distress and coaching by her mother.

The allegation was also investigated by New York Social Services, who concluded that there was no credible evidence of abuse, and by the New York Supreme Court in the custody case, which dismissed the abuse allegation.

In the closing statements of the custody trials, Mia Farrow's attorney, Eleanor Alter, acknowledged the possibility that the allegation of abuse was all Dylan's fantasies, but that Dylan still believed it had actually happened. In February 2014, when she was 28, Dylan repeated the assault allegation in an open letter in the New York Times blog of Nicholas Kristof, a family friend, stating: "When I was seven years old, Woody Allen took me by the hand and took me to a dark attic on the second floor of our house. He told me to lie on my stomach and play with my brother's electric train. Then he abused me sexually, he spoke to me while he was doing it, whispering to me that I was a good girl, that this was our secret and he promised me that we would go to Paris and I would become a movie star."

Although Allen has denied the allegation against him, his son Ronan defended his sister. Ronan was one of the first journalists to write about the sexual abuse allegations against Harvey Weinstein, leading to the Weinstein effect and the Me Too movement. Conversely, Ronan and Dylan's older brother, Moses Farrow, who was 14 years old in 1992, wrote an open letter saying that he was in the house that day and had never lost sight of Allen and Dylan, that there was no sexual abuse, that the allegation was a fabrication by Mia Farrow and that there had never been an electric train set in the attic, as Dylan had claimed.

Allen has been married to Soon-Yi since 1997. Amidst the allegations against Allen, Soon-Yi released a statement to the press stating that her mother Mia Farrow had been abusive and emotionally unstable in the household. She gave an interview in New York Magazine in which she professed Allen's innocence and characterized Farrow as an emotionally and physically abusive parent. Dylan and Ronan Farrow both denounced Previn's allegations about their mother.

Following the 2017 accusations against Allen, actors such as Griffin Newman, Elliot Page, Evan Rachel Wood, Drew Barrymore, Kate Winslet, David Krumholtz, Greta Gerwig, Mira Sorvino, Rebecca Hall, Timothée Chalamet, Rachel Brosnahan, Natalie Portman, Colin Firth, Marion Cotillard, Chloë Sevigny, Joaquin Phoenix, Hayley Atwell, Peter Sarsgaard, and Elle Fanning publicly expressed their regret for having worked with Allen, with Newman, Hall, Chalamet and Fanning saying they would donate their earnings from Allen's film A Rainy Day in New York (2018) to charities. Conversely, actors Diane Keaton, Alec Baldwin, Anjelica Huston, Dianne Wiest, Judy Davis, Jeff Goldblum, Javier Bardem, Léa Seydoux, Samantha Morton, Cherry Jones, Wallace Shawn, Alan Alda, Gina Gershon, Larry David, Richard Kind, and Scarlett Johansson came out in his defense. Actor Michael Caine initially said he wouldn't work again with Allen but later retracted his statement, commenting that the accusations against Allen were not proved and that "You can't go on hearsay the whole time".

On December 18, 2025, Democrats of the United States House Committee on Oversight and Government Reform released more photos related to Jeffrey Epstein's child trafficking activities in preparation of the expected deadline release of the Epstein files the following day, with Allen included in some of the photos.

== Bryan Singer case ==
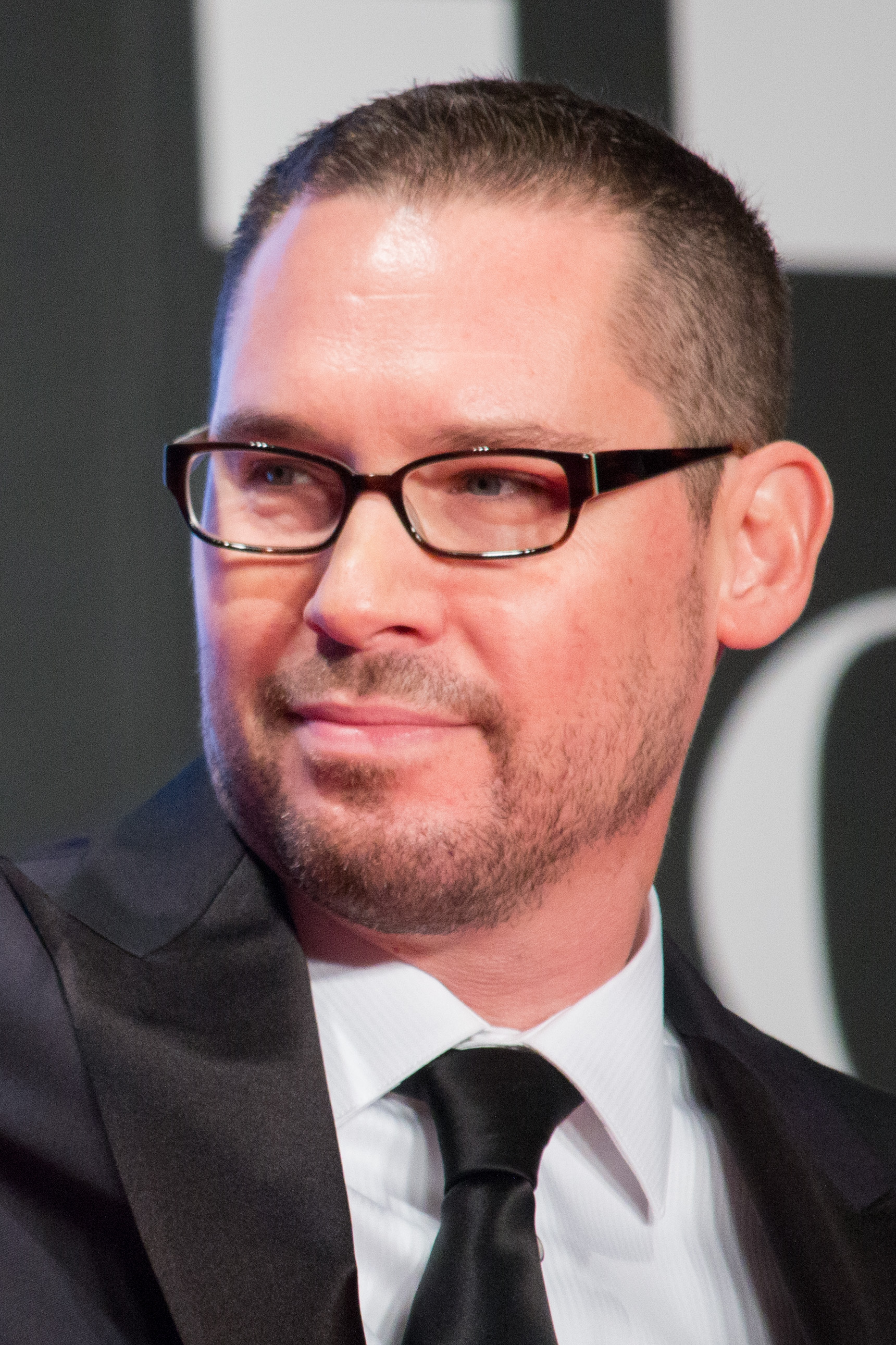
Bryan Singer in 2013

In 1997, a 14-year-old extra accused American filmmaker Bryan Singer of asking him and other minors to film a shower scene nude for the film Apt Pupil. Two other adolescent boys, 16 and 17 years old, later supported the allegation and filed a civil suit against the filmmakers alleging infliction of emotional distress, negligence, and invasion of privacy, and alleged that they were filmed for sexual gratification. The Los Angeles County District Attorney's Office declined to press criminal charges against Singer or anyone else named in the lawsuit.

In April 2014, actor and model Michael Egan sued Singer for sexual assault of a minor, alleging that Singer drugged and raped him in Hawaii over a period of two years after meeting him at parties hosted by convicted sex offender Marc Collins-Rector. On May 22, 2014, however, Singer's attorney presented evidence to Federal District Judge Susan Oki Mollway showing that neither Singer nor Egan was in Hawaii at the time. In early August 2014, Egan withdrew his lawsuit The following year, Egan was sentenced to two years in prison for unrelated charges of conspiracy to commit securities and wire fraud.

In May 2014, attorney Jeff Herman filed a lawsuit against Singer on behalf of an anonymous British man. Both Singer and producer Gary Goddard (who was also named separately in the first case) were accused of sexually assaulting "John Doe No. 117". According to the lawsuit, Goddard and Singer met the man for sex when he was a minor and engaged in acts of "gender violence" against him while in London for the premiere of Singer's film Superman Returns. The charge against Singer in this case was dismissed, at the accuser's request, in July 2014.

In the 2014 film An Open Secret, a documentary on child sexual abuse in Hollywood, made reference to Singer, but details of Egan's allegations were omitted after Egan withdrew his lawsuit during the film's production. Author Bret Easton Ellis alleged that two of his former partners had attended underage sex parties hosted by Singer and fellow director Roland Emmerich.

On December 7, 2017, Cesar Sanchez-Guzman filed a lawsuit in Washington against Singer, alleging that the director had raped him in 2003, when he was 17. After the lawsuit was announced, the USC School of Cinematic Arts removed Singer's name from its Division of Cinema & Media Studies program.

On January 23, 2019, Alex French and Maximillian Potter published an investigative report in The Atlantic in which four more men alleged that Singer sexually assaulted them when they were underage.

== Max Landis case ==
In June 2019, filmmaker Max Landis (son of director John Landis) was accused by eight women of emotional, sexual abuse, and psychological manipulation. His past friends, colleagues, and girlfriends state that he would use his wealth, family connections, and friend group as a decoy and shield to cover his pattern of predations.

In 2007, during the production for a student film, actress Masha Mendieta recalls that she and the other “sorority extras” had to get topless and were verbally harassed. In summer 2013 on the set of his directorial debut for Me Him Her, he met costume designer Tasha Goldthwait, who accused him of being physically, sexually, and abusive towards her, which led her to quit the project. In 2017, actress Anna Akana publicly spoke against him responding to a Netflix tweet promoting his project Bright, “Written by a psychopath who sexually abused and assaults women, right? Cool.” Several women came forward after Anna Akana’s tweet. Zoë Quinn tweeted, “Sometimes men who commit sexual assault are talented screenwriters and their work comes with baggage. Other times, they’re Max Landis”.

An ex-girlfriend recalls that he would instigate fights, belittle, and upset her to make her cry, which turned him on. “He never got better; he only learned to say the right things,” she told The Daily Beast. Another ex-girlfriend stated that he would use his illness, cyclothymia, as an excuse for his abusive behavior; it made it harder for her to see his actions as abuse, which she would wind up comforting him. He kept a “very long list” of women’s names in which he had slept with and had them ranked. Landis was self-aware who admitted that he was “difficult or a monster or worse”. One of his victims stated that everyone would say “that’s just how Max is. He’s a jerk. He knows it. He calls himself out on it”.

Due to the allegations, he was removed as a producer from the film Shadow in the Cloud. Chronicle director Josh Trank fully supports these allegations and said, “to read about the terror he’s inflicted on so many women since then makes me sick to my stomach”. He was fired from Writ Large, the firm that managed him, as soon as they heard about The Daily Beast article. He signed with Creative Artists Agency (CAA) but since the allegations came out, he was fired.

== Other cases ==
In other cases, actor Jeffrey Jones was arrested in 2003 after forcing a 14-year-old boy to pose nude for him; Jones did not deny the accusations and was sentenced to 5 years probation and was required to register as a sex offender. In the 1980s, Victor Salva (director of Jeepers Creepers) served 15 months in prison for abusing a 12-year-old boy named Nathan Forrest Winters—one of the actors in his film Clownhouse—and for forcing him to have oral sex with another 14-year-old boy. Salva had become friends with Winters' parents in order to gain their trust before inviting Winters to his house, where he sexually assaulted him. According to Winters, he was "blackballed" from working in the industry ever again, while Salva was released early from prison and has continued to work in Hollywood. Salva was required to register as a sex offender. In early 2017, Wild Card actress Greice Santo and her husband R. J. Cipriani accused Edmonton Oilers owner Daryl Katz of offering money to Santo in exchange for sexual favors and film producer Michael Gelmon of defending Katz and threatening to end Santo's career.

In 2004, actor and producer Brian Peck was convicted of a lewd act against a child and oral copulation of a person under 16 and was sentenced to 16 months in prison and was required to register as a sex offender. That child was later revealed to be Drake Bell, who revealed his identity in the Investigation Discovery series Quiet on Set: The Dark Side of Kids TV.

Executive producer Steven Marshall was sentenced to 7 1/2 years in prison for distribution of child pornography. Marshall was arrested in 2009 on charges of distribution and possession of child pornography. Marshall pleaded guilty to distribution and the possession charge was dropped. Authorities say he engaged in sending and receiving child pornography and participated in online chats detailing child abduction, bondage, rapes and murders.

Bob Villard, a headshot photographer and manager who has represented Tobey Maguire, Leonardo DiCaprio and other actors, was charged with transportation of child pornography. Villard was accused in 2001 and charged after searches of his home uncovered thousands of photographs of boys in skimpy bathing suits posed in sexually suggestive positions. He pleaded no contest to a misdemeanor and was sentenced to three years of probation. In 2005, Villard was back in court and pleaded no contest to the felony charge of committing a lewd act on a child. The victim was a 13-year-old boy who sought his services as an acting coach. Villard was given an eight-year prison sentence.

In 2016, acting coach and actor Cameron Thor, best known for playing Lewis Dodgson in the 1993 film Jurassic Park, was sentenced to six years in prison for sexually assaulting 13-year-old Jordyn Ladell in 2009. Consequently, his role as Lewis Dodgson was recast with Campbell Scott for the 2022 film Jurassic World Dominion.

In November 2017, actor Corey Feldman expressed interest in making a documentary that would expose pedophilia in Hollywood and the "sectors of power" within the industry. Feldman alleged that he suffered sexual abuse within what he described as a "network of prostitution". Feldman said he would seek money to hire lawyers to back him up, since the material to be published would make a direct statement against "six main Hollywood producers who would seek to deny it." Feldman also said that his friend and fellow child actor Corey Haim, who died in 2010, had died without being able to tell the public the name of the person who raped him when both were looking for a job opportunity. Feldman had already participated in the 2014 documentary An Open Secret, which exhibited the sexual abuse committed during the casting and recruitment of young actors in movies or commercials by people in the film industry. The documentary also makes multiple references to the accusations against Singer, and the opinions of the children's parents, who at some point saw themselves as needing to "trust" the agents for the means to improve their economic condition. Similarly, the case of photographer Bob Villard was exposed in the material. According to the statements, Villard took photographs of children and adolescents and then sold them without permission or authorization from parents through the eBay portal as erotic content.

In 2019, Rob Cohen (director of xXx and The Mummy: Tomb of the Dragon Emperor) was accused by an unnamed woman of getting her drunk and sexually assaulting her while she was unconscious in a hotel room. Early that year, Cohen was also accused by his transgender daughter Valkyrie Weather and his ex-wife Dianna Mitzner of sexually assaulting the former when she was a toddler. Cohen denied both allegations. In January 2021, Cohen was also accused by actress Asia Argento of drugging her with GHB and raping her during filming of xXx, leading one of Cohen's representatives to dismiss the story as "absolutely false". In 2018, Argento herself was accused by actor Jimmy Bennett of sexually assaulting him when he was 17 and she was 37. In the wake of Bennett's claims, Argento was dropped from X-Factor Italy.

In June 2025, Tyler Perry was accused of sexual harassment, assault and retaliation by actor Derek Dixon, who is suing Perry for $260 million in damages. The lawsuit is accusing Perry of “promising him career advancement and creative opportunities, such as producing his pilot and casting him in his show, only to subject him to escalating sexual harassment, assault and battery, and professional retaliation when Mr. Dixon did not reciprocate Mr. Perry’s unwanted advances.” Perry has denied the allegations and his attorney states that Dixon is “setting up a scam.”

== Reported cases ==
=== Bill Cosby case ===
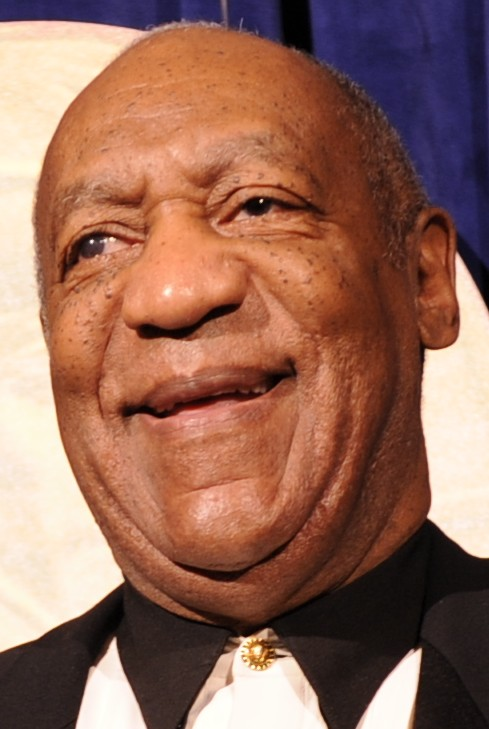
Bill Cosby was accused of sexual abuse by around 60 women.

Since 2014, around 60 women publicly accused actor and television presenter Bill Cosby of sexually abusing them during the 1970s and 1980s. Most contended that Cosby had drugged them to facilitate the aggression. For example, former model Janice Dickinson said that one afternoon in 1982, while suffering from intense menstrual pain, Cosby recommended a "pill" that would supposedly calm the discomfort. "The last thing I remember was Bill Cosby in a patchwork robe, dropping his robe and getting on top of me," she told CNN. "And I remember a lot of pain." In the same article, actress and producer Barbara Bowman also accused Cosby of raping her.

In December 2015, three Class II felony charges of aggravated indecent assault were filed against Cosby in Montgomery County, Pennsylvania for the assault of Andrea Constand, based on allegations concerning incidents from January 2004. Cosby's first trial in June 2017 ended in a mistrial.

After the mistrial, Cosby faced a second criminal trial over charges of sexual abuse. In January 2018, he joked about the issue and appeared unconcerned. Throughout the trial, Cosby and his lawyer relied on the image of Cosby in America's eyes and argued that the media was portraying Cosby in a light that would easily sway the jury. They also went on to say that Cosby was being discriminated against as a black man in America. Cosby furthered this notion in many interviews, maintaining that these allegations were based on his race in America.

On April 26, 2018, Cosby was found guilty of three counts of aggravated indecent assault, and on September 25, 2018, Cosby was sentenced to three to ten years in state prison and fined $25,000, plus the cost of the prosecution, $43,611. Cosby appealed on June 25, 2019.

On June 30, 2021, Cosby was released from prison and his conviction was overturned. It was decided that District Attorney Kevin Steele had unjustly prosecuted Cosby, since his predecessor had agreed not to after Cosby's testimony in Constand's civil case.

=== Francis Ford Coppola case ===
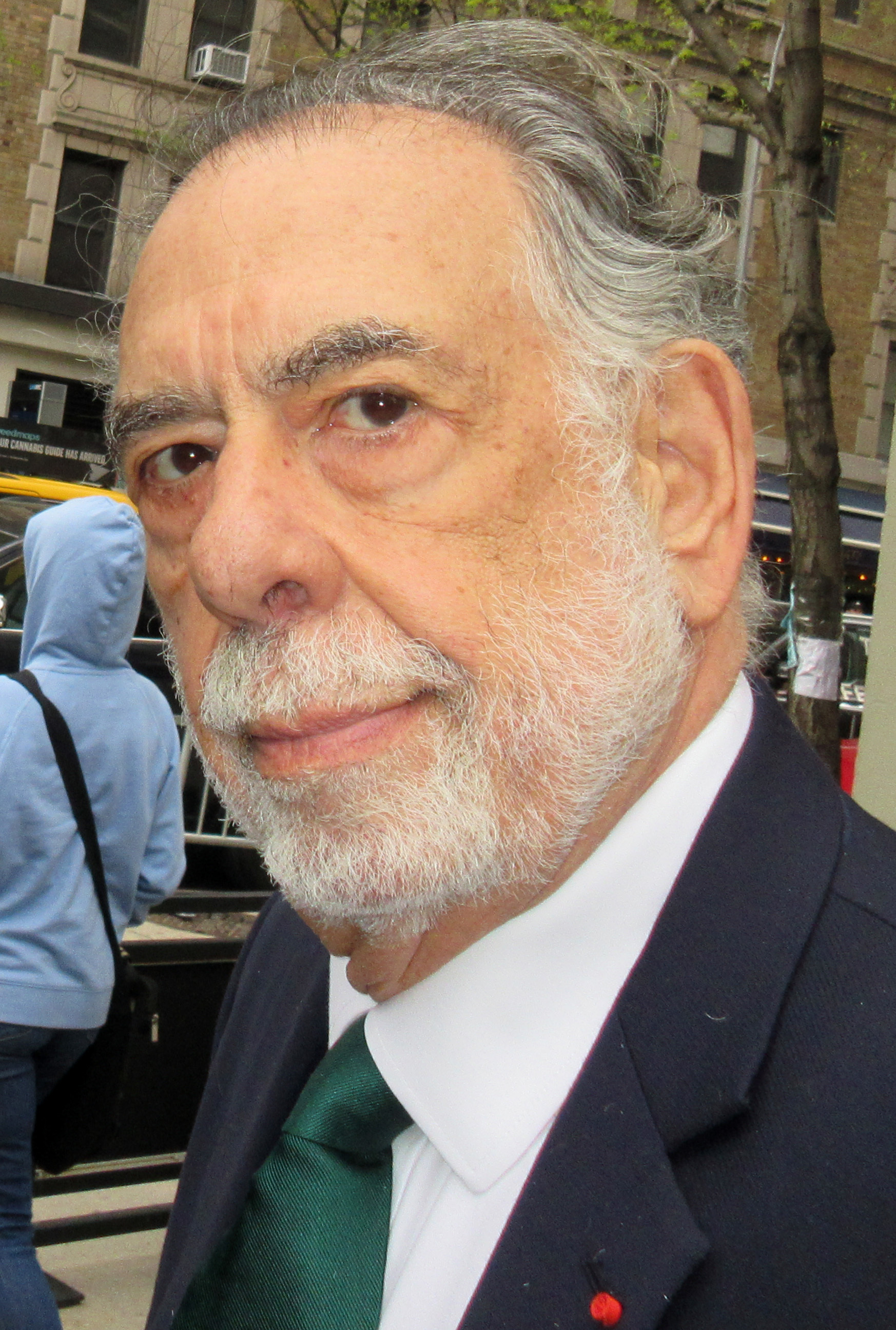
Francis Ford Coppola was accused by dubious reports of groping and kissing female extras of his Megalopolis film in an apparent effort to sabotage his project.

In the months leading up to the release of his longtime passion project Megalopolis in 2024, filmmaker Francis Ford Coppola was accused by The Guardian of having kissed and touched female extras in ways people found inappropriate. However, Coppola dismissed the accusations in an interview with Rolling Stone on August 25, 2024 by pointing out that all those women he kissed were ones who already knew him and that the newspaper's reporters were the same ones that lied to The Hollywood Reporter just as the Cannes Film Festival premiere of his film approached about him firing or resigning his crewmembers, accusing them of trying to "damage" his picture due to not following the modern Hollywood's rules.

== Later accusations ==
=== Accusations around the 89th Academy Awards ===
There were two high-profile accusations around the time of the 89th Academy Awards.

In October 2016, following the premiere of the movie The Birth of a Nation (2016), its director and lead actor, Nate Parker, was singled out for a 1999 case in which he and his friend Jean Celestin (who co-wrote the film) were accused of drugging and sexually abusing an 18-year-old woman. The promotion of The Birth of a Nation came amidst a climate of accusations against its director, which were credited with hampering the film's success.

Actor Casey Affleck was also accused of sexual harassment. According to reports, during the filming of the movie I'm Still Here (2010), Affleck was accused of sexually harassing both the film's producer Amanda White and director of photography Magdalena Górka. Both parties reached an out-of-court settlement in 2010. Actress Brie Larson, having won the Best Actress Award at the Academy Awards a year earlier, had to present the award to Affleck for Best Actor, but did not applaud when the actor went on stage to collect the award. Later, she would say that, "whatever it was that I did onstage kind of spoke for itself". In January 2018, Affleck announced that he would not present the Academy Award for Best Actress at the 90th Academy Awards ceremony, so as not to be the subject of attention during the time of the #MeToo movement.

=== Allegations in 2015 and 2016 ===
In 2015, Linda Lewis, daughter-in-law of Loretta Young, stated publicly that Young had confided to her shortly before her death that the birth of her daughter Judy Lewis, widely assumed to have been the result of an consensual relationship with Clark Gable during filming of Call of the Wild (1935), was the result of Young being date raped at the hands of Gable.

In 2016, actress Tippi Hedren claimed in her autobiography that she had been sexually harassed by film director Alfred Hitchcock during the filming of The Birds (1963) and that he had forbidden other male actors to approach her.

At the end of 2016, it was reported that Marlon Brando had sexually abused actress Maria Schneider in 1972 during a scene in the film Last Tango in Paris (1972). According to the reports, neither Brando nor director Bernardo Bertolucci warned the actress that she would be filming a rape scene with Brando that day, leading in turn to reports that Bertolucci had "confessed" to Schneider being raped on set, prompting Bertolucci to release a statement clarifying that a simulation and not actual intercourse had taken place.

=== Harvey Weinstein case ===
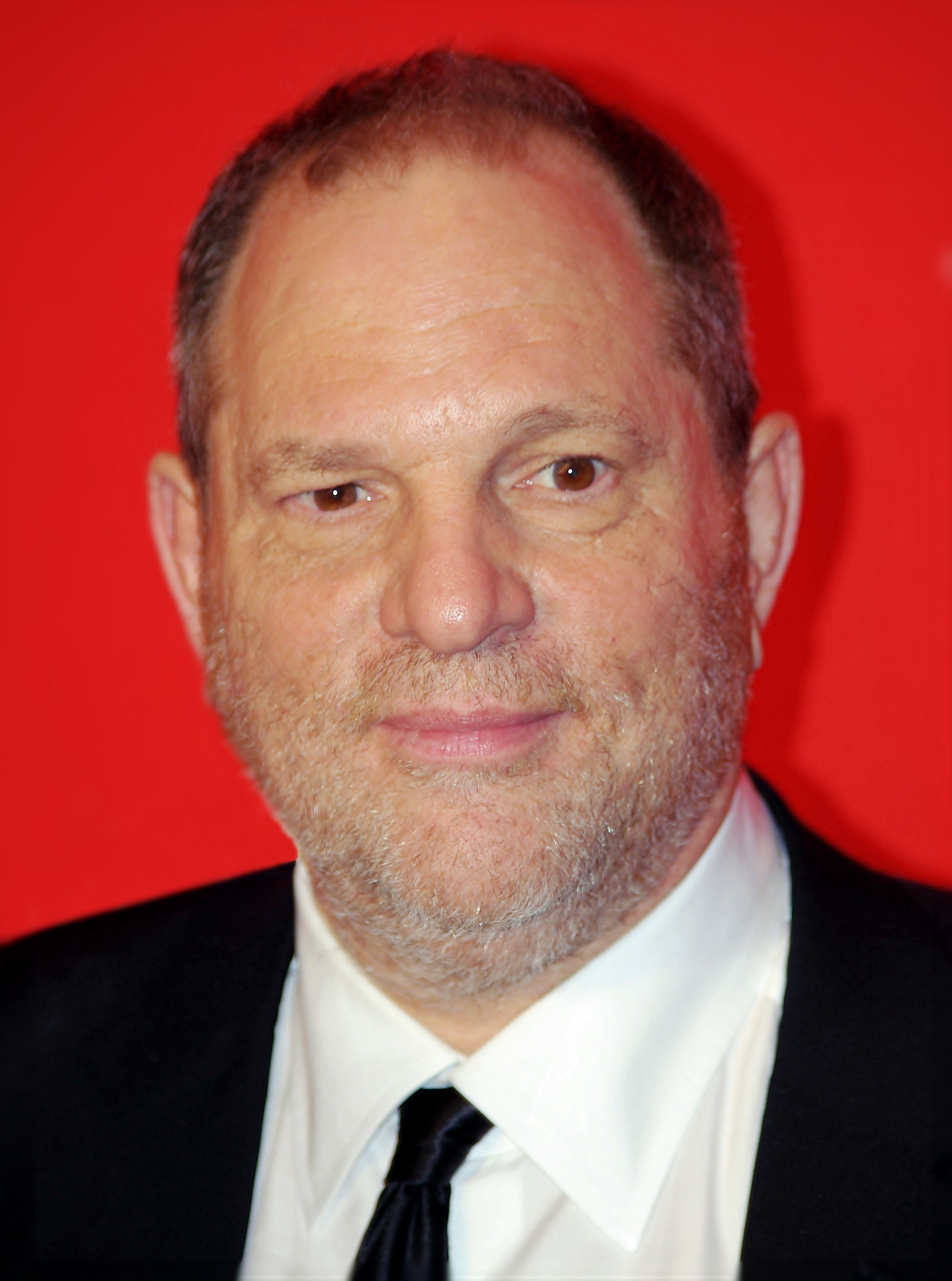
The Weinstein case led dozens of victims to expose their aggressions.

The subject of sexual abuse in Hollywood acquired important significance in the world media in 2017, after producer Harvey Weinstein, founder of Miramax and the Weinstein Company, was accused by more than 80 women of having sexually assaulted them. The accusations ranged from sexual harassment to rape, with Weinstein denying any wrongdoing. According to the women's reports, Weinstein invited young actresses or models to a hotel room or office on the pretext of discussing their careers, and then demanded massages or sexual intercourse. In an audio recording revealed during the ensuing scandal, Weinstein can be heard pressing model Ambra Gutierrez to accompany him to take a shower and, after her refusal, he insists, "I will not do anything to you, I swear it for my children."

Among the actresses who claim to have suffered harassment or rape by Weinstein are Rose McGowan, Angelina Jolie, Mira Sorvino, Paz de la Huerta, Annabella Sciorra and Gwyneth Paltrow. Another, Italian actress Asia Argento, collated a list of sexual abuse accusations against Weinstein. The incidents alleged in the list date from 1980 to 2015 and include 18 complaints of rape. In them, it is alleged that Weinstein granted important roles in films in exchange for sexual favors. As a result, the Weinstein Company and the Academy of Motion Picture Arts and Sciences decided to expel Weinstein.

Weinstein has been charged with first and third degree rape. He was sentenced to 23 years in a maximum security prison on March 11, 2020. This has led to a larger conversation on what these implications of sexual assault have on other industries. In light of the scandal, others in varying industries have stepped forward to admit they have been sexually assaulted, leading to a conversation about a culture that perpetuates this. Many have begun a larger conversation on the cover-up of the abuses and the nuances that lead to it.

Weinstein, however, continues to maintain his innocence, and his attorneys believe his conviction was achieved due to peer pressure. Weinstein's attorney Donna Rotunno says it was fueled by the pressure to charge a man with five accounts against him, and that emotions ran high in the courtroom, furthering the jury's pressure to convict Weinstein. Both Weinstein and Rotunno maintain that the women had consensual encounters with Weinstein, providing texts between the women and Weinstein that indicated potential consent.

The accusations against Weinstein led to the disclosure of a number of victims of other sexual assaults by people in the film industry.

=== Kevin Spacey case ===
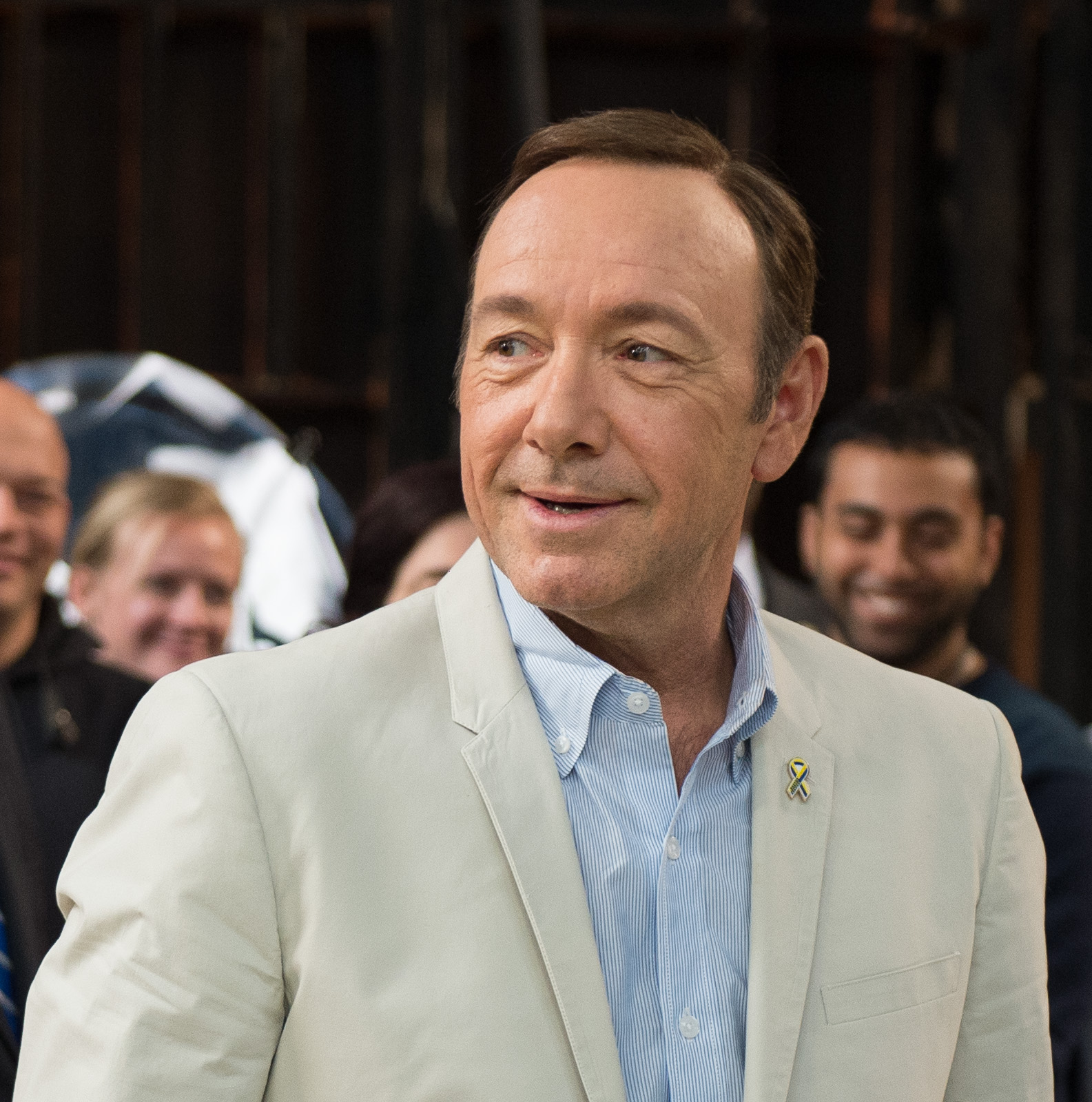
Kevin Spacey

On October 30, 2017, actor Anthony Rapp stated that in 1986, when he was 14, he had been sexually assaulted by actor Kevin Spacey, then 26, during a party held at Spacey's home. According to the statement, Rapp claimed that he was in Spacey's bedroom watching TV during the party when an intoxicated Spacey walked in and laid on top of him.

In response to these allegations, Spacey released a statement on Twitter saying that he did not remember the incident, and apologized to Rapp for "deeply inappropriate drunken behavior" if he had done what Rapp had accused him of. In the same statement, Spacey came out as gay. This intensified public condemnation of Spacey, with several members of the LGBT community in Hollywood such as George Takei and Billy Eichner accusing Spacey of coming out as a distraction from Rapp's accusation, as well as using drunkenness as an excuse for sexual misconduct and suggesting a connection between homosexuality and pedophilia.

Within days, 15 other people came forward with accusations that Spacey had sexually harassed or assaulted them. Technical staff from the Netflix television series House of Cards, in which Spacey starred, declared that the actor frequently harassed men during filming. He was also accused of sexually harassing young men at the Old Vic, where he worked as artistic director from 2003 to 2015, with one alleged victim stating, "It seems that it only took being a male under 30 to make Mr. Spacey feel free to touch us."

After the accusations, Spacey announced his admission to the Meadows clinic in Arizona to undergo treatment for sex addiction. Netflix broke commercial ties with the actor, leading them to cancel the proposed Gore Vidal biopic Gore, which would have starred Spacey, and his participation in the forthcoming film All the Money in the World (2017) was eliminated, with actor Christopher Plummer enlisted to replace Spacey and re-shoot the scenes with Spacey's character, J. Paul Getty. House of Cards later announced that its following sixth season would be the series' last, and that it would be filmed without Spacey. Taxi Driver (1976) writer Paul Schrader originally planned to do a Frank Sinatra biopic starring Spacey, but no studios accepted to do the film with Spacey cast despite his acquittal, resulting in the project being dropped.

=== #MeToo ===
The accusations against Harvey Weinstein unleashed a campaign through the hashtag Me Too, with which different people joined the list of victims of sexual abuse by actors, directors and producers. The comedian Louis C.K. and filmmaker Brett Ratner had projects canceled after receiving at least six accusations each; C.K. later confirmed the allegations against him - that he had forced several women to watch him masturbate - and apologized, while Ratner denied the claims of sexual harassment made against him by actresses such as Olivia Munn and Natasha Henstridge. This led C.K. to have his contract severed by FX so he wouldn't get further compensation from Better Things and Baskets, getting a Netflix stand up special cancelled, be removed from Illumination's The Secret Life of Pets 2 with Patton Oswalt taking over his role and get his guest star role in the Disney Channel animated series Gravity Falls redubbed by Alex Hirsch; Ratner's planned biopic about Hugh Hefner slated to be written by Jeff Nathanson and meant to star Robert Downey Jr. and Jared Leto at different points was put on hold by the Playboy magazine, Warner Bros. chose to not renew their co-producing deal with Ratner's company RatPac Entertainment, Millennium Media opted to not move forward with Ratner's long-gestated Milli Vanilli biopic and Ratner has had trouble in pitching Rush Hour 4 due to studios being turned off by his involvement in the pitch. The filmmaker James Toback had a total of 200 accusations of sexual harassment levied against him.

Acting coach Anna Graham Hunter made allegations against the actor Dustin Hoffman, claiming that in 1985, during the filming of the television film Death of a Salesman, the actor groped her and harassed her; for example, when she asked Hoffman what he wanted to eat at breakfast, Hoffman replied, "I'll have a hard-boiled egg and a soft-boiled clitoris." This accusation was soon followed by those of six other women. Hoffman later released an apology but denied wrongdoing, saying, "I have the utmost respect for women and feel terrible that anything I might have done could have put her in an uncomfortable situation," continuing, "I am sorry. It is not reflective of who I am," but has not publicly responded to the other six allegations.

Actor Blaise Godbe Lipman accused agent Tyler Grasham of abusing him when he was 17 or 18. Lipman, who is gay, stated that Grasham (who is gay too) threatened to out him in a moment in which Lipman was not ready to make it public. Canadian actor Jordan Gavaris also accused Grasham of "repeatedly harassing" him on account of his (Gavaris') sexual orientation. Grasham was subsequently investigated by the Los Angeles Police Department following a rape accusation.

Other actors like Richard Dreyfuss, James Woods, and Jeffrey Tambor denied accusations made against them. In January 2018, after winning the Golden Globe Award for Best Actor – Motion Picture Musical or Comedy, James Franco was accused by five women, including Sarah Tither-Kaplan, who claimed that when she was a student in Franco's acting class, he forced them to undress and remove the plastic protections during the filming of sex scenes. Franco did not attend the 23rd Critics' Choice Awards ceremony afterwards.

Time magazine named the "Silence Breakers" behind the Me Too movement to collectively be Time Person of the Year in 2017.

In August 2020, a woman filed a lawsuit against Cuba Gooding Jr. accusing him of raping her in 2013 in New York City. In 2024, Gooding was mentioned in a sexual assault lawsuit brought against Sean "Diddy" Combs by music producer Rodney Jones.

=== Accusations of complicity and criticisms ===
Public opinion was against not only those who committed sexual abuse but those who covered for or silenced complaints against them. Actors such as Matt Damon and Ben Affleck admitted hearing about Weinstein sexually harassing and assaulting women in Hollywood. After actress Meryl Streep denied having knowledge of Weinstein's behavior, actress Rose McGowan, one of his victims, rejected her claim and called her a "hypocrite".

On January 7, 2018, during the 75th Golden Globe Awards ceremony, the vast majority of attendees decided to wear black in solidarity with the victims. The participation of some attendees was criticized, including Streep herself and Oprah Winfrey, who, after receiving the honorary Cecil B. DeMille Award, dedicated her speech to the victims of such aggressions. That same night, singer Seal declared that Winfrey had been a friend of Weinstein's and claimed that she knew about his behavior.

Actor Liam Neeson criticized the #MeToo movement, alleging that the accusations against his fellow actors had turned into a witch hunt, adding, "There are some people, famous individuals, who are suddenly accused of touching a girl's knee, or something like that, and then they are dismissed from their shows." In an interview with Natalie Morales on the Today Show in September 2018, actor Sean Penn criticized the #MeToo movement as one "that gets glommed onto in great stridency and rage and without nuance," and that served to "divide men and women". In January 2018, French actress Brigitte Bardot called some of the actresses who denounced the abuses "hypocrites". In her statement, she said, "There are many actresses who provoke the producers to obtain a role, then, when speaking of them, they say they were harassed."

=== In popular culture ===
At the 85th Academy Awards nominations ceremony on January 10, 2013, host Seth MacFarlane joked when announcing the Best Supporting Actress nominees: "Congratulations, you five ladies no longer have to pretend to be attracted to Harvey Weinstein."

On January 10, 2016, the presenter of the 73rd Golden Globe Awards ceremony, Ricky Gervais, made the following comment about the movie Spotlight (about journalists for the Boston Globe who investigated the child sexual abuse scandal in the Catholic Church): "Spotlight is the movie about how a group of sexual predators was allowed to abuse children and continue working with impunity and without punishment. Roman Polanski called it 'the best date movie ever.'"

On January 7, 2018, during the 75th Golden Globe Awards ceremony, presenter Seth Meyers said in reference to the movie The Shape of Water: "When I heard that the story of an innocent woman who falls in love with a water monster was filmed, I just said, 'Oh no, not another Woody Allen movie!' It's like Manhattan, in water."

== Psychology and behavior ==
The psychology center Cepsim in Madrid, Spain described in summary the profile of the abuser: "They are men or women with a lot of power who use it with vulnerable people to get what they want. Normally they lack empathy, which is what places us in someone else's pain and makes us not hurt or be selfish." The Department of Psychology of the University of Málaga added that rapists do not usually assimilate that they are committing a crime, since their minds are usually narcissistic. The personality of abusers in show business also has atypical behaviors, such as pressuring actresses and models to attend castings or sign contracts in unusual places such as hotel rooms or private rooms. After the abuse, they resort to blackmail or a direct threat to silence the victim. Criminal law lawyer Alicia Ozores explained to the newspaper La Vanguardia that some abusers tried to take refuge under the argument that "they were addicted to sex", this in order to reduce a sentence and cleanse their image because sex addiction is a recognized disorder. Weinstein and Spacey claimed to suffer from sexual addiction in response to the accusations against them.

Many sexual abusers use persuasion, deception or pressure, rather than physical violence or force, to subdue their victims. They often have authoritative relationships with their victims. In the case of child sexual abuse, the rapist would be opportunistic, taking advantage of the carelessness of the parents and in this case of their desire to venture into the media.

Victims usually fear being disbelieved and judged by the public opinion. Usually, the society condemns the abuse but in turn questions the reason why the victim did not speak out before. Brazilian psychologist Flavia Dos Santos told Colombian newspaper El País that victims are usually convinced to speak when they are told that their statement will reduce the amount of future incidents. Victims usually feel helpless to know that their abusers are people with media power and as a result can act with impunity. Many of the later behaviors of the victims, such as guilt or imbalance in interpersonal relationships, were shown in the documentary An Open Secret, where victims narrate that sexual abuse has been assumed as part of the culture in Hollywood and for that reason nobody has worried about eradicating it.

== Theme in the 2016 United States presidential election ==
Sexual abuse as a result of having a position of power was one of the issues during the 2016 United States presidential election, particularly when in October of the same year, a month before the election, an audio recording was released that dated from 2005 in which Donald Trump, then the presidential candidate for the Republican Party, was heard boasting about how he used his power to sexually assault women; In the recording, Trump said of women, "when you're a star, they let you do anything. Grab them by the pussy."

That same day, Trump released a statement in which he apologized for the video's content, and said that he was "not perfect". Likewise, during the third presidential debate with Democratic candidate Hillary Rodham Clinton, he argued: "Nobody respects women more than me." Trump won the presidential election a month later, and the following year the production company Brave New Films presented a video that compiled the testimonies of 16 women who publicly accused Trump of harassing or sexually assaulting them.

In October 2017, former President Barack Obama and Hillary Clinton expressed their sympathy for victims of sexual abuse. Obama testified about the specific behavior of Harvey Weinstein, who had been a frequent donor to the Democratic Party, "Michelle and I are disgusted by the recent reports on Harvey Weinstein; any man who degrades women in that way should be condemned and held accountable, regardless of their wealth or condition."

== See also ==
- Catholic Church sexual abuse cases
- 2017–18 United States political sexual scandals
- Casting couch
- Operation Yewtree, British police investigation into sexual abuse committed by media figures
- QAnon, conspiracy theory
- Klaus Kinski#Sexual abuse allegations
- Epstein files
