= Super Time Force =

2014 video game

- Developer: Capybara Games
- Publisher: Capybara Games
- Composer: Jason DeGroot
- Platforms: Xbox 360, Xbox One, Microsoft Windows; PlayStation 4 PlayStation Vita; OS X Linux
- Release: Xbox 360, Xbox One; May 14, 2014; Microsoft Windows (Ultra); August 25, 2014; PlayStation 4, PlayStation Vita (Ultra); September 1, 2015; OS X, Linux (Ultra); August 16, 2016
- Genres: Action, Adventure, Shooter
- Mode: Single-player

Super Time Force is a side-scrolling action and shooter video game by Capybara Games. The game was released for the Xbox One and the Xbox 360 on May 14, 2014. The game was known for its ability for players to rewind themselves, using the "Time Out" game mechanic, back to an area where they started from when a character dies, and then resume their action alongside a ghost version of the original character. Its game mechanics and gameplay were inspired by other side-scrolling titles like Contra and Metal Slug with the abilities of time-travel.

The game was later released in an updated version entitled Super Time Force Ultra on the Xbox platforms, and Microsoft Windows through Steam and GOG.com on August 25, 2014, and on PlayStation 4 and PlayStation Vita on September 1, 2015. Since its release, the game has received critical acclaim and awards for its humorous storytelling, gameplay, and original game mechanics.

== Gameplay ==
Players have 30 lives to run through bullet hell levels. When the player dies or voluntarily ends the run, the player can view and rewind their timestream to revisit the life of a prior player-character's run or otherwise restart with a new run. There are over 16 different characters in each of the 6 stages with different weapons or powers of their own. In addition, the player can also use items like cloxs (clock items that reverse the time limit), shards (violet dust-like pixels that allow the player and the game's time limit to pass in slow motion; they are only visible if the player uses the "Time Out" mechanic) and glorbs (yellow diamond-shaped items that increase the player's number of lives by one, and are found on every level on certain areas or in enemies that are difficult to capture). Both shards and glorbs can be collected to unlock a new character when a certain number are obtained.

== Plot ==
Commander Repeatski sends the Super Time Force, a time-traveling military organization, to various points in history such as prehistoric times, the Middle Ages, and the future in order to make the present a better place to live.

== Development ==
The game stems from a three-day experiment at the Toronto, Ontario Game Jam in May 2011. The game jam event coalesced hundreds of Toronto-area game developers to build quick prototypes around a central theme: the phrase "what just happened." Kenneth Yeung of Capybara and artists Mike and Vic Nguyen brainstormed as a three-person team and decided to make a time-traveling side-scrolling shooter, "a Contra game where you can go back in time." This quickly became the core feature, where upon death, the player fought "alongside ghost versions of themselves doing what they had just done before they died." Dying created co-op partners of the player's recorded actions. Yeung described it as, "Gunstar Heroes meets that one level in Braid."

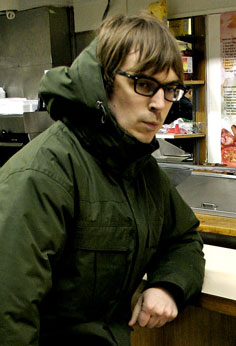
Composer Jason DeGroot

At first the team was hesitant and noncommittal about continuing the experiment, but later decided to proceed as a Friday side project. They added Greg Georgiadis as a designer and Jason DeGroot as a musician, and decided after 20 days of work to pursue the project seriously.

Capybara released a gameplay teaser trailer on October 17, 2011, without explaining the footage. Around the same time, Microsoft awarded the game the 2012 Independent Games Festival "XBLA Award", a deal to publish the game on Xbox Live Arcade. Capybara creative director Kris Piotrowski described the night as "a bit of a pinnacle moment" for the company and the risks it had taken. The deal did not have specific deadlines. The game debuted at PAX East 2012 without marketing. Capybara president Nathan Vella told Polygon that they wanted players to discover the game organically without having the concept spoiled. He also felt that the direct approach to gamers would create a small but loyal fan base, which the company preferred over broad marketing. By PAX Prime 2012, Capybara had removed mechanics where charging attacks depleted the time-life meter, and added multipliers (across multiple lives) for consecutive kills. In 2012, Super Time Force demos appeared at the Los Angeles iam8bit, Polygon's E3 party, and the annual Evolution fighting game tournament.

The core mechanic was redesigned by PAX East 2013. The game was easy for players who died often, as they would be helped by the ghosts, yet left experts at a disadvantage: improving at the game meant dying less and therefore using the ghost players (the core mechanics) less. The development team decided that players should be in control of time in order to make players use death strategically, and rethought the mechanic to let the player rewind and replay the lives of previous runs from a timeline upon death.

The game was delayed until its release on May 14, 2014, to the Xbox One. It was also released to Windows on August 25, 2014, and to the PlayStation platforms on September 1, 2015.

== Reception ==
Reception

Aggregate scores
Aggregator	Score
GameRankings	(PC) 90.00% (PS4) 82.00% (Vita) 87.50% (XONE) 82.00% (X360) 81.00%
Metacritic	(XONE) 80/100 (X360) 81/100 (PS4) 82/100 (PC) 80/100

Review scores
Publication	Score
Destructoid	9/10
Game Informer	8.5/10
GameSpot	8/10
GamesRadar+	4/5
IGN	7.5/10
Polygon	8/10
Engadget	4.5/5

Super Time Force received favorable reviews from critics for its story, characters, colorful pixelated graphics, references to pop culture, and the unique ability for players to rewind back where they left off after their character dies using its game mechanic on each level's area as its checkpoint.

Game Informer's Matt Miller praised its playability and explained, "the reimagining of how we perceive time in an action game is what makes it memorable." Critics have pointed out some mild flaws in that its repetitive life-saving throughout the game's time-out layers was seen somewhat confusing and overwhelming, but still found its gameplay an enjoyable experience. Kotaku commented that the game "[f]eels a lot more tactical and technically impressive than it initially appears", and also added that "[m]anipulating time in video games isn't a new thing, but the way that STF uses the gimmick feels fresh and clever. Rewinding and playing through a chunk of game over and over creates hectic layers of action. It's chaotic but beautiful."

Super Time Force won GameSpot's Game of the Month Award of May 2014. The press also added that the game "assumes a hilariously cavalier attitude about the rights and wrongs of fiddling with time, sending up every sci-fi time travel trope in the book". At the 2014 National Academy of Video Game Trade Reviewers (NAVGTR) awards, the game was nominated for Game Design, New IP.

Arthur Gies of Polygon was impressed by its often nonsensical narrative and concept and described it as "The dumbest smart shooter I've ever played. The face it wears is the goofy nostalgist that can't be serious for even a moment, sure. But Capy's implementation of time travel and control is inspired enough to shine new light on even its most tired-but-excellently-executed inspirations." In a 2013 interview with ScrewAttack at PAX, Capybara president Nathan Vella was asked about the game's character Zackasaurus sharing some resemblance to late 1980s and early 1990s personas. Vella explained that the character Poochie from The Simpsons' sketch series The Itchy & Scratchy Show might be an inspiration for the character.

Jordan Devore of Destructoid quoted "A satisfying run-and-gun game made even better with a fun (and funny!) take on time travel." He continued, "You'll likely be able to burn through the game in a few hours if you're not going for full completion, but it has such a winning personality that you'll find yourself coming back for more."

== Legacy ==
Super Time Force Ultra, abbreviated as STFU, was released on August 25, 2014. It features over 50 mission levels via the "Helladeck"; the Steam version of the game features guest characters owned by Valve, such as the Pyro and Saxton Hale from Team Fortress 2 and Zoey from Left 4 Dead. The PlayStation 4 and PlayStation Vita version of Ultra features Sony Computer Entertainment chairman Shuhei Yoshida as a playable character along with The Traveler from Journey and Sir Galahad from The Order: 1886.

Jean Rambois makes a cameo appearance in Mercenary Kings when the player can encounter him and receive a new weapon, while Zackasaurus appears in Indivisible as a playable character. Several characters from Super Time Force are also featured as part of a downloadable skin pack for the sandbox game Minecraft.
