= Iam8bit =

American video game and art publisher

iam8bit, Inc.
- Logo used from 2016
- Type: Private
- Industry: Entertainment industry
- Founded: April 19, 2005; 21 years ago
- Founder: Jon M. Gibson
- Headquarters: Los Angeles, California, U.S.
- Number of locations: 2 offices (2016)
- Area served: Worldwide
- Key people: Amanda White (producer)
- Website: iam8bit.com

iam8bit, Inc. is an American merchandising company, video game publisher, and artist collective based in Los Angeles, California. iam8bit hosts an online store that primarily sells collectible vinyl records of video game soundtracks, but also sells t-shirts, artwork, pins and other merchandise. The company also owns an art gallery in Los Angeles that hosts various exhibitions annually.

== History ==
iam8bit began as an art show surrounding pop culture fandom in 2005. The event, and subsequent company of the same name, were created and founded by video game and tech journalist Jon M. Gibson, and film director Amanda White, who is also known for producing the mockumentary I'm Still Here.

After its inception as an art event, iam8bit became a full-fledged lifestyle brand, focused on the artistic side of gaming. Beginning with a collection of "limited edition" T-shirts adorned with popular images from the exhibition, the company would go on to design events and merchandising for other companies.

Chronicle Books published an official collection of pieces from the inaugural show in April 2005 entitled, iam8bit: Art Inspired by Classic Videogames of the '80s, and was promptly carried in stores like Urban Outfitters, Barnes & Noble, Giant Robot, and many other museum and boutique shops. A sequel to the book, called SUPER i am 8-bit: More Art Inspired by Classic Videogames of the '80s, was published by Insight Editions in June 2010.

iam8bit, as a merchandising brand, started off with a collection of limited edition T-shirts adorned with popular images from the art exhibit. The company would branch out to be a collectible vinyl records in 2010, with the promotion of Disney's video game Tron: Evolution.

A partnership with Blik, a manufacturer of vinyl wall decals, was formed after the company created a custom, large-scale window installation for iam8bit's office. The result was a series of removable Space Invader-style wall stickers that, after several years, had been a consistently selling product for Blik. In 2007, iam8bit formed another partnership with Couch Guitar Straps to create a line of straps created for use with Guitar Hero and Rock Band.

For New Line's 2008 DVD release of The King of Kong: A Fistful of Quarters, iam8bit produced numerous supplemental features, including the "iam8bit Music & Gallery," which featured Donkey Kong-inspired art from the first three years of the iam8bit art show, as well as an accompanying soundtrack by renowned micro-musicians like 8 Bit Weapon, ComputeHer, and others. For this DVD, Gibson, as a writer and producer, and director Gabe Swarr also created an original, one-minute animated short, entitled A Really, Really Brief History of Donkey Kong, featuring music by 8 Bit Weapon, which received both critical and fan praise. Gibson, along with IGN Entertainment Editorial Director Chris Carle, provided a full-length commentary track recounting the cultural and historical significance of the 1980s arcade scene.

== Productions ==
=== Mega Man 9 Press Kit (2008) ===
In 2008, iam8bit was hired by Capcom to create the cover artwork for Mega Man 9. The cover art, done by Gerald de Jesus (part of the iam8bit artist collective), was made to be similar the American box art of the original Mega Man game, often considered to be "ugly" by the fanbase. According to Chris Kramer, Senior Director of Communications and Community at Capcom Entertainment, "the marketing group [decided] if we were going to release a game that looked like it came from 1987 that we should run the whole marketing campaign as if we were working in the games industry in 1987".

A "limited edition" press kit using that cover art was then created by iam8bit. Being as faithful to the original 1987 release as possible, the iam8bit crew disassembled hundreds of vintage Nintendo Entertainment System cartridges, magnetized them, and inserted mini "asset" CDs inside, featuring an array of screenshots, character art, etc. originally intended for members of the media, but later sold to fans via the online Capcom Store. The cartridges were then packaged in a custom-created, classic-looking Nintendo Entertainment System box, complete with shrink-wrap and bargain bin price tags (i.e. "SALE $9.99"). The fanfare for the press kit resulted in eBay listings of upwards of $1,200, making it one of the most sought-after promotional items in video game history.

=== Tricell Progenitor Virus Detection Kit (2009) ===
In March 2009, the Tricell Progenitor Virus Detection Kit was created to promote the release of Resident Evil 5 on Xbox 360 and PlayStation 3. The kit, designed to look like an off-the-shelf pregnancy tester, was sent to select news reporters and members of video game/technology media, and later sold in limited quantities to consumers via the Capcom Store. The box lacks all Capcom or iam8bit company branding, focusing only on the fictional corporation of Tricell from within Resident Evil 5.

Inside of the kit had Tricell-branded protective nitrile gloves, surgical mask, hand sanitizer, and a bio-hazard bag, as well as a two "Advanced Detection & Suppression Technology Discs". Inserting the discs into the console had a fictitious anti-virus detector "analyze" your system, detecting various levels of infection with the Progenitor virus.

=== Tron Evolution Vinyl (2010) ===
In promotion for the release of the 2010 video game "Tron: Evolution," iam8bit Productions produced a custom vinyl picture disc that was sent out to an exclusive list of journalists. Only 200 vinyls were reportedly printed, featuring some of the game's soundtrack produced by DJ Sascha Dikiciyan, and visual design by artist Jim Rugg.

=== Marvel VS Capcom 3 Fight Club LA (2011) ===
Days before the launch of Marvel VS Capcom 3: Fate of Two Worlds, iam8bit held another "Fight Club" event, which hosted over 1,500 fans and featured an almost complete version of the game. It was also the first public demo location to have the Nintendo 3DS handheld, featuring Super Street Fighter IV: 3D Edition.

=== I'm With Coco (2010) ===
In January 2010, in collaboration with artist Mike Mitchell, iam8bit took part in the viral sensation "I'm With Coco" (the original image was created by Mitchell).

=== The Legend of Zelda 25th Anniversary – Hyrule Room (2011) ===
To commemorate The Legend of Zelda's 25th Anniversary, Nintendo of America enlisted the help of iam8bit to create a Zelda style conference room in their Redwood City, California headquarters. The design and artwork for the conference room was done by Gerald de Jesus, and featured various references to the series' games.

=== Alita: Battle Angel – Passport to Iron City (2019) ===
In February 2019, Twentieth Century Fox collaborated with iam8bit to create "Passport to Iron City", a recreation of Alita: Battle Angel's setting for fans to tour. "Passport to Iron City" was available in New York City, Los Angeles, and Austin, Texas.

== Exhibitions ==
The iam8bit art exhibition is produced annually and held in Los Angeles. Featured artists include Gary Baseman, James Jean, Tim Biskup, Seen, Luke Chueh, Joe Ledbetter, Jorge R. Gutierrez, and Amy Sol.

Year	Show Date	Location	Official Title
2005	April 18 – May 19	Gallery Nineteen Eighty Eight	
2006	April 18 – May 19	Gallery Nineteen Eighty Eight	
2007	April 17 – May 12	Gallery Nineteen Eighty Eight	
2008	August 14 – September 7	World of Wonder Storefront Gallery	
2011	August 11 – September 10	iam8bit Gallery (2147 W. Sunset Blvd)	
2013	June 7 – 30	iam8bit Gallery (2147 W. Sunset Blvd)	iam8bit Entertainment System
2015	June 18 – July 5	iam8bit Gallery (2147 W. Sunset Blvd)	iam8bit: 10th Anniversary
2017	June 13 – 25	iam8bit Gallery (2147 W. Sunset Blvd)	iam8bit: A Love Story

== Games published ==
Title	Original release	Developer(s)	Additional publisher(s)	Genre(s)	Platform(s)	Ref.
Aladdin	1993	Virgin Games	Nighthawk Interactive	Platform	Sega Genesis	
Another Crab's Treasure	2024	Aggro Crab	Aggro Crab	Soulslike	PlayStation 5, Nintendo Switch	
The Artful Escape	2021	Beethoven & Dinosaur	Annapurna Interactive	Platform	PlayStation 5, Nintendo Switch	
Battletoads	1991	Rare	Xbox Game Studios	Beat 'em up	Nintendo Entertainment System	
Bear and Breakfast	2022	Gummy Cat	Armor Games Studios	Management simulation	Nintendo Switch	
Behind the Frame: The Finest Scenery	2021	Silver Lining Studio	Akupara Games, Akatsuki Taiwan	Adventure	PlayStation 4, Nintendo Switch	
Bomb Rush Cyberfunk	2023	Team Reptile	Team Reptile	Action-adventure, platform	PlayStation 4, PlayStation 5, Xbox One, Xbox Series X, Nintendo Switch	
Carto	2020	Sunhead Games	Humble Games	Puzzle	PlayStation 4, Nintendo Switch	
Cocoon	2023	Geometric Interactive	Annapurna Interactive	Adventure, puzzle	PlayStation 5, Nintendo Switch	
Cozy Grove	2021	Spry Fox	The Quantum Astrophysicists Guild	Adventure, simulation	PlayStation 5, Nintendo Switch	
Creature in the Well	2019	Flight School Studio, NWM Interactive	Flight School Studio	Action, dungeon crawler	PlayStation 4, Nintendo Switch	
Cuphead	2017	Studio MDHR	Studio MDHR	Run-and-gun	PlayStation 4, Xbox One, Nintendo Switch	
Disco Elysium: The Final Cut	2019	ZA/UM	ZA/UM	Role-playing	PlayStation 4, PlayStation 5, Xbox One, Nintendo Switch	
Donut County	2018	Ben Esposito	Annapurna Interactive	Puzzle	PlayStation 4, Nintendo Switch	
Earthworm Jim 1+2	1994/1995	Shiny Entertainment	Interplay Entertainment	Run-and-gun	Super NES	
Eastward	2021	Pixpil	Chucklefish	Action-adventure	Nintendo Switch	
Etherborn	2019	Altered Matter	Akupara Games	Adventure, puzzle	PlayStation 4, Nintendo Switch	
Five Nights at Freddy's: Into the Pit	2025	Mega Cat Studios	ScottGames	Role-playing, adventure, horror	PlayStation 4, PlayStation 5, Xbox One, Xbox Series X, Nintendo Switch	
Five Nights at Freddy's: Secret of the Mimic	2025	Steel Wool Studios	ScottGames	Survival horror	PlayStation 5	
Garbage Pail Kids: Mad Mike and the Quest for Stale Gum	2022	Retrotainment Games, Digital Eclipse	None	Platform	Windows, PlayStation 4, Xbox One, Nintendo Switch, Nintendo Entertainment System	
Gone Home	2013	The Fullbright Company	Annapurna Interactive	Adventure	Nintendo Switch	
Gorogoa	2017	Buried Signal	Annapurna Interactive	Puzzle	PlayStation 4, Nintendo Switch	
Grim Fandango Remastered	2015	Double Fine Productions	Double Fine Productions	Adventure	PlayStation 4, Nintendo Switch	
Grindstone	2019	Capybara Games	Capybara Games	Puzzle, adventure	Nintendo Switch	
Hyper Light Drifter	2016	Heart Machine	Heart Machine	Action role-playing	PlayStation 4	
Inside	2016	Playdead	Playdead	Puzzle, platform	PlayStation 4	
Kentucky Route Zero: TV Edition	2020	Cardboard Computer	Annapurna Interactive	Adventure	PlayStation 4, Nintendo Switch	
Lies of P: Complete Edition	2026	Neowiz, Nough	Neowiz	Action role-playing	Nintendo Switch 2	
The Lion King	1994	Westwood Studios	Nighthawk Interactive	Platform	Super Nintendo Entertainment System	
Manifold Garden	2019	William Chyr Studio	William Chyr Studio	Puzzle	PlayStation 5, Nintendo Switch	
Mega Man 2	1988	Capcom	Capcom	Action, platform	Nintendo Entertainment System	
Mega Man X	1993	Capcom	Capcom	Action, platform	Super Nintendo Entertainment System	
Mutazione	2019	Die Gute Fabrik	Akupara Games	Adventure	PlayStation 4, Nintendo Switch	
Neon White	2022	Angel Matrix	Annapurna Interactive	First-person shooter, platform	PlayStation 5, Nintendo Switch	
Ori and the Blind Forest: Definitive Edition	2015	Moon Studios	Xbox Game Studios	Metroidvania	Microsoft Windows, Xbox One, Nintendo Switch	
Ori and the Will of the Wisps	2020	Moon Studios	Xbox Game Studios	Metroidvania	Microsoft Windows, Xbox One, Nintendo Switch	
Ori: The Collection	2021	Moon Studios	Xbox Game Studios	Metroidvania	Nintendo Switch	
Outer Wilds: Archeologist Edition	2019	Mobius Digital	Annapurna Interactive	Action-adventure	PlayStation 5, Nintendo Switch	
The Pathless	2020	Giant Squid	Annapurna Interactive	Action-adventure	PlayStation 5, Nintendo Switch	
Psychonauts	2005	Double Fine Productions	Double Fine Productions, Limited Run Games	Platform	PlayStation 4, Xbox One	
Psychonauts 2	2021	Double Fine Productions	Xbox Game Studios	Platform	PlayStation 4, Xbox One, Xbox Series X/S	
Rez Infinite	2016	Enhance Games, Resonair, Monstars	Enhance Games	Music	PlayStation 4	
Sayonara Wild Hearts	2019	Simogo	Annapurna Interactive	Action, music	PlayStation 4, Nintendo Switch	
Schim	2024	Ewoud van der Werf	Extra Nice	Platform	PlayStation 5, Nintendo Switch	
Sea of Stars	2023	Sabotage Studio	Sabotage Studio	Role-playing	PlayStation 4, PlayStation 5, Xbox One, Xbox Series X, Nintendo Switch	
Slime Rancher 2	2025	Monomi Park	Monomi Park	Farm life sim	PlayStation 5, Xbox Series X	
Spinch	2020	Queen Bee Games	Akupara Games	Platform	Nintendo Switch	
Spiritfarer	2020	Thunder Lotus Games	Thunder Lotus Games	Management simulator	PlayStation 4, Nintendo Switch	
The Stanley Parable: Ultra Deluxe	2022	Crows Crows Crows	Crows Crows Crows	Adventure	PlayStation 5, Nintendo Switch	
Stray	2022	BlueTwelve Studio	Annapurna Interactive	Adventure	PlayStation 4, PlayStation 5	
Street Fighter II	1991	Capcom	Capcom	Fighting	Super Nintendo Entertainment System	
Telling Lies	2019	Sam Barlow, Furious Bee	Annapurna Interactive	Interactive film	PlayStation 4	
Toem	2021	Something We Made	Something We Made	Photography	PlayStation 5, Nintendo Switch	
Untitled Goose Game	2019	House House	Panic	Stealth	PlayStation 4, Nintendo Switch	
Wattam	2019	Funomena	Annapurna Interactive	Puzzle, platform	PlayStation 4	
We Are OFK	2022	Team OFK	Team OFK	Visual novel, music	PlayStation 5, Nintendo Switch	
What Remains of Edith Finch	2017	Giant Sparrow	Annapurna Interactive	Adventure	PlayStation 4	
What the Golf?	2019	Triband	Triband	Sports	Nintendo Switch	
