= The Brink of War =

2026 film by Michael Russell Gunn

- Theatrical release poster
- Directed by: Michael Russell Gunn
- Written by: Michael Russell Gunn
- Produced by: Michael Russell Gunn; John Logan Pierson
- Starring: Jeff Daniels; Jared Harris; J. K. Simmons
- Cinematography: Magdalena Górka
- Edited by: Mike Sale; Laura Yanovich
- Music by: Austin Wintory
- Production companies: SK Global; 2521 Entertainment
- Distributed by: Angel Studios
- Release date: August 14, 2026
- Running time: 117 minutes
- Country: United States
- Language: English
- Box office: $5 million

The Brink of War is a 2026 American historical political drama film written and directed by Michael Russell Gunn in his feature directorial debut. Set during the Reykjavík Summit, it stars Jeff Daniels, Jared Harris, and J. K. Simmons.

The film was released on August 14, 2026, and received positive reviews from critics.

== Plot ==
Amidst the Cold War in 1986, U.S. president Ronald Reagan and Soviet general secretary Mikhail Gorbachev agree to an informal summit at Reykjavík, Iceland, with the aim of managing simmering geopolitical tensions and nuclear proliferation. In private, however, both sides bear differing interests: Reagan aims to discuss arms control and human rights in the Soviet Union, while Gorbachev aims to resolve the nuclear stalemate in order to bolster domestic socio-economic reforms.

On the summit's first day, October 11, the two statesmen meet at Höfði, where Gorbachev surprises Reagan by proposing arms reduction instead of the expected arms control. In a one-on-one meeting, Reagan initially voices his concerns over human rights inside the Soviet Union and submits a plea on behalf of Soviet defector and cellist Mstislav Rostropovich, who wishes for his sister to visit him in the U.S. While Gorbachev agrees to consider the plea, he debates control over strategic arms and the ABM Treaty. Observing the presence of both U.S. and Soviet IRBM forces across Europe, Gorbachev proposes a bilateral consensus to reduce all IRBMs in Europe to zero, while allowing other NATO countries to retain their nuclear weapons. However, both sides are unable to agree on the balance of nuclear posturing in the Pacific. Outside the negotiations, Gorbachev's wife, Raisa, attracts considerable press attention during her own cultural excursion of Iceland, much to the annoyance of Reagan's wife, Nancy, who had remained in the U.S.

After a brief pause, both sides expand talks to include U.S. secretary of state George Shultz and Soviet foreign minister Eduard Shevardnadze. The Soviets extend their proposal to reduce strategic offensive weapons across both the U.S. and Soviet nuclear triads by 50%. However, the talks momentarily sour when both sides debate political issues — Reagan highlights popular disillusionment towards the Soviet government to which Gorbachev counters by referring Reagan's 1981 assassination attempt — an event that Reagan is seen to be privately struggling with; nevertheless, the mood later returns to normal. Before talks are adjourned for the day, Reagan subtly hints to Gorbachev about eliminating all nuclear weapons, but demurs on Gorbachev's request to discuss the Strategic Defense Initiative (SDI), the U.S.-proposed missile defence programme.

On the summit's second day, October 12, the talks briefly sour again when Reagan remains insistent on voicing Soviet human rights violations, specifically on the refusal to grant emigration for refuseniks, which stretches into a bout of geopolitical whataboutery. In private, Shultz advises Reagan to focus only on arms reduction, warning that his continued insistence on other issues could capsize the deal.

Both sides later reconvene, agreeing to a drawdown of land-based IRBM forces in Europe over a 10-year period. However, Gorbachev remains insistent on discussing SDI, wary that it could be used to deter any Soviet retaliation attempt under a hypothetical U.S. first strike scenario. Reagan refuses, arguing that SDI is necessary to protect the U.S. and its allies against a rogue launch. Instead, Reagan impulsively offers to trade SDI technology to the Soviets, but Gorbachev is incredulous and highlights the U.S. stranglehold over technological trade with the Soviet Union. Exhausted, Reagan agrees not to deploy the SDI for the 10-year period but insists on its practical testing, but Gorbachev counters by limiting it only to theoretical testing in a laboratory, which Reagan cannot accept.

Unable to resolve the deadlock, Gorbachev ends the summit. While Reagan is lamenting its failure, Shultz attempts to encourage him, but deduces that Reagan's true intentions all along were not specifically arms control - but rather to herald the end of the Soviet Union itself - noting that the country's political system is no longer stable. Invigorated, Shultz advises Reagan to persuade Gorbachev to accept Rostropovich's plea to have his sister visit him, on the condition that she too would not defect; Gorbachev agrees, and the two men shake hands. At the film's ending, Shultz breaks the fourth wall and elucidates that despite the summit's initial receipt of suspicion, it paved the way for the 1987 IRNF Treaty, coupled with the fall of the Soviet Union in 1991, just as Reagan had foreseen; Shultz also mentions Gorbachev's one-word comment on the beginning of the Cold War's end: Reykjavík.

== Cast ==
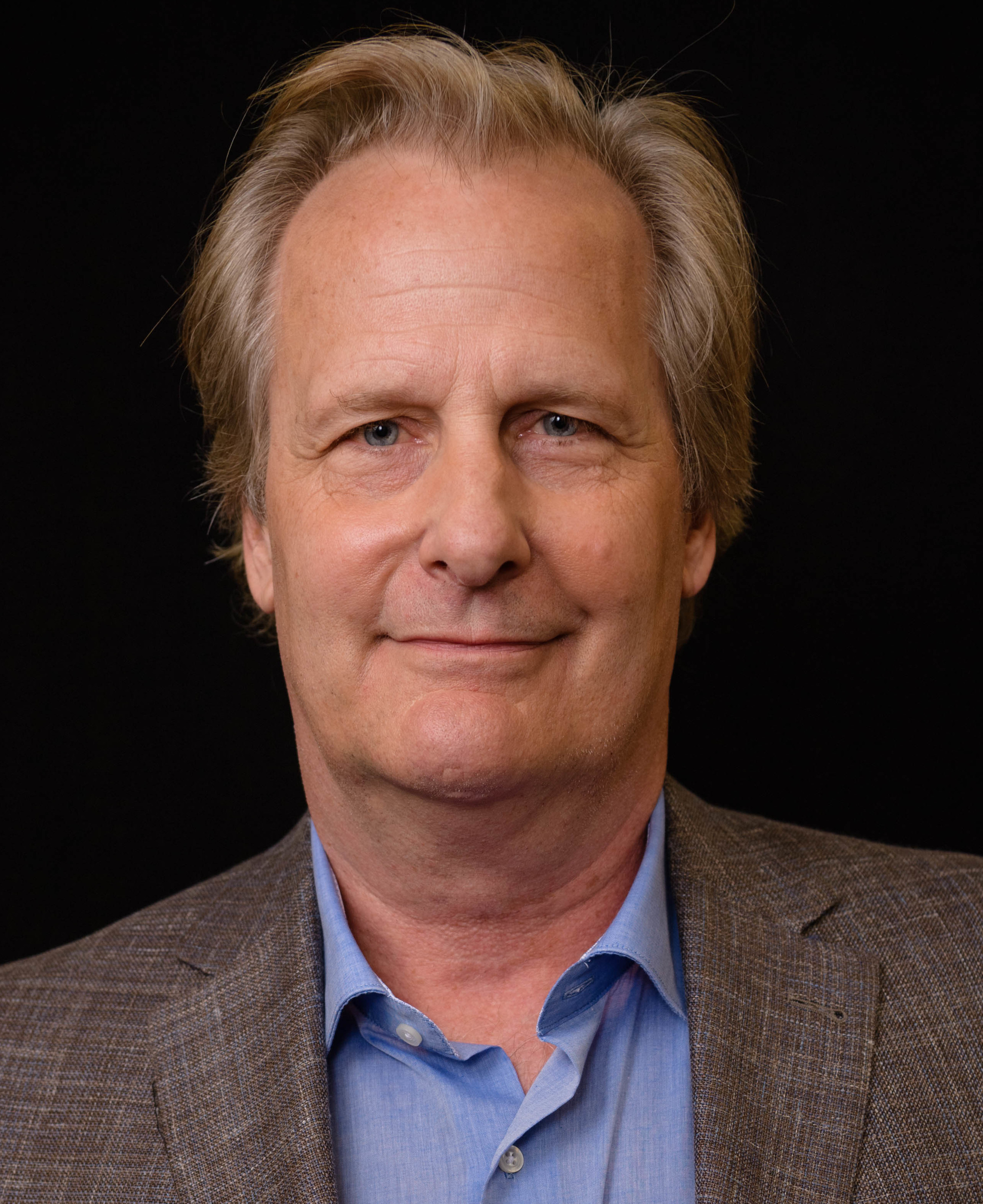
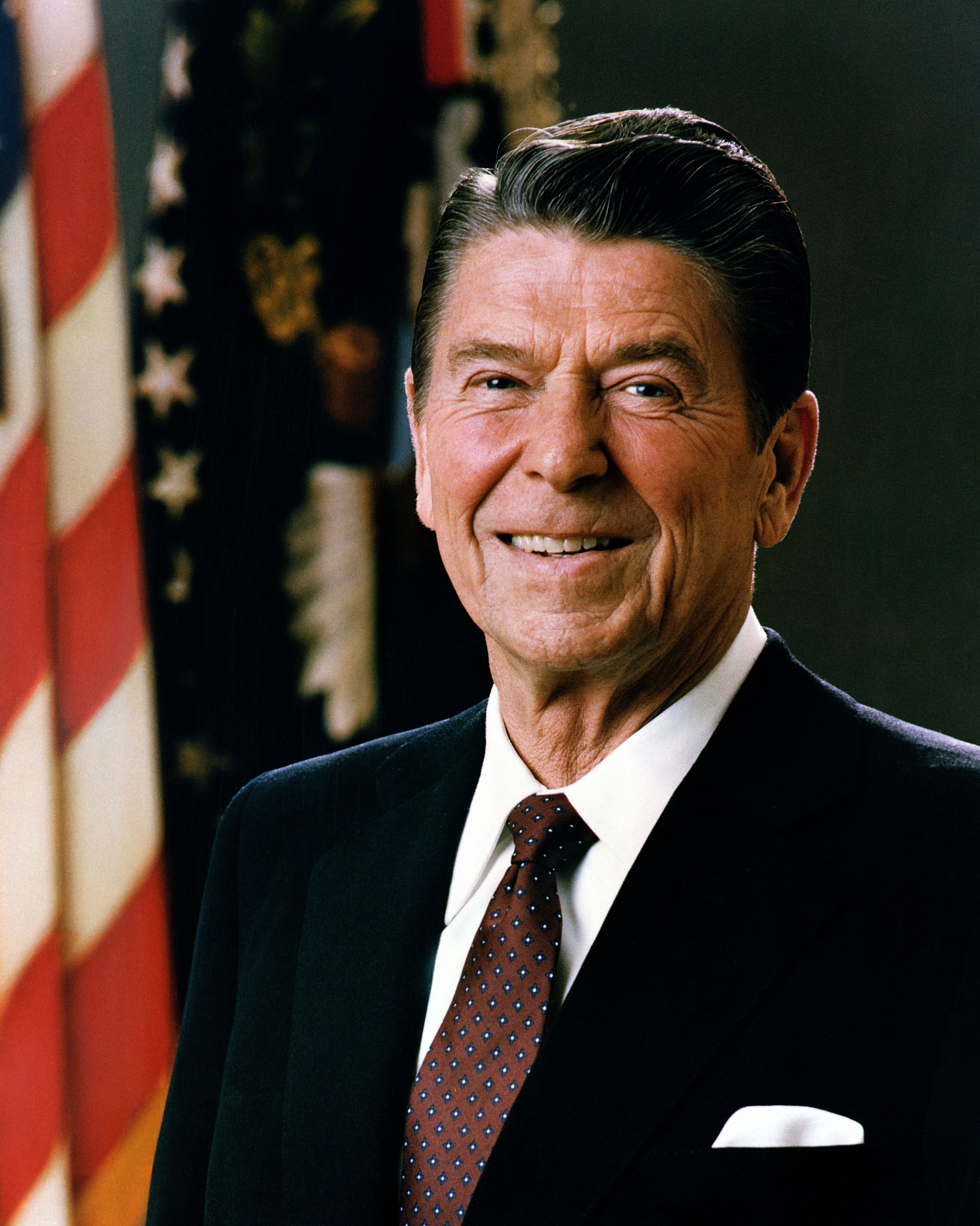
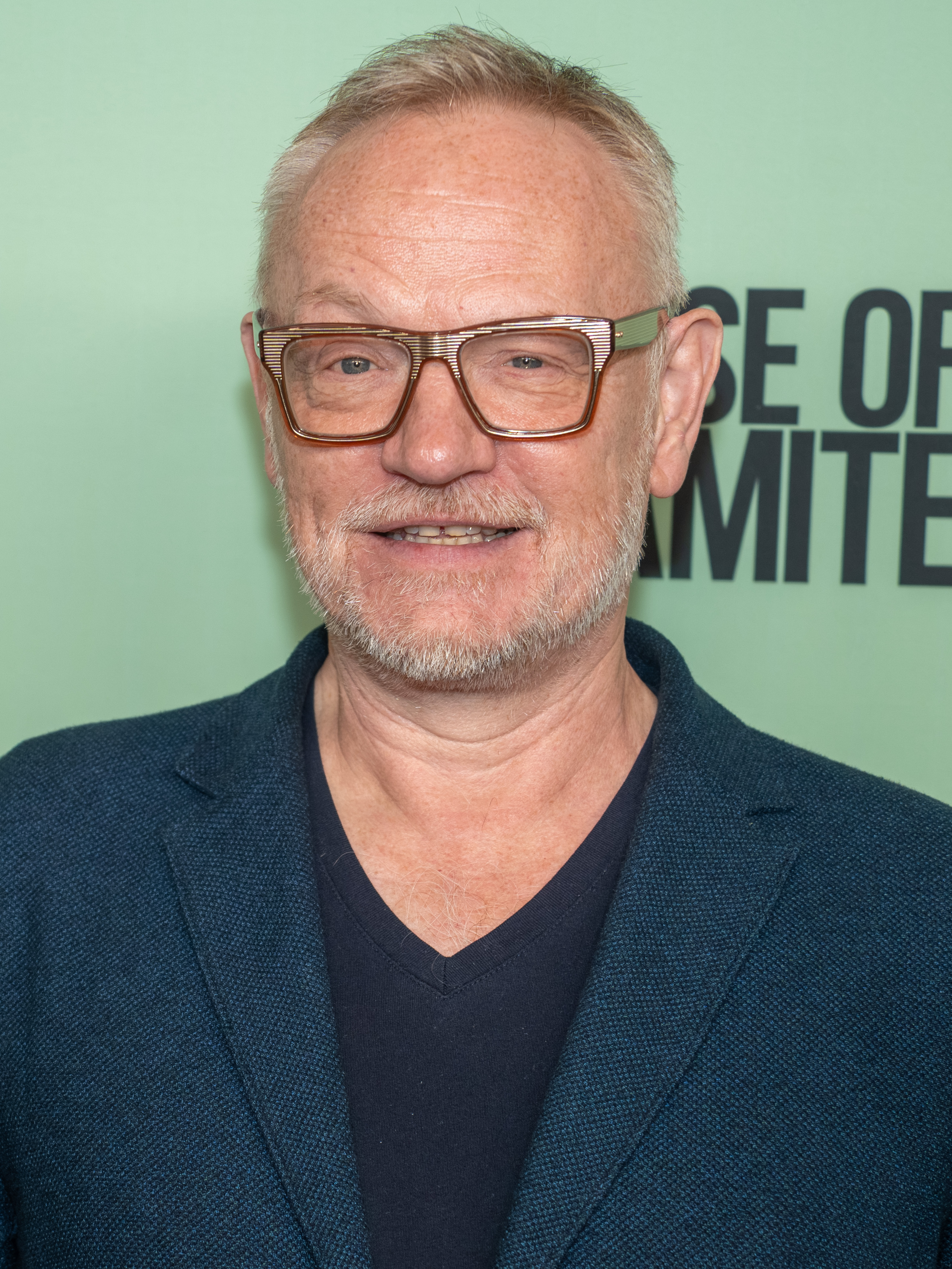
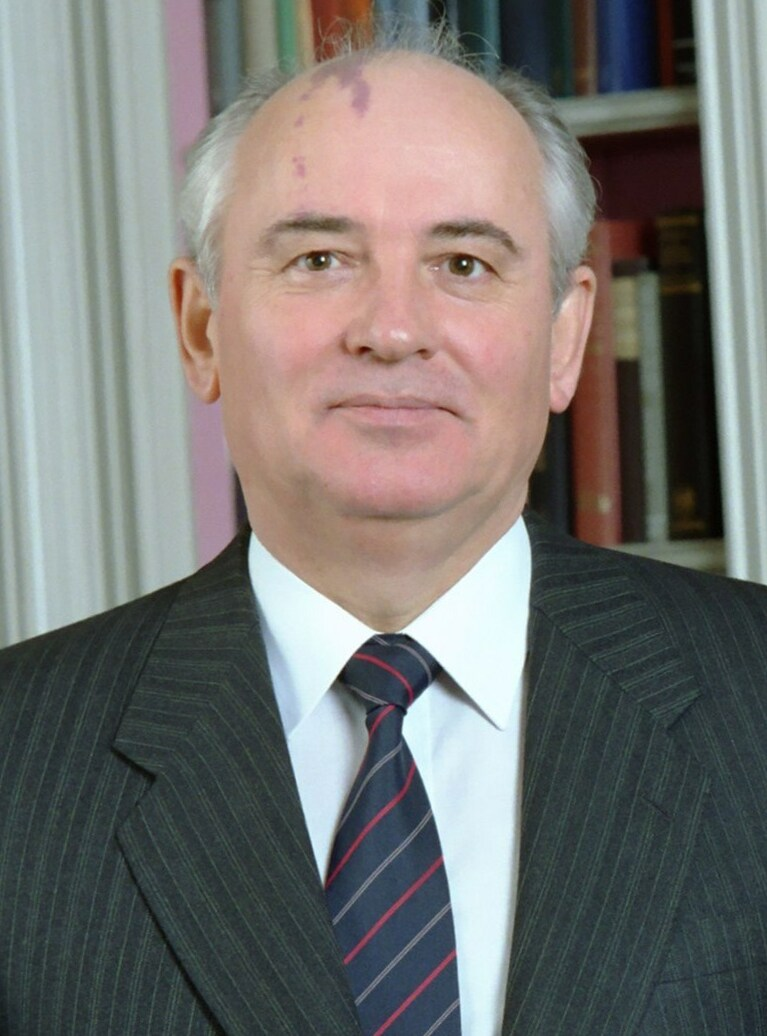
Jeff Daniels (top left) plays Ronald Reagan (top right). Jared Harris (bottom left) plays Mikhail Gorbachev (bottom right).

United States

- Jeff Daniels as Ronald Reagan, the 40th President of the United States.
- J. K. Simmons as George Shultz, the U.S. Secretary of State.
- Hope Davis as Nancy Reagan, the First Lady of the United States.
- Stephen Brennan as Paul Nitze, Reagan's advisor on arms control and head of the U.S. negotiating team at Reykjavík.
- John Ross Bowie as Kenneth Adelman, member of the U.S. negotiating team at Reykjavík.
- Adrian Rawlins as Max Kampelman, member of the U.S. negotiating team at Reykjavík.
- Jóhannes Haukur Jóhannesson as Richard Perle, member of the U.S. negotiating team at Reykjavík.

Soviet Union

- Jared Harris as Mikhail Gorbachev, the final General Secretary of the Communist Party of the Soviet Union.
- Branka Katić as Raisa Gorbacheva, Mikhail Gorbachev's wife.
- Tim Dutton as Eduard Shevardnadze, the Soviet Minister of Foreign Affairs.
- Vladimir Kulich as Sergey Akhromeyev, Marshal of the Soviet Union and the head of the Soviet negotiating team at Reykjavík.

Others

- Aya Cash as Cleo, a journalist from National Public Radio.
- Guy Burnet as Alexander, a journalist from The Times.

== Production ==
=== Development ===
Writer-director Michael Russell Gunn spent several years conducting research for the film. He interviewed former Secretary of State George Shultz before his 2021 death, and was also given transcripts from the 1986 summit.

=== Casting ===
Jeff Daniels, Jared Harris, and J. K. Simmons joined the cast on August 5, 2024. Hope Davis, Branka Katić, and Aya Cash joined the cast on October 15, 2024. Guy Burnet, John Ross Bowie, Adrian Rawlins, and Jóhannes Haukur Jóhannesson were announced as cast members on October 29, 2024. In addition to ten main actors, the film employed over 100 supporting actors.

=== Filming ===
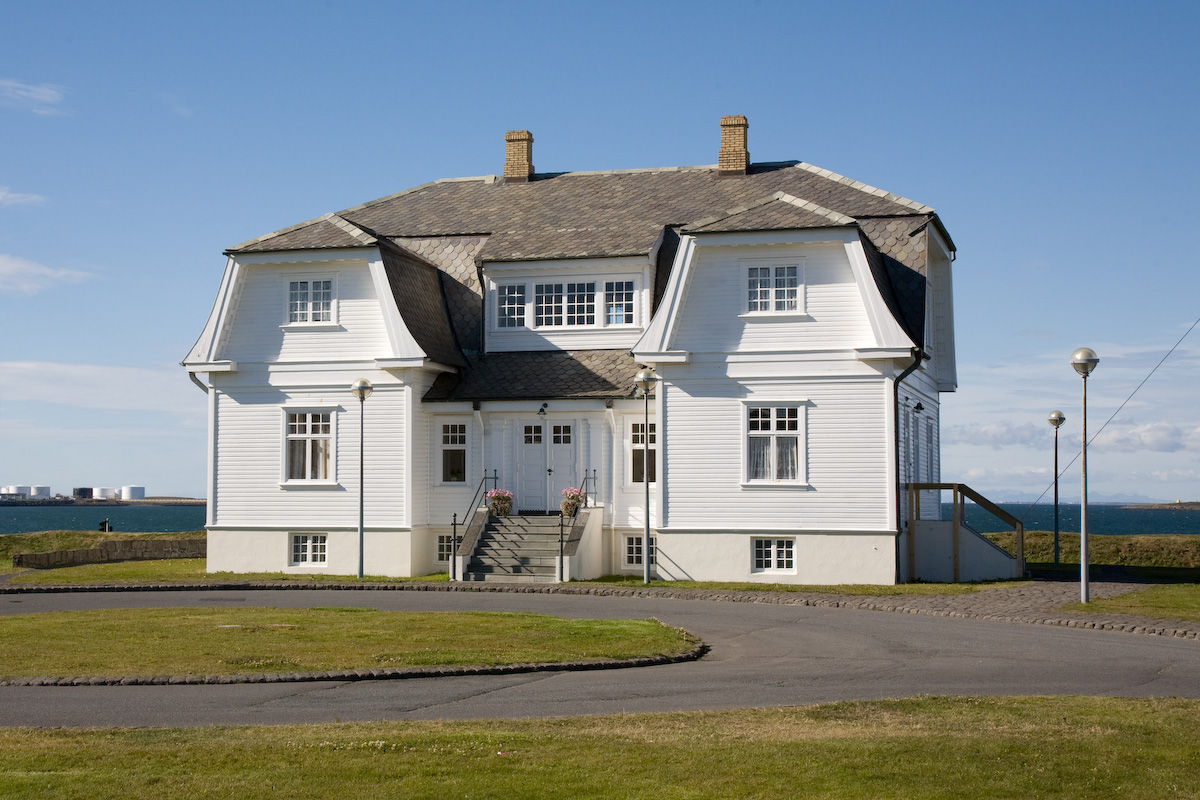
The majority of the film was shot at Höfði, the actual site of the Reykjavík Summit.

Gunn used Iceland's production rebate program to film on location. Principal photography began on October 15, 2024, in Reykjavík. The majority of filming took place at Höfði, the actual site of the 1986 summit, which cost 6.3 million kr to rent from the city of Reykjavík. Sæbraut, a local road in the city, was closed for filming purposes on October 19 and 26, 2024. Additional filming locations included the Blue Lagoon, Skeggjastaðir, Mosfellsdalur, and Reykjanes. Filming was expected to be completed by mid-November 2024. Magdalena Górka served as the film's cinematographer.

Pete Souza, who photographed the 1986 summit, also conducted the on-set photography for the film.

== Release ==
The Brink of War was released by Angel Studios on August 14, 2026. It made $1,124,995 on its first day, debuting at sixth place; it went on to gross $2,689,529 in its opening weekend.

== Reception ==
On the review aggregator website Rotten Tomatoes, 71% of 49 critics' reviews are positive, with an average rating of 6.6/10. Metacritic, which uses a weighted average, assigned the film a score of 51 out of 100, based on 11 critics, indicating "mixed or average" reviews. Audiences polled by CinemaScore gave the film an average grade of "A" on an A+ to F scale.

Glenn Kenny of The New York Times wrote, "What pleasure and intrigue the movie has is provided by its top-billed cast. As Reagan, Daniels builds a characterization from traits — resolutely-set jaw, occasionally twinkly eyes — buttressing Gunn's hagiographic vision of the former president."

Richard Roeper of RogerEbert.com gave the film two-and-a-half out of four stars, writing, "Daniels doesn't look like the 40th president and doesn't really nail the actor-turned-politician's distinctive vocal cadence, but it's an effective performance nonetheless."
