= Might & Magic: Clash of Heroes =

2009 role-playing video game

- North American Nintendo DS box art
- Developers: Capybara Games; Tag Games (iOS/Android); Dotemu (Definitive Edition)
- Publishers: Ubisoft; Capybara Games (iOS); Dotemu (Definitive Edition)
- Writers: Jeff Spock; Dan Vader
- Series: Might and Magic
- Platforms: Nintendo DS, PlayStation 3, Xbox 360, Windows, iOS, Android, Nintendo Switch, PlayStation 4
- Release: December 1, 2009: Nintendo DS; NA: December 1, 2009; EU: February 26, 2010 PlayStation 3; NA: April 12, 2011; PAL: April 13, 2011 Xbox 360 April 13, 2011 Windows September 22, 2011 iOS January 24, 2013 Android June 27, 2013 Switch, PS4 (Definitive Edition) July 20, 2023
- Genres: Puzzle, adventure, role-playing
- Modes: Single-player, multiplayer

Might & Magic: Clash of Heroes is a puzzle role-playing video game developed by Capybara Games and published by Ubisoft for the Nintendo DS. Part of the Might and Magic series, it was first released in December 2009 in North America and February 2010 in Europe. In 2011, a downloadable high definition version was developed for the PlayStation 3, Xbox 360 and Microsoft Windows. Android and iOS ports developed by Tag Games were developed in 2013. A remake, titled Might & Magic: Clash of Heroes – Definitive Edition, developed and published by Dotemu, was released for the Nintendo Switch, PlayStation 4 and Windows in July 2023.

== Gameplay ==
Previews of the title likened its gameplay model to those of Puzzle Quest and Critter Crunch. Borrowing elements from the Heroes of Might and Magic franchise, it combines elements of the role-playing, turn-based strategy and puzzle video game genres, allowing players to embark on story-based and optional quests, while employing army recruitment and resource management. Five of the eight playable factions featured in Heroes of Might and Magic V – the Haven, Inferno, Sylvan, Academy and Necropolis – comprise the game's forces, though their troop lineups are not replicated from Heroes V. Instead, armies are made up of an unlimited number of faction-specific basic troops, as well as a finite number of larger "elite" units. Each faction has three types of basic troops, and five types of more advanced troops, with players selecting from these to form their individual army compositions.

The player controls individual heroes representative of each faction, each of whom act as avatars in alternating exploration and battle phases, growing in experience and obtaining new abilities as the game progresses. The game's producers described battles as the center of the game, and these battles are turn-based. Battles take place using two separate grids of troops, with enemy troops being shown on the top screen, while friendly troops are shown on the bottom screen. Each turn, players have a number of moves (generally three) with which to move individual units around on the grid (battlefield) in an effort to stack similarly colored units vertically. When the correct number of units of the same color are stacked, the units begin charging for an attack which will execute some number of turns later. If the charging units are not destroyed prior to the beginning of their attack, the attack launches vertically towards the opponent's army, interacting with any enemy units which are in the way, and possibly striking the enemy leader or hero as well.

Equippable artifacts, some returning from Heroes V, are also involved in gameplay; these modify troop or hero abilities during combat. Lastly, a multiplayer mode is also included, featuring two playable heroes in DS Download Play mode, and all ten heroes in DS Wireless Play mode.

== Plot ==
The game is the third title set in the series' Ubisoft continuity, and acts as a prequel to Heroes of Might and Magic V, taking place in the fictional world of Ashan prior to the events of the game (producers Erwan Le Breton and Romain de Waubert have noted it as 40 years before the cycle of Heroes V and Dark Messiah of Might and Magic, averaging at 946 YSD in the timeline).

The game's story mode centers on its five main protagonists: Godric, Aidan, Anwen, Nadia and Fiona, who command knights, demons, elves, wizards and necromancers respectively. Godric and Anwen previously appeared as playable characters in Heroes V, while further returning characters shown in screenshots include Cyrus, Findan and Markal. The protagonists have been described as five lost children whose lives are shattered by "a mysterious Demon Lord with very sinister motives". This demon lord turns out to be Azh Rafir, Nadia's father, who had devised a mad scheme to use a powerful artifact known as the Blade of Binding to open the gates to the demon world of Sheogh and drown Ashan in chaos. He is shown to worship Urgash, the dragon of chaos, in Fiona's story. It is also shown, in Aidan's story, that Aidan had unknowingly taken the Blade of Binding. After the revelation that her own father had broken her life and those of her friends, a heartbroken Nadia decides to fight Azh Rafir in his demon lord form in the story's climax. After vanquishing him, she destroys the Blade of Binding and finally derails his scheme, bringing peace to Ashan.

== Release ==
A high definition version of the game was developed for Microsoft Windows, PlayStation 3 and Xbox 360. The HD version, in addition to reconfiguring the gameplay to work on a single screen, also features several changes to help better balance gameplay and was released via PlayStation Network and Xbox Live Arcade on April 12–13, 2011. The PC version, which notably uses Steamworks rather than Uplay, was released on September 22, 2011. Ports of the HD version for iOS and Android were later released in 2013.

A remake of the game with redrawn artwork, titled Might & Magic: Clash of Heroes – Definitive Edition, developed and published by Dotemu, was released for the Nintendo Switch, PlayStation 4 and Windows on 20 July 2023.

== Reception ==
Reception

Aggregate score
Aggregator	Score				
Aggregator	DS	iOS	PC	PS3	Xbox 360
Metacritic	86/100	83/100	76/100	84/100	84/100

Review scores
Publication	Score				
Publication	DS	iOS	PC	PS3	Xbox 360
Destructoid	N/A	7/10	N/A	N/A	9/10
Eurogamer	8/10	8/10	N/A	9/10	9/10
Game Informer	7.75/10	N/A	N/A	7.75/10	7.75/10
GameSpot	8.5/10	N/A	N/A	8/10	8/10
IGN	8.9/10	8.5/10	N/A	9/10	9/10
Joystiq	N/A	N/A	N/A	N/A	4/5
MacLife	N/A	4/5	N/A	N/A	N/A
Nintendo Power	8.5/10	N/A	N/A	N/A	N/A
Official Xbox Magazine (US)	N/A	N/A	N/A	N/A	8.5/10
PC Gamer (UK)	N/A	N/A	72%	N/A	N/A
Pocket Gamer	4/5	4.5/5	N/A	N/A	N/A
PlayStation: The Official Magazine	N/A	N/A	N/A	9/10	N/A
RPGamer	4/5	N/A	N/A	N/A	4/5
RPGFan	88%	N/A	N/A	N/A	N/A
Digital Spy	N/A	4/5	N/A	N/A	N/A
National Post	N/A	7/10	N/A	N/A	N/A

The game received "generally favorable reviews" on all platforms according to the review aggregator website Metacritic.

Edge gave the DS version nine out of ten, saying, "Even if the DNA of its forebears is barely apparent, such a bold, brilliant transformation certainly involves something a little like magic." GamePro gave the same DS version four stars out of five, saying, "It's becoming increasingly rare for companies to release new and unproven titles that buck convention and focus on changing the current landscape but Clash of Heroes does so remarkably well, making for a unique and satisfying title that feels totally fresh. I recommend it to any RPG gamer looking for a unique take on the established genre; puzzle fans should take a look as well." Later, the same website gave the Xbox 360 version four stars, saying that "honestly, it's the puzzling that makes Clash of Heroes tick. Even without the online multiplayer and superior graphics, I would still recommend this game to RPG and puzzle fans, as not nearly enough people played the original. Here on high-definition consoles, it's cheap and accessible, meaning that it demands a look. If you missed out on the original, consider this a second chance. Go and take it." GameZone gave the same console version a similar score of eight out of ten, saying, "For those who prefer strategy and planning over the random elements of a game like Puzzle Quest, Clash of Heroes may be the deviously clever, deliberately paced game you've been looking for. It can be a bit rough around the edges, but it's also the smartest and most rewarding puzzle-RPG you're likely to play." TouchArcade, however, gave the iOS version three stars out of five, saying, "If you have a recent iPad or an iPad mini, it's probably worth playing on iOS, though you might want to hold out for a few bug fixes. With those in hand, this could easily be one of the best puzzle strategy games on the platform. Without them, it's simply not."

Metro gave the DS version a score of eight out of ten, calling it a "Superb mix of role-playing, puzzle and strategy action, wrapped up in a very palatable fantasy package." The website later gave the Xbox 360 and iOS versions the same score of eight out of ten, calling the former a "Superb mix of role-playing, puzzle and strategy action, with gorgeous new HD graphics and an addictive online mode"; and later saying of the latter, "Not necessarily the best version of the game, but it's definitely the cheapest – and a still superb mix of role-playing, puzzle and strategy action." Digital Spy gave the same iOS version four stars out of five, saying, "On a high note, Might and Magic: Clash of Heroes [sic] makes the significant addition of asynchronous multiplayer, which fits the game's strategic turn-based format perfectly." However, National Post gave it a score of seven out of ten, saying, "There's no question that Might and Magic: Clash of Heroes [sic], bugs and all, remains one of the best puzzle/tactical fantasy RPGs around."

IGN gave the DS version a Best of E3 2009 nomination for Best DS Strategy Game.
