= Schim =

2024 video game

- Windows and Xbox Series version cover
- Developers: Ewoud van der Werf; Nils Slijkerman
- Publisher: Extra Nice: JP: Playism
- Director: Ewoud van der Werf
- Designer: Nils Slijkerman
- Programmer: Ewoud van der Werf
- Artist: Ewoud van der Werf
- Composers: Rafael Langoni; Gabriel Marques
- Engine: Unity
- Platforms: Windows; macOS; Linux; Nintendo Switch; PlayStation 4; PlayStation 5; Xbox One; Xbox Series X/S
- Release: 18 July 2024
- Genre: Platform
- Mode: Single-player

Schim (Note: Stylized as SCHiM) is a 2024 video game developed by independent Dutch developers Ewoud van der Werf and Nils Slijkerman, and published by Slijkerman's development studio Extra Nice. Playism released the game in Japan. The game is a platformer in which players guide a "schim", a creature that lives in shadows, throughout the environment to be reunited with its host's shadow. Van der Werf developed the game inspired by childhood games involving shadows, with the game's title being a Dutch expression for a shadow. The game received mixed reviews upon release, with praise directed to the game's visual presentation and novel gameplay concept, and critiques to the repetition and lack of variety of its gameplay across its levels. Following release, Schim received awards at the Tokyo Game Show and nominations at the London Games Festival and A Maze festival.

== Gameplay ==
As a schim, players must navigate through shadows in the game's environment.

Schim is a platformer in which the player controls a boy and his titular 'schim', a frog-like creature that inhabits his shadow. The game follows the boy through life stages, from youth to study, graduation and entry into a career, then experiencing a series of hardships that lead him to become separated from the schim. Players, in the role of the schim, must travel through shadows across the city to reunite with the man. The game contains 65 levels, with most featuring a similar objective of following the trail of the man as he leaves a scene, controlling the schim by navigating across shadows cast by objects and characters in the environment.

Players control the schim by hopping around shadows. If the player lands outside a shadow, they can briefly perform an additional hop within a small window of time to return to one. Otherwise, players landing outside a shadow return to a checkpoint earlier in the level. In order to progress, players interact with objects or characters they are inside the shadow of by pressing a single button. These interactions make objects or characters cast new shadows that allow the player reach new areas. Other objects, such as a windsock or a clothesline, can launch the schim further than it can jump. Interactive elements that are required to progress are highlighted.

Completion of the game unlocks settings that introduce additional gameplay challenges. These settings include turning off secondary jumps or checkpoints, and a "risky mode" that limits the number of times the player can land outside of a shadow before reaching a game over state.

== Development and release ==
=== Development ===
Schim was created by Ewoud van der Werf, a Dutch independent developer, and Nils Slijkerman, a member of the game's co-publisher, Extra Nice. Van der Werf created the game's art and programming, and Slijkerman designing the game, levels, narrative and motion capture elements. Van der Werf stated that the game's concept was inspired by memories of playing games with shadows as a child, with the game's title being a Dutch expression for a shadow. This concept was first implemented, with the developers then brainstorming the "general lore (and) rules of the world, the schim characters, and what they mean to the game".

Schim was developed by van der Werf in the Unity engine. The minimalistic line art design of the game, which began their design as silhouettes, were created using custom shaders made by van der Werf. The visual style was influenced by the work of The Adventures of Tintin artist Hergé and Dutch illustrator Joost Swarte, as well as using similar techniques as the video games Sable and Manifold Garden. The game's environments drew from Dutch locations and landmarks, which became a "core ingredient of the game" after positive feedback from playtesters. Van der Werf, who has color blindness, designed the game's visuals with the intent to limit the palette to four colours, although expanded this to each level having a color scheme based on the "time of day, temperature or events in the story".

=== Release ===
Schim was announced during the June 2022 Day of the Devs digital showcase. In April 2024, the game's release date of 18 July was announced at Nintendo's Indie World Showcase, followed by an official demo and trailer in May. Playism published the game in Japan, featuring a new cover designed by Japanese illustrator Keiichi Arawi.

== Reception ==
Reception

Aggregate score
Aggregator	Score
Metacritic	67%

Review scores
Publication	Score
Edge	5/10
Hardcore Gamer	3.5/5
IGN	7/10
Nintendo Life	7/10
Nintendo World Report	8/10
PC Gamer (US)	57/100
Push Square	6/10
TouchArcade	4.5/5
Multiplayer.it	7/10
Vandal	6.5/10

Schim received "mixed or average" reviews from critics, according to review aggregator Metacritic. Reviewers praised the originality and uniqueness of the game's shadow platforming gameplay, with many critics finding the gameplay and controls simple and accessible. However, other reviewers felt the game was too simplistic to be challenging, or did not clearly communicate the behavior of the shadows. Some critics also considered the gameplay too repetitive across its levels. Jody Macgregor of PC Gamer considered there to be little content under the game's surface, stating the game was "not hard enough to be a challenge, but not painless enough to be relaxing". Similarly, Mikhail Madnani of Touch Arcade wrote "there really is no evolution of the mechanics over the course of the game".

The visual presentation of the game was praised, including for its use of minimalism, line art and negative space, and for its smooth physics and animations. The aesthetic of the game was considered to effectively complement the game's concept by some reviewers, with Nicole Carpenter of Polygon stating that "the game's use of color, shadow and light is essential in conveying Schim's story and emotion. Critics also commended the laid-back pacing of the levels, and the level or interaction possible with elements in each level. However, some reviewers critiqued the lack of content and variety across levels, finding the environments to be too similar.

The game's narrative received mixed assessments, with some critics finding its story to be subtle and emotionally resonant, and praising its delivery without dialogue or text. However, other critics considered the substance of the story to be minimal or tedious. Ed Thorn of Rock Paper Shotgun commended the game's early vignette of scenes seeing the character grow up, but considered the remainder of the game to not be "as emotionally charged as it implies early on". Jeni Lada of Siliconera expressed annoyance at the premise, finding the wordless story never allowed her to connect with the main character, and that it was disappointing to see that "even if my platforming was perfect, there were still more levels to come and I wouldn't reunite the two."

The game's audio soundtrack was also praised, with some critics finding it complemented the pacing and tone of the game.

=== Accolades ===
Schim received the Audience Award Grand Prix and Best Game Design Award at the 2022 Tokyo Game Show Sense of Wonder Night, an independent games award showcase, with one judge praising the "nostalgia and novelty of the game idea". The game was also nominated for the International Innovators award at the 2022 London Games Festival as part of its Official Selection, and nominated as a selection for the 2023 A Maze festival.
