= Capybara Games =

Canadian video game company

- Company type: Private
- Industry: Video games
- Founded: 2003
- Headquarters: Toronto, Ontario, Canada
- Products: Critter Crunch, Might & Magic: Clash of Heroes, Superbrothers: Sword & Sworcery EP, Super Time Force
- Number of employees: 22 (2014)
- Website: www.capybaragames.com

Capybara Games is an independent game studio based in Toronto, Ontario, Canada. The studio was founded in 2003 from a collection of Toronto IGDA members. The company is most known for developing 2011's Superbrothers: Sword & Sworcery EP and 2014's Super Time Force.

== Games developed ==
Title	Release year	Platform(s)	Publisher
S.M.A.B.U: Earth Wars	2003	Mobile	Capy Games
Super Shove IT! (also known as Super Shove Shove)	2003	Mobile	Capy Games/Starwave Mobile
Monkey On Your Back	2005	Mobile	Capy Games/Infusio
Plant Life	2005	Mobile	Capy Games
Disney/Pixar's Cars	2006	Mobile	Capy Games/Disney Interactive Studios
Warner Bros' Happy Feet	2006	Mobile	Capy Games/Warner Bros.
Pillowfight	2007	BlackBerry	Capy Games/Digital Bridges Limited ta Iplay
Chub City	2007	Mobile	Capy Games/Starwave Mobile
Pirates of the Caribbean: At World's End	2007	Mobile	Gapy Games/Disney Interactive Studios
Take Yer Meds!	2007	Mobile	Capy Games/Infospace
Critter Crunch	2007/2008/2009	Mobile, BlackBerry, iOS (iPhone/iPad), PlayStation 3, Macintosh, PC	Capy Games/Disney Interactive Studios/Player X/Magmic
Mercenaries 2: World in Flames	2008	Mobile	Capy Games/I-play/Pandemic Studios
Might & Magic: Clash of Heroes	2009/2011	DS, PlayStation 3, Xbox 360, PC, Android, iOS (iPhone/iPad)	Capy Games/Ubisoft/Tag Games
Heartbeat	Cancelled	Nintendo WiiWare	Capy Games
Superbrothers: Sword & Sworcery EP	2011	iOS (iPhone/iPad), PC, Macintosh, Linux, Android, Nintendo Switch	Superbrothers
Sound Shapes	2012	PlayStation 3, PlayStation Vita, PlayStation 4	SCEA
Super Time Force	2014	Xbox 360, Xbox One, PC, PlayStation Vita, PlayStation 4, Linux, Macintosh	Capy Games
Don't Starve: Shipwrecked	2015	PC, Macintosh, Linux, PlayStation 4, Xbox One, iOS (iPhone/iPad), Android	Klei Entertainment
OK K.O.! Let's Play Heroes	2018	Xbox One, PlayStation 4, PC, Nintendo Switch	Cartoon Network
Below	2018	Xbox One, PC, PlayStation 4	Capy Games
Grindstone	2019	iOS (iPhone/iPad), macOS, Switch, Microsoft Windows	Capy Games
Battle Vision Network	2026	Microsoft Windows	Capy Games
Find Your Words	2026	Microsoft Windows	Capy Games
