= Magdalena Górka =

Polish cinematographer (born 1977)

- Born: 29 October 1977 (age 49); Pruszków, Poland
- Education: Łódź Film School
- Occupation: Cinematographer
- Years active: 1999–present
- Organization: American Society of Cinematographers
- Website: magdalenagorka.com

Magdalena Górka (Polish pronunciation: [maɡ.daˈlɛ.na ˈɡur.ka]; born 29 October 1977) is a Polish cinematographer best known for her work on films such as Paranormal Activity 3 (2011), Viral (2016), An Ordinary Man (2017), and Irreplaceable You (2018). She has also worked on several music videos with artists such as Elton John and Katy Perry.

== Biography ==
In 2000, she graduated from the Cinematography Department of the National Film School in Łódź. She became a member of the Polish Society of Cinematographers (PSC), the American Society of Cinematographers (ASC), and in 2024, a member of the Academy of Motion Picture Arts and Sciences (AMPAS).

In 2010, she sued Casey Affleck for $2.25 million with multiple complaints including intentional infliction of emotional distress and breach of oral contract. Magdalena Górka alleged that she had been subjected to “routine instances” of sexual harassment by crew members including Antony Langdon, “within the presence and with the active encouragement of Affleck.” Affleck denied the allegations and threatened countersuits, but eventually agreed to mediation and settled both cases out of court.

== Filmography ==
- Park tysiąca westchnień (2004)
- Glina (TV series) (2007–2008), episodes 13–25
- I'm Still Here (2010)
- Paranormal Activity 3 (2011)
- The Levenger Tapes (2011)
- Jack Strong (2014)
- Viral (2016)
- An Ordinary Man (2017)
- You Get Me (2017)
- Irreplaceable You (2018)
- Doom Patrol (2019)
- Kurier (film) (2019)
- Die in a Gunfight (2021)
- Star Trek: Strange New Worlds (2022)
- Echo (2024)
- The Brink of War (2026)
- Animal Friends (2027)
- Green Bank (TBA)
