= Critter Crunch =

2007 video game

- Developer: Capybara Games
- Publishers: Disney Interactive Studios; Starwave (Note: The PlayStation 3 version was self-published by Capybara Games.)
- Engine: PhyreEngine
- Platforms: BREW, J2ME, iOS, PlayStation 3, Windows, Mac OS X
- Release: BREW, J2ME; 2007 iOS; July 10, 2008; PlayStation 3: NA: October 8, 2009; EU: November 19, 2009; Microsoft Windows & Mac: WW: September 11, 2012
- Genre: Puzzle
- Modes: Single-player, multiplayer

Critter Crunch is a puzzle game in the vein of Magical Drop by Capybara Games for mobile phone platforms BREW and J2ME in 2007. It was later ported to iOS, PlayStation 3 on the PlayStation Network, Windows, and Mac OS X.

In Critter Crunch, players assume the role of Biggs, a friendly, furry forest dweller with an unending hunger for tasty critters. Using his long tongue, Biggs must set the food chain in motion by launching smaller critters into the waiting mouths of larger ones, clearing the screen and filling his belly.

== Reception ==
The game was given positive reviews. It has an average of 78% at Game Rankings and a 87/100 at Metacritic. It won Best Game of 2007 at the Independent Games Festival Mobile.

Review Scores
1UP: 9.5/10
IGN: 8.6/10
