= Amanda White =

Canadian producer (born 1971)

Amanda White (born January 15, 1971, in Kitchener, Ontario) is a Canadian producer. She is a partner in iam8bit, a production company, marketing boutique and artist collective, along with Jon M. Gibson.

== Career ==
White began her film career in 1996 working under producer Chris Moore on the Academy Award-winning film Good Will Hunting. After relocating to Los Angeles from Toronto in 1997, she produced several short films for the Sundance Channel. White's documentary producing career began in 2000 with Long Gone, an award-winner at film festivals worldwide. In 2006, she produced Chris Moore's directorial debut, Kill Theory, and in 2010 she produced I'm Still Here, the Joaquin Phoenix documentary/mockumentary.

White joined iam8bit in late 2009, and is currently a partner and producer.

== 2010 lawsuit ==
In 2010, White sued actor Casey Affleck for sexual harassment while shooting the Joaquin Phoenix mockumentary I'm Still Here. White and another colleague, Magdalena Górka, filed a civil suit for sexual harassment, among other claims. Affleck denied the allegations and threatened countersuits, but eventually agreed to mediation and settled both cases out of court.

== Filmography ==
- I'm Still Here (2010) (producer)
- The People Speak (2009) (co-producer)
- Kill Theory (2009) (producer)
- Long Gone (2003) (executive producer)
- Joyride (2001) (assistant to producer)
- Reindeer Games (2000) (assistant to producer)
- Untitled Sundance Shorts (1999) (producer)
- In Too Deep (1999) (assistant production coordinator)
- Best Laid Plans (1999) (assistant to producer)
- Woo (1998) (production assistant)
- Good Will Hunting (1997) (assistant: Ms. Armstrong)

== Commercials/Virals ==
- When Did Social Gaming Get So Lame? (2011) producer. Boardroom satire featuring venture capitalist icon David Hornik. Produced by [iam8bit].
- Save the Unicorn Parade (2011) producer. PSA satire starring Rachael Leigh Cook. Produced by iam8bit
- Mega Man Universe Teaser Trailer (2010) producer. A live-action/stop-motion hybrid teaser trailer for Mega Man Universe. Produced by iam8bit, in conjunction with Buddy System Studios, for Capcom Entertainment
- 'Lost' Mega Man 10 Commercial (2010) producer. A "faux" commercial for Mega Man 10, posed as an archival discovery from the 1980s. Produced by iam8bit for Capcom Entertainment.

== Books ==
- SUPER iam8bit: More Art Inspired by Classic Videogames of the 80s (2011) ISBN 978-1-60887-000-4, a follow-up collection of the iam8bit exhibition's best pieces from the years 2006–2010. Foreword by Kevin Pereira. Co-authored with Jon M. Gibson, Taylor Harrington and Nick Ahrens.
