= I'm Still Here (2010 film) =

2010 film by Casey Affleck

- Theatrical release poster
- Directed by: Casey Affleck
- Written by: Casey Affleck; Joaquin Phoenix
- Produced by: Casey Affleck; Joaquin Phoenix; Amanda White
- Starring: Joaquin Phoenix; Casey Affleck
- Cinematography: Casey Affleck; Magdalena Górka
- Edited by: Casey Affleck; Dody Dorn
- Music by: Marty Fogg
- Production companies: They Are Going to Kill Us Productions; Flemmy Productions
- Distributed by: Magnolia Pictures
- Release dates: September 6, 2010 (Venice Film Festival); September 10, 2010 (United States)
- Running time: 106 minutes
- Country: United States
- Language: English
- Box office: $626,000

I'm Still Here is a 2010 American mockumentary musical parody film directed by Casey Affleck, and written by Affleck and Joaquin Phoenix. The film follows the real life of Phoenix from the announcement of his retirement from acting through his transition into a career as a hip hop artist. Throughout the filming period, Phoenix remained in character for public appearances, giving some the impression that he was genuinely pursuing a new career, though many identified it as artificial.

== Premise ==
In 2008, while rehearsing for a charity event, actor Joaquin Phoenix, with Casey Affleck's camera filming, tells people he is quitting acting to pursue a career in rap music. Over the next year, Phoenix writes, rehearses, and performs to an audience. He approaches Sean Combs in hopes he will produce the record. We see Phoenix in his home: he parties, smokes, engages in depravity with his two-man entourage, debates philosophy with Affleck, and rants about celebrity.

== Cast ==
- Joaquin Phoenix as himself
- Sean "P. Diddy" Combs as himself
- Casey Affleck as himself
- Antony Langdon as himself
- Mos Def as himself
- Ben Stiller as himself
- Edward James Olmos as himself
- Jamie Foxx as himself
- Billy Crystal as himself
- Jack Nicholson as himself
- Danny DeVito as himself
- Bruce Willis as himself
- Robin Wright as herself
- Hugh Grant as himself
- Natalie Portman as herself
- Sean Penn as himself
- Tim Affleck as himself
- Matthew Maher as himself

== Release ==
The film premiered at the 67th Venice International Film Festival on September 6, 2010. It had a limited release in the United States on September 10, 2010 before being expanded to a wide release a week later on September 17. Although widely suspected to be a "mockumentary", the fact that the events of the film had been deliberately staged was not disclosed until after the film had been released.

== Production ==
According to Phoenix, the film arose from his amazement that people believed reality television shows' claims of being unscripted. By claiming to retire from acting, he and his then friend/brother-in-law Casey Affleck planned to make a film that "explored celebrity, and explored the relationship between the media and the consumers and the celebrities themselves" through their film.

After surprising Hollywood by abruptly announcing his retirement in late 2008, allegedly in order to focus on his music, Phoenix and Affleck began filming the documentary, which followed Phoenix as he began a career making hip-hop music while allegedly managed by rap icon Sean "Diddy" Combs.

== Reception ==
In May 2010, the film was shown to potential buyers. The Los Angeles Times reported that the film featured "more male frontal nudity than you'd find in some gay porn films and a stomach-turning sequence in which someone feuding with Phoenix defecates on the actor while he's asleep". Also, the film is said to depict Phoenix "snorting cocaine, ordering call girls, having oral sex with a publicist, treating his assistants abusively and rapping badly." Reportedly, after seeing it, film buyers were uncertain whether it was a serious documentary or a mockumentary.

As of August 2025, the film holds a 53% approval rating on the review aggregator website Rotten Tomatoes based on 129 reviews. The site's critics consensus reads, "As unkempt and inscrutable as Joaquin Phoenix himself, I'm Still Here raises some interesting questions about its subject, as well as the nature of celebrity, but it fails to answer many of them convincingly." On Metacritic, the film has a weighted average score of 48 out of 100 based on 33 critics, indicating "mixed or average" reviews. Critics were divided on whether to interpret the film as documentary or performance art. Box Office Mojo reported a worldwide gross of $626,000 as of January 2021.

== Title ==
An article in the Relevant Magazine suggested that the title is a reference to Todd Haynes' I'm Not There.

== On-set sexual harassment allegations ==
In 2010, two crew members from the film filed civil lawsuits against its director, Casey Affleck. Amanda White, one of the film's producers, sued Affleck for $2 million with multiple complaints including sexual harassment and breach of oral contract. She detailed numerous "uninvited and unwelcome sexual advances" in the workplace. White alleged that Affleck refused to honor the terms of the production agreement, including her fee, in retaliation.

The cinematographer, Magdalena Górka, sued Affleck for $2.25 million with multiple complaints including intentional infliction of emotional distress and breach of oral contract. Gorka alleged that she had been subjected to "routine instances" of sexual harassment by crew members including Antony Langdon, "within the presence and with the active encouragement of Affleck."

In a 2018 interview with the Associated Press, Affleck discussed the lawsuits and allegations in light of the Me Too movement. He characterized his behavior at the time of the lawsuits as defensive and said he has since worked to understand his own culpability. He acknowledged that the set of I'm Still Here was "an unprofessional environment" and that "I contributed to that unprofessional environment and I tolerated that kind of behavior from other people and I wish that I hadn't. And I regret a lot of that . . . I behaved in a way and allowed others to behave in a way that was really unprofessional. And I'm sorry."
