= List of women in the video game industry =

This is a list of notable women in the video game industry.

== A ==
- Reine Abbas - Lebanese video game designer
- Mabel Addis - Wrote the mainframe game The Sumerian Game (1964), becoming the first female video game designer.
- Tina Amini - IGN editor-in-chief.
- Anna Anthropy - American video game designer who has worked on multiple indie games such as Mighty Jill Off and is the game designer in residence at the DePaul University College of Computing and Digital Media.

== B ==
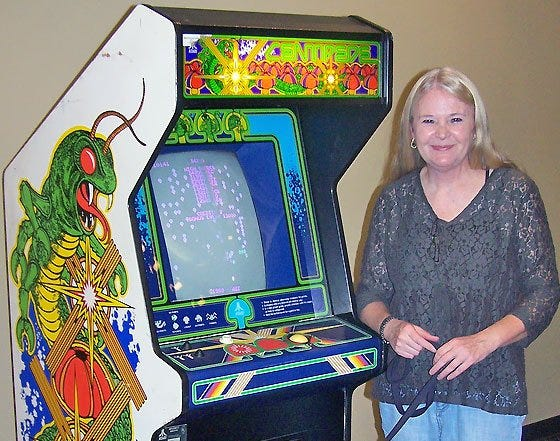
Dona Bailey

- Dona Bailey - American game programmer who, along with Ed Logg in 1981, created the arcade video game Centipede.
- Laura Bailey - American voice actress.
- Ellen Beeman - American fantasy and science fiction author, cofounder the industry group Women in Games International, and computer game designer/producer since the 1990s. Since 2014, she has been a faculty member at DigiPen Institute of Technology.
- Debbie Bestwick - British entrepreneur, founder of Team17.
- Amy Briggs - American video game implementor known for creating Plundered Hearts, an interactive fiction computer game published by Infocom in 1987.
- Danielle Bunten Berry - American game designer and programmer, known for the 1983 game M.U.L.E. (one of the first influential multiplayer games), and 1984's The Seven Cities of Gold. She was the recipient of a Lifetime Achievement Award from the Computer Game Developers Association.
- Connie Booth - American business executive as vice-president of Product Development at Sony Interactive Entertainment and advocate of many of SIE's first-party franchises since Crash Bandicoot.
- Mattie Brice - American video game designer, critic, and industry activist.
- Ashly Burch - American voice actress.

== C ==
- Vicky Carne - Founder of Mosaic Publishing. She previously worked for Haymarket and Sinclar Brown.
- Jenna Chalmers - Designer known for working with Will Wight. Recipient of WIG Achievement in Game Design. Currently, Lead Designer at Gallium Studios.
- Brie Code - Former Ubisoft AI programming lead working on titles such as Child of Light, founder of TRU LUV, co-creator of #SelfCare, an Apple Best Of 2018.

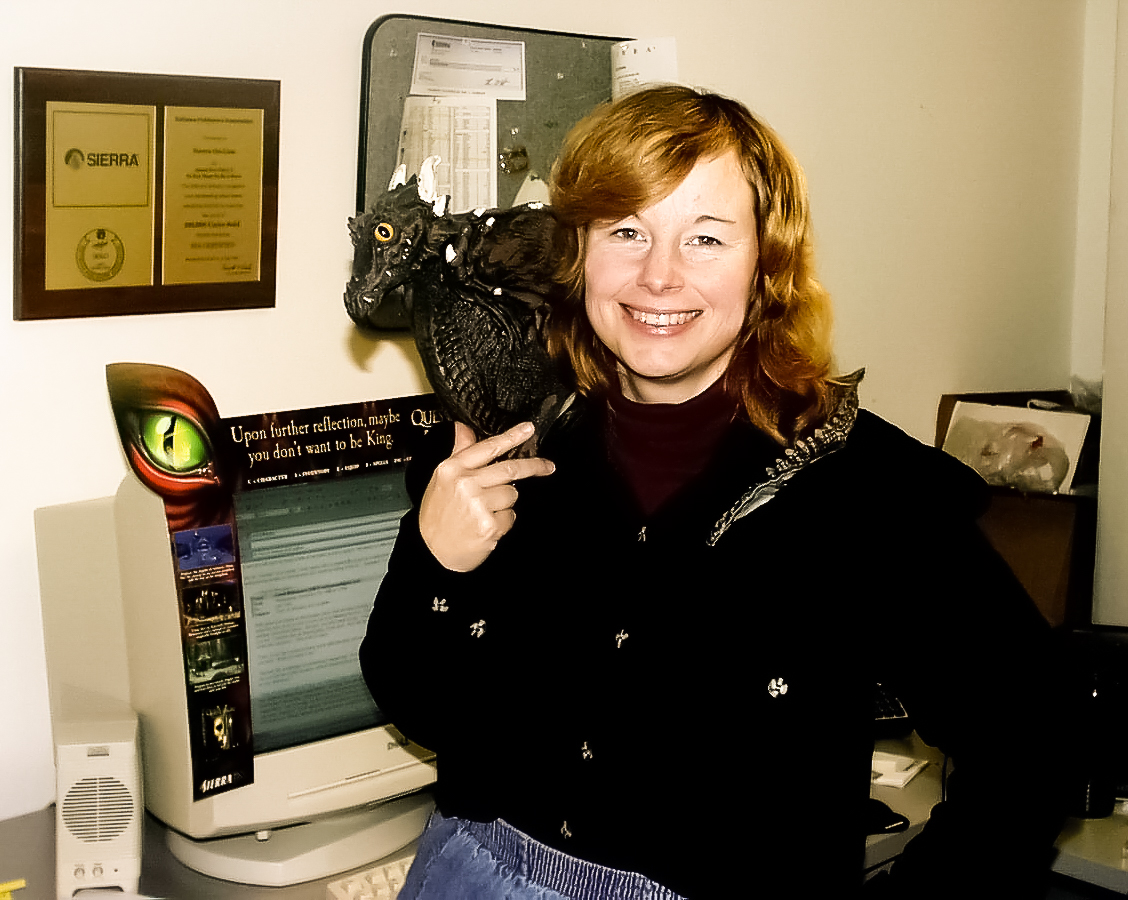
Lori Ann Cole

- Lori Cole - American game designer and writer. She and her husband Corey Cole are best known for the Quest for Glory adventure/roleplaying game series from Sierra Online. Other games she's worked on include Mixed-Up Fairy Tales (1991), Shannara (1995), the School for Heroes web game, and the Kickstarter-funded Hero-U: Rogue to Redemption (2018).
- Christina "Phazero" Curlee - Black game designer and researcher, featured at IndieCade, SAAM, and Eyeo festival Author of Meaningful Level Design. Currently a game designer at Insomniac Games.

== D ==
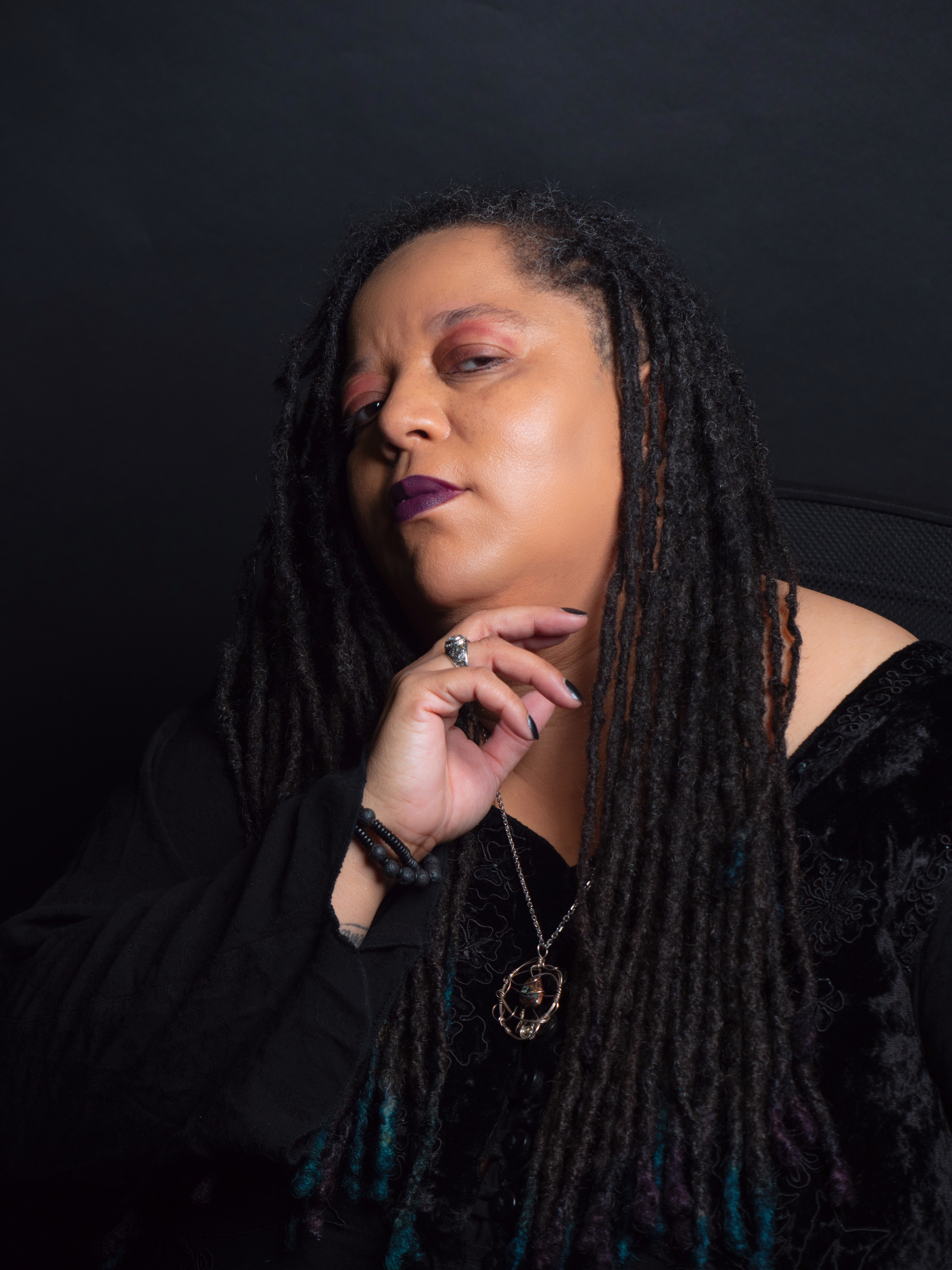
Tanya DePass

- Amber Dalton - Professional gamer.
- Tanya DePass - Founder of I Need Diverse Games.
- Elonka Dunin - American video game developer and cryptologist

== E ==
- Aubrey Edwards - American video game developer, lead producer of the Wii U launch title Scribblenauts Unlimited

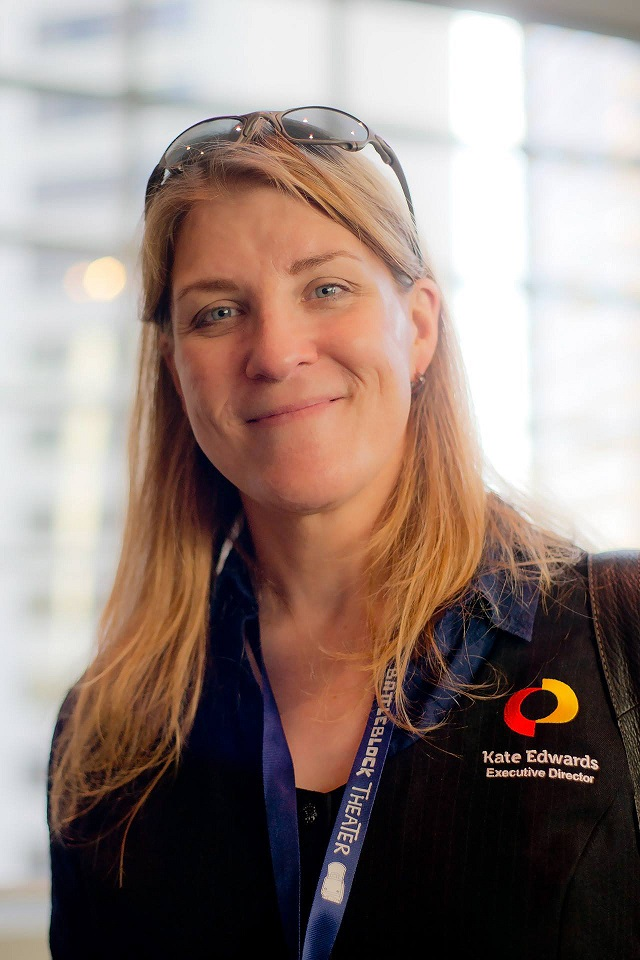
Kate Edwards

- Kate Edwards - Creator of geography game content and ex-executive director of the International Game Developers Association (IGDA).
- Sarah Elmaleh - American voice actor and cofounder of the games conference gamedev.world.
- Keiko Erikawa - Japanese video game designer and co-founder of Koei. She formed Ruby Party team by only women and then the team developed and released Angelique, the first Otome game, in 1994.

== F ==
- Mary Flanagan- Researcher.
- Rebecca Ford - Canadian game developer and voice actress, serving as director for Digital Extremes' Warframe and colloquially known as "Space Mom".
- Marie Foulston - Independent video games curator, cofounder of UK indie game collective The Wild Rumpus, and curator of video games at the Victoria and Albert Museum from 2015 to 2019.
- Megan Fox - Founder of Glass Bottom Games.
- Nina Freeman - American video game designer known for her games with themes of sexuality and self-reflection.

Tracy Fullerton

- Tracy Fullerton - American game designer, educator and writer. Fullerton's work has received numerous industry honors.

== G ==
- Emily Greer - Cofounder and CEO of Kongregate.

== H ==
- Jennifer Hale - Voice actress best known for her work in video game franchises including Baldur's Gate, Mass Effect, Metroid Prime, Metal Gear Solid, Soulcalibur, Spider-Man, BioShock Infinite, Quest for Glory: Shadows of Darkness, and Star Wars: Knights of the Old Republic. In 2013, she was recognized by Guinness World Records for "the most prolific videogame voice actor (female)".
- Rebecca Heineman - American video game designer and programmer known for her work on The Bard's Tale, The Bard's Tale III: Thief of Fate and Myth III: The Wolf Age. Heineman is also considered the first national video game champion.
- Stephanie Harvey - Canadian video game developer and retired professional gamer

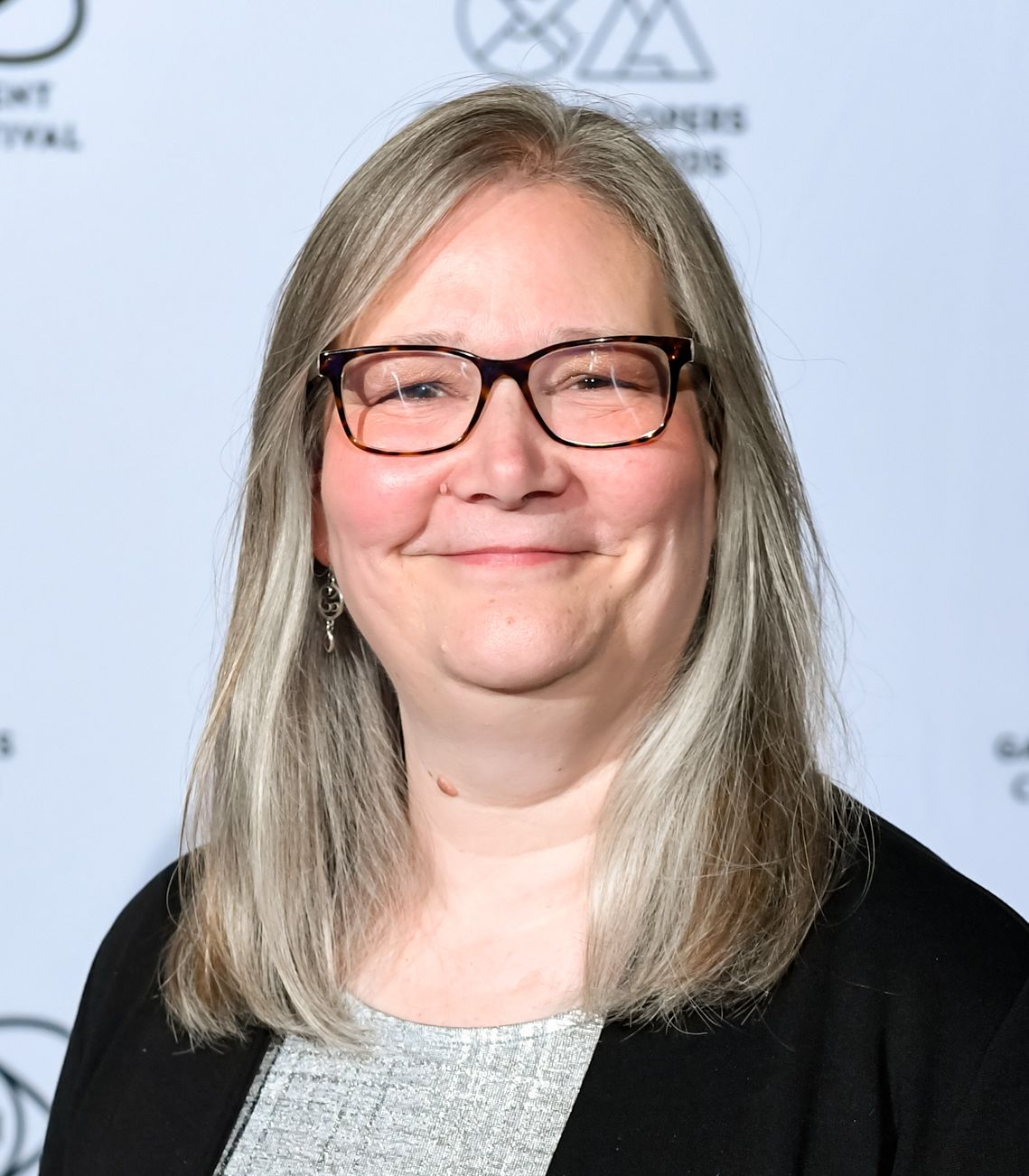
Amy Hennig

- Amy Hennig - American video game director and script writer. Her writing creates include the Legacy of Kain series for Crystal Dynamics, and Jak and Daxter and Uncharted series for Naughty Dog.
- Jennifer Hepler - Video game script writer best known for her work on BioWare's Dragon Age series.
- Miki Higashino - Japanese video game composer known for the Suikoden series.
- Keisha Howard - Founder of Sugar Gamers.
- Robin Hunicke - Producer of Journey and cofounder of Funomena.

== I ==
- Marija Ilić - Co-founder of Two Desperados - a Serbian game developer and President of the Board at Serbian Games Association. Featured as one of the "100 Game Changers" selected by gamesindusty.biz.
- Shanon M. Ingles - American writer, designer and founder of 'Martian Brothel' - the industry's first narrative and writing outsourcing studio. Best known for her work on Telltale's Batman series, Marvel's Midnight Suns, Read Only Memories: Neurodiver, the upcoming game Judas, and the Emmy-winning interactive series Silent Hill: Ascension.
- Sigurlína Ingvarsdóttir - Icelandic video game developer, chair of Icelandic game developer Solid Clouds
- Emiko Iwasaki - Artist and general director best known for her work on the Guilty Gear series, and Girls2Pioneers ambassador.

== J ==
- Jane Jensen - Video game designer most known of the popular and critically acclaimed Gabriel Knight series of adventure games.

== K ==
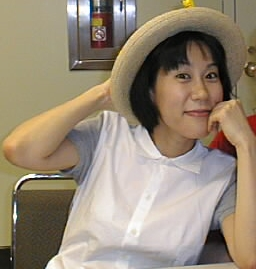
Yoko Kanno

- Lisy Kane - Australian video game producer
- Yoko Kanno - Japanese composer, arranger and musician.
- Junko Kawano - Japanese game designer, director, illustrator and writer best known as the co-creator of the Suikoden series and director of Shadow of Memories.

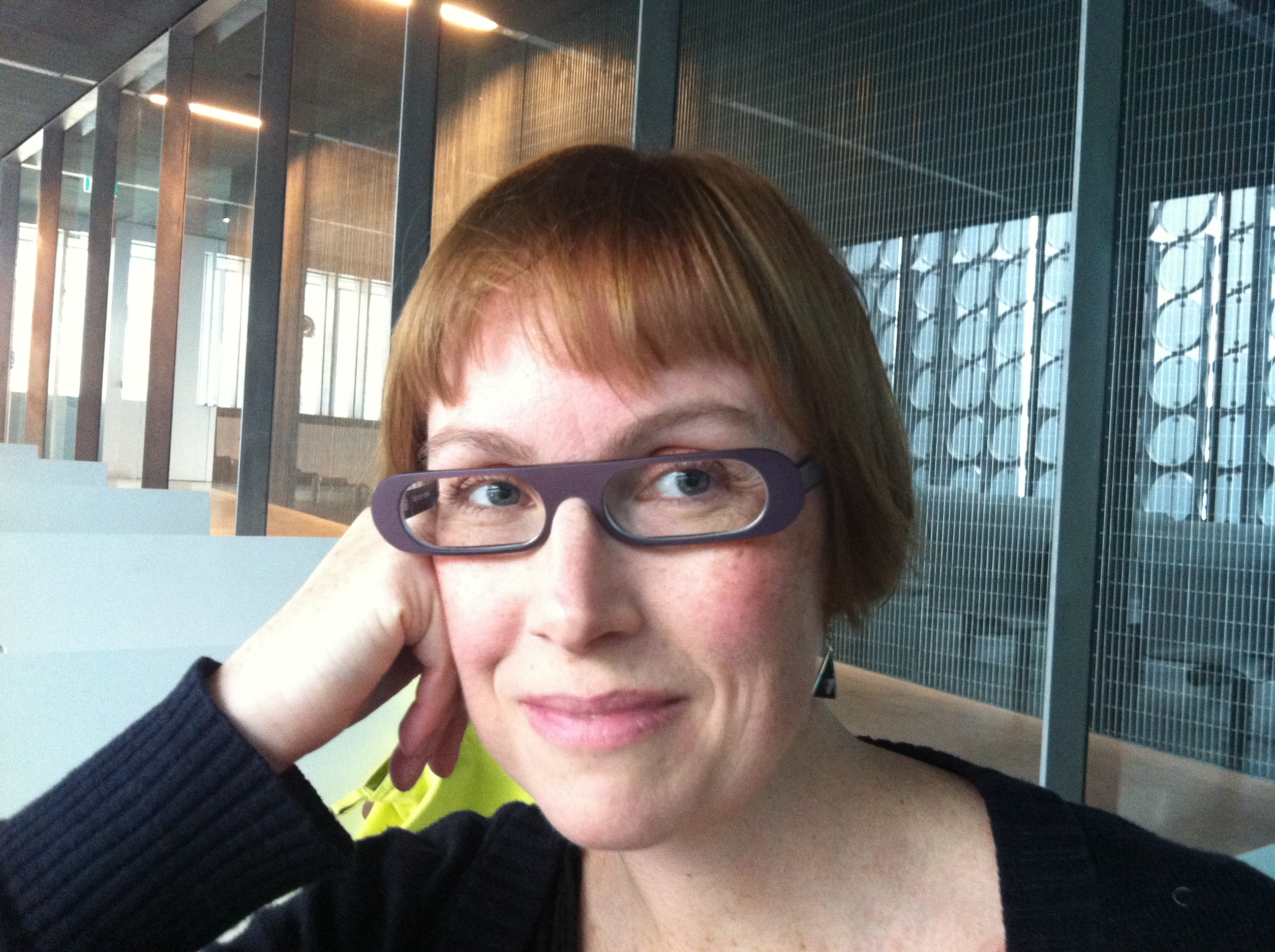
Heather Kelley

- Heather Kelley - Media artist, video game designer, curator, and educator. Best known for creating sexual pleasure software for women, experimental games, and sensory and somatic interaction in games. Co-curated the exhibition Joue le Jeu, and was a co-founder of experimental video game collective Kokoromi.
- Rieko Kodama - Artist, director, and producer known for her work on the Phantasy Star series and other Sega titles including Skies of Arcadia and the 7th Dragon series.
- Ayami Kojima - Artist, known for her work on the Castlevania and Bloodstained series.
- Mie Kumagai - Producer at Sega, and former president of Sega AM3. Lead development of the Virtua Tennis series.
- Aya Kyogoku - Manager at Nintendo EPD with leading roles in Animal Crossing series production since 2008.

== L ==
- Elizabeth LaPensée - American professor and game designer known for her work on Thunderbird Strike and other Indigenous-focused games and media
- Nicole Lazzaro - Founder of XEOPlay and XEODesign.
- Holly Liu - Lead designer of Kingdoms of Camelot and founder of Kabam.
- Christine Love - Canadian video game developer.

== M ==
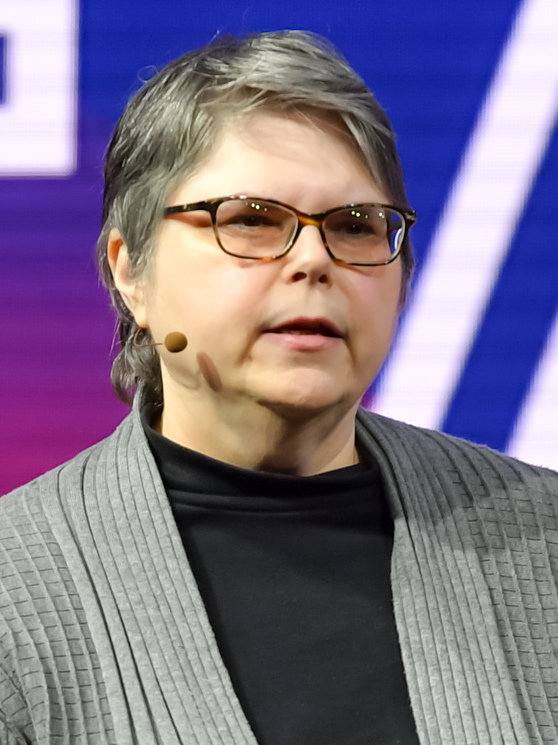
Video game designer and video game producer Laralyn McWilliams in 2019

- Sher Machado — Brazilian esports event organizer and streamer.
- Van Mai (nee Tran) — Developer of Wabbit (1982), the first console video game to feature a female protagonist.
- Jessica Mak — Game developer and musician, developed the games Everyday Shooter and Sound Shapes.
- Cathryn Mataga — Designer and programmer of Atari 8-bit games for Synapse Software and worked on the original Neverwinter Nights MMO.
- Manami Matsumae — Japanese video game composer.
- Laralyn McWilliams — American video game developer and producer.
- Carla Meninsky — Game designer and programmer for the Atari 2600.
- Laura Miele — President of Electronic Arts (EA).

== N ==
- Ikumi Nakamura - Japanese artist and director, formerly of Clover Studio, PlatinumGames, and Tango Gameworks, with credits including Ōkami, Bayonetta, and The Evil Within.
- Jane Ng - 3D environment artist, formerly of Campo Santo, who has worked on Firewatch, The Cave, and Brütal Legend, among other games.
- Laura Nikolich — Designer and programmer of Spider-Man for the Atari 2600
- Nika Nour - Executive director of IGDA.

== P ==
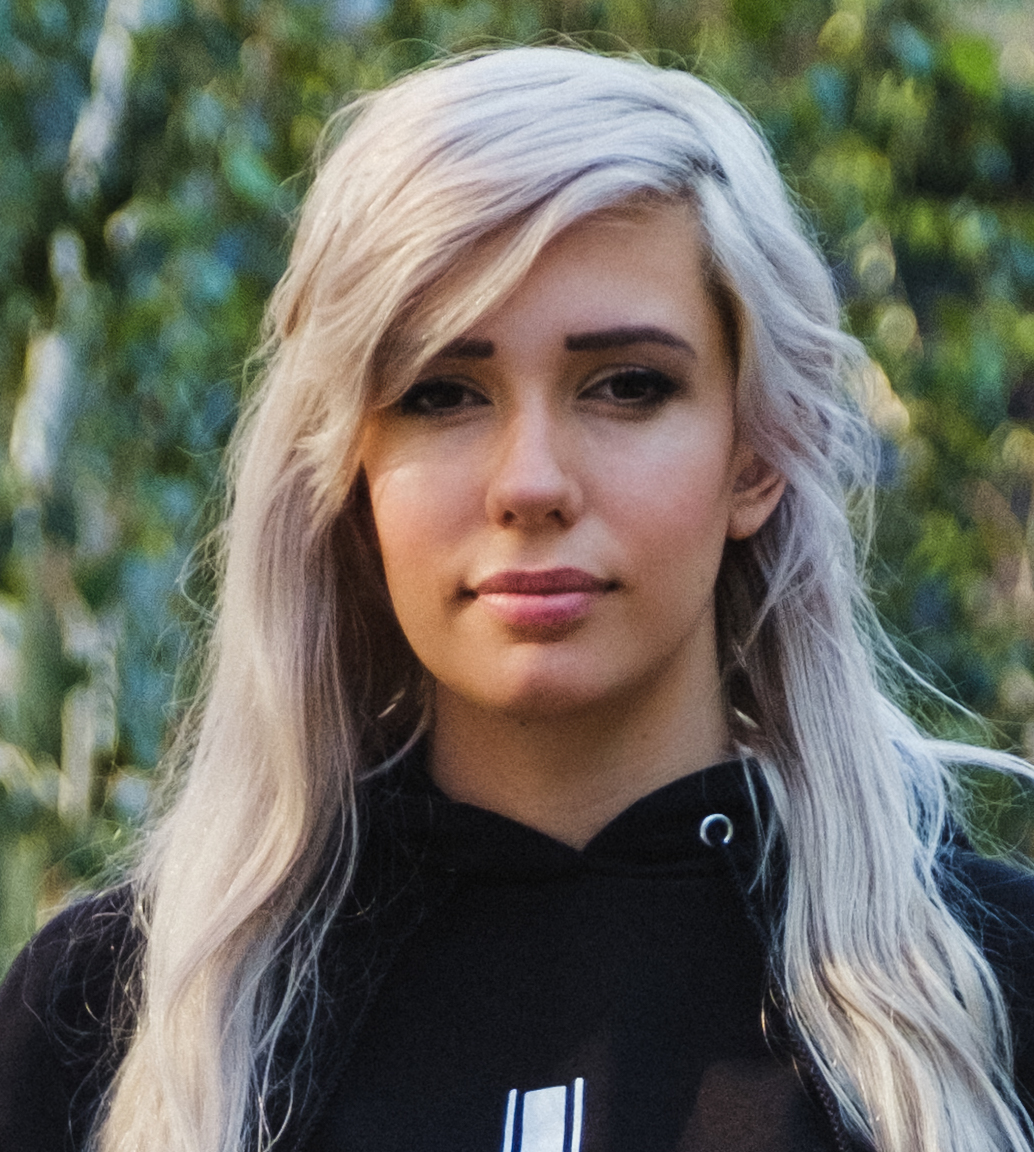
Alanah Pearce

- Alanah Pearce - Australian video game writer, working for American game developer Santa Monica Studio
- Momo Pixel - American video game designer and advertiser, created viral web-game Hair Nah

== Q ==
- Zoë Quinn - American video game developer, programmer, and writer

== R ==
- Jade Raymond - Canadian video game executive, founder of Electronic Arts' Motive Studios, head of Visceral Games, and former managing director of Ubisoft Toronto.

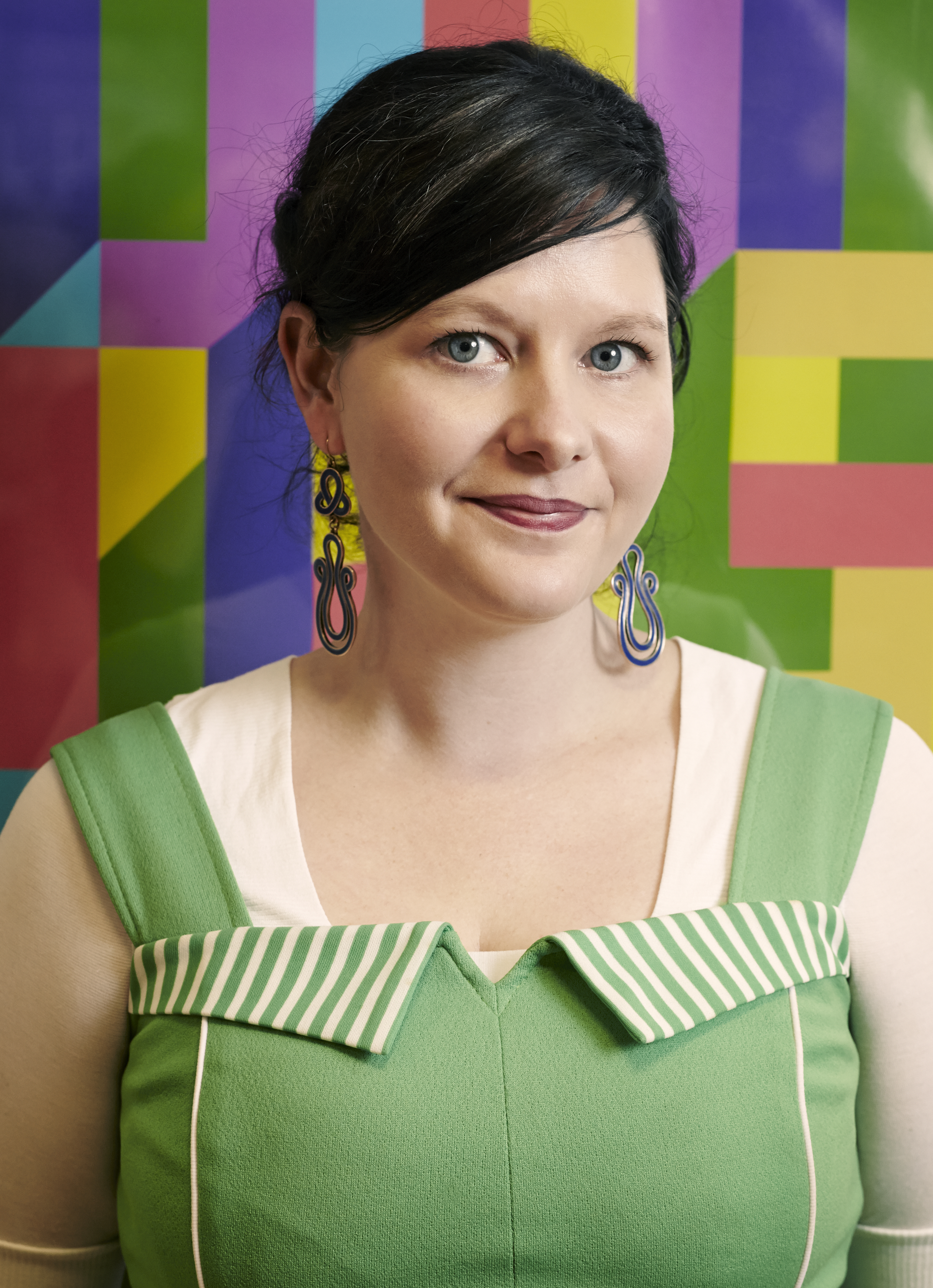
Siobhan Reddy

- Siobhan Reddy - Studio director of Media Molecule, a video game development studio based in the United Kingdom, most famous for their debut title LittleBigPlanet. She was named a BAFTA Fellowship in 2021.
- Veronica Ripley - Founder of Transmission Gaming.
- Brenda Romero - American game designer and developer notably of the Wizardry series. She has won several awards in her long career.
- Bonnie Ross - American video game developer and head of 343 Industries, the studio that manages the Halo video game franchise.
- Ronda Rousey - American athlete who has appeared in a multitude of WWE and UFC games, as well as voicing a character in Mortal Kombat 11
- Jehanne Rousseau - French video game creative director, co-founder and former CEO of Spiders.

== S ==
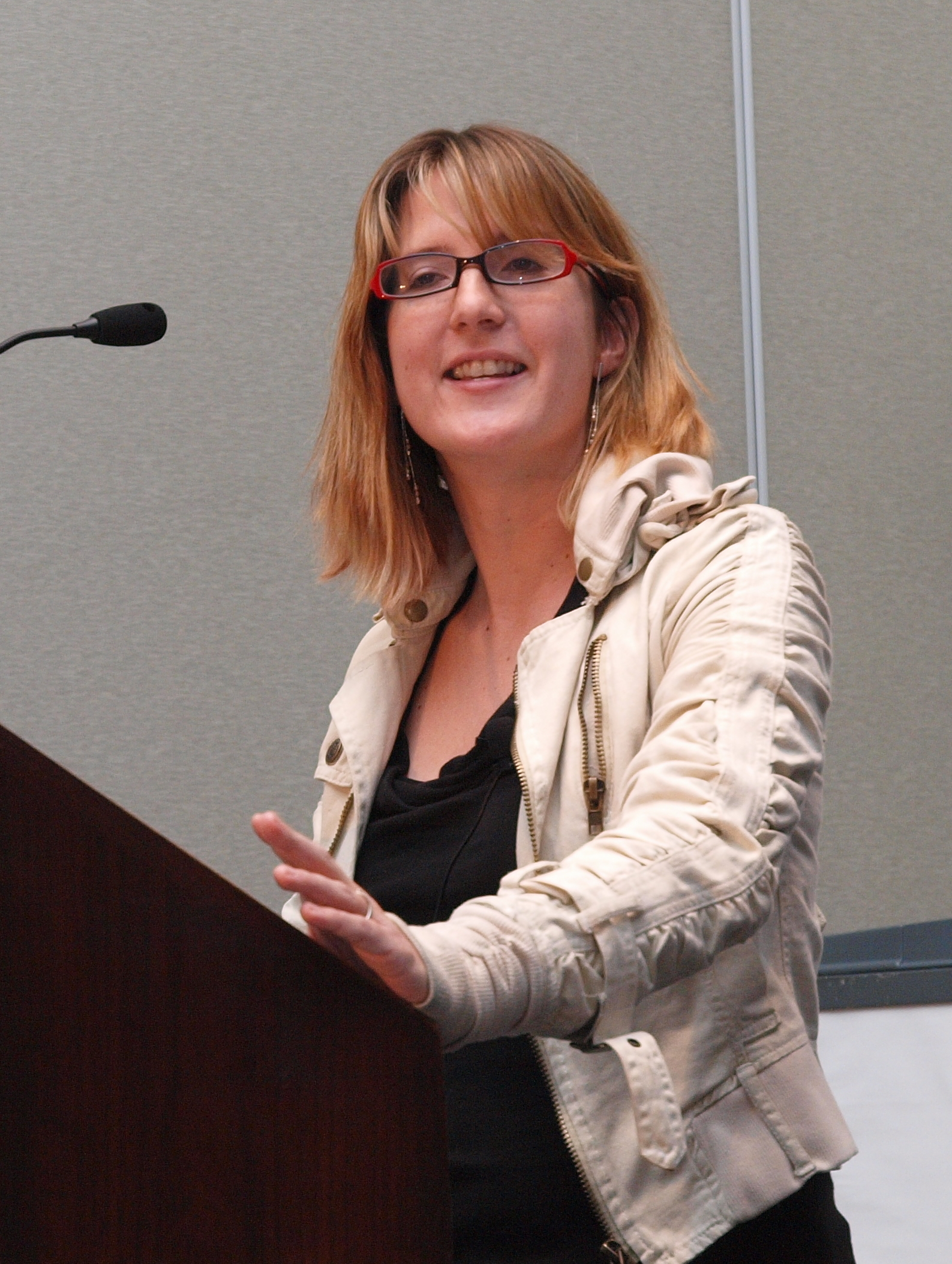
Kellee Santiago

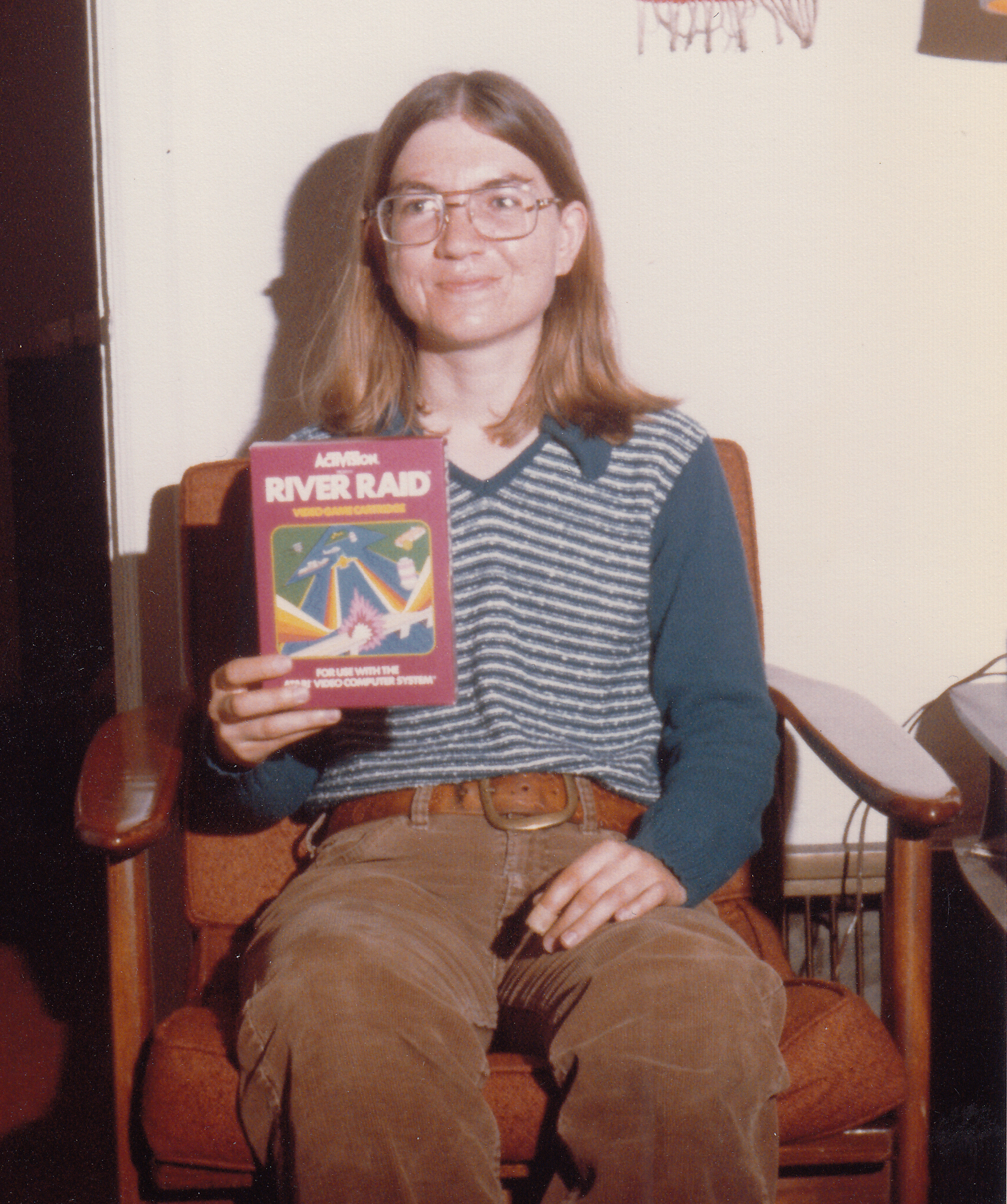
Video game designer and programmer Carol Shaw in 1982

- Kellee Santiago - Video game designer and producer. While studying at the USC Interactive Media Division at the University of Southern California, Santiago produced the game Cloud which was developed by Jenova Chen and a team of students. After graduating, Santiago and Chen founded Thatgamecompany, and Santiago took on the role of president. Santiago left Thatgamecompany in 2012. She is a backer for the Indie Fund, a TED fellow, and the head of developer relations for OUYA.
- Anita Sarkeesian - Founder of Feminist Frequency and Tropes vs. Women in Video Games.
- Cher Scarlett - American software engineer who worked at Blizzard Entertainment and known for her role in California Department of Fair Employment and Housing v. Activision Blizzard.
- Emilia Schatz - American game designer best known for her work at Naughty Dog
- Kim "Geguri" Se-yeon - South Korean esport professional and first female player signed into the Overwatch League.
- Suzanne Seggerman - Co-founder of Games for Change.
- Stephanie Shaver - American fantasy writer and video game developer
- Carol Shaw - First woman who was a full-time video game designer. She began as an Atari employee, designing and programming 3-D Tic-Tac-Toe (1979) for the Atari 2600. Shaw later joined Activision where she designed Happy Trails for the Intellivision and River Raid for the Atari 8-bit computers and Atari 5200 for which she is most widely known. Additionally, she designed an unreleased Polo game in 1978 and worked on the game Super Breakout.
- Kazuko Shibuya - Japanese video game artist known for her work with Square and Square Enix.
- Yoko Shimomura - Japanese video game composer and pianist who has composed or contributed to nearly one hundred video game soundtracks.
- Tanya X. Short - American video game designer and founder of Kitfox Games, where she has worked on games such as Shattered Planet (2014) and Moon Hunters (2016). She co-founded Pixelles, an organisation that aims to address gender diversity in video game development.
- Joelle Silverio - American video game designer, software engineer, animator, and visual effects artist. She is noted as the first Black female game designer to lead design of a AAA title, for her work on Killing Floor 2 at Tripwire Interactive. Silverio began her career at Hi-Rez Studios on Global Agenda, Tribes: Ascend, and SMITE, then designed player and systems content for EVE Online and World of Darkness at CCP Games. Silverio drove design on Killing Floor 2, co-founded the visual effects company Impulse Studios, was Gameplay/Combat Designer on Battlefield Portal at Electronic Arts, and served as Principal Gameplay Designer at TEAM KAIJU on an unannounced multiplayer FPS. She is currently a Principal Combat Designer at People Can Fly.

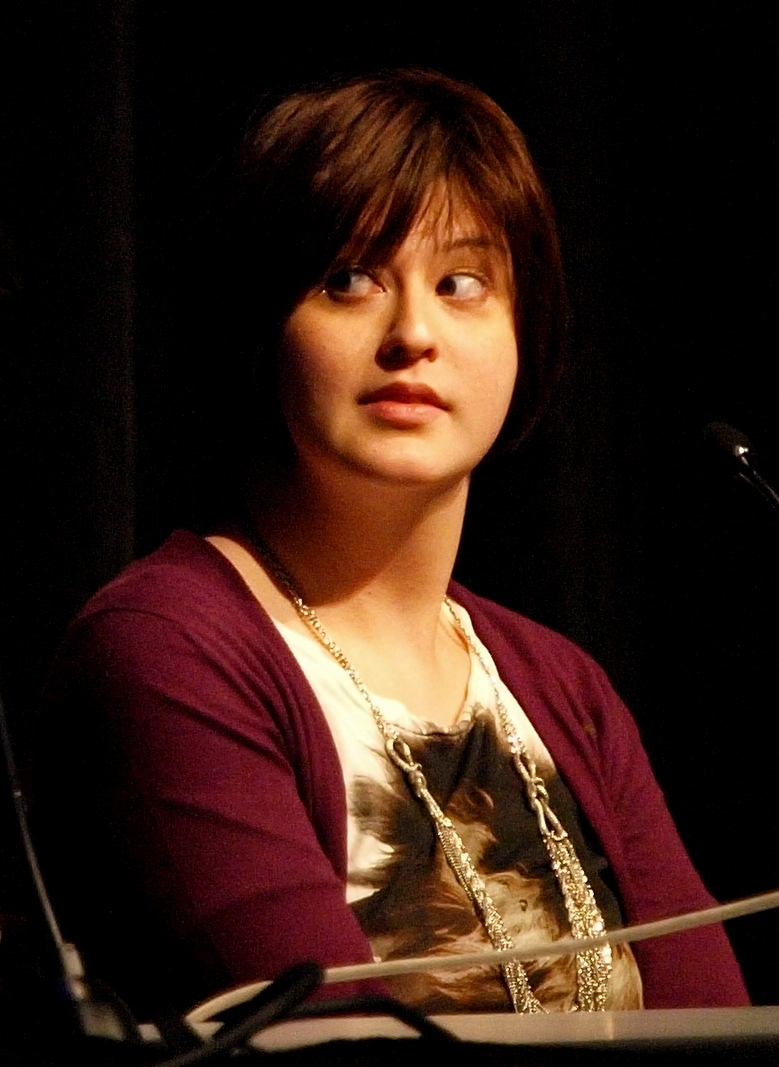
Kim Swift

- Kim Swift - American video game designer best known for her work at Valve with games such as Portal and Left 4 Dead. Swift was featured by Fortune as one of "30 Under 30" influential figures in the video game industry. She was described in Mental Floss as one of the most recognized women in the industry and by WIRED as "an artist that will push the medium forward".

== T ==
- Risa Tabata - Assistant producer, designer, and director of various Nintendo video games, such as Paper Mario: Color Splash and Donkey Kong Country: Tropical Freeze.
- Kumi Tanioka - video game composer.
- Gail Tilden - Former marketing director for Nintendo of America, who helped with the marketing of the Nintendo Entertainment System in the United States and the creation of Nintendo Power.
- Maddy Thorson - Canadian video game developer, known as one of the lead creators for the video games TowerFall and Celeste
- Pauliina Tornqvist - Finnish video game producer known for her work at Activision, Ubisoft and other publishers, on gaming franchises such as Call of Duty, Watchdogs, Trials, Angry Birds, and Travian. Tornqvist started her career by founding her own mobile game studio only at the age of 20, before continuing to work across Europe and US on multiple AAA productions - while advocating in podcasts, industry panels, and schools for diversity and equity in the video game industry.
- Muriel Tramis - Director of adventure games at Coktel Vision and recipient of France's Legion of Honour.

== V ==
- Annie VanderMeer - American video game designer specializing in role-playing video games, best known for her narrative work on 2021's Unpacking and her design work on the 2012's Guild Wars 2.

== W ==
- Joyce Weisbecker - First woman to design commercial video games, creating several games for the RCA Studio II console in 1976.
- Anne Westfall - American video game programmer, software developer, and co-founder of Free Fall Associates, a video game company best known for Archon: The Light and the Dark (1983), a game written for the Atari 8-bit computers and one of the earliest titles published by Electronic Arts.
- Roberta Williams - American video game designer and writer and a co-founder of Sierra On-Line (later known as Sierra Entertainment). She is known for her pioneering work in the field of graphic adventure games, with titles such as Mystery House, the King's Quest series, and Phantasmagoria, and is viewed as one of the most influential PC game designers of the eighties and nineties. She has been credited with creating the graphic adventure genre.
- Kiki Wolfkill - American video game developer, served as executive producer on Halo 4
- Brianna Wu - Game developer and co-founder of Giant Spacecat, and, in wake of the Gamergate controversy, entered into politics to try to address issues raised during Gamergate.

== Y ==
- Michiru Yamane - Japanese video game composer known for her work with Konami and the Castlevania series.
- Corrinne Yu - American game programmer who started her career with the King's Quest series for the Apple II. Yu wrote the original engine for the Spec Ops series, and was a founding member of Microsoft's Direct 3D Advisory Board.

== Z ==
- Jen Zee - Art director for Supergiant Games.
