= Nathalie Japkowicz =

Canadian computer scientist

- Education: McGill University; University of Toronto; Rutgers University
- Scientific career
- Fields: Machine learning, big data
- Workplaces: University of Ottawa; American University College of Arts and Sciences

Nathalie Japkowicz is a Canadian computer scientist specializing in machine learning. She is a professor and department chair of computer science at the American University College of Arts and Sciences.

== Life ==
Japkowicz completed a B.Sc. at McGill University in 1988. She earned an M.Sc. from the University of Toronto in 1990. She completed a Ph.D. at Rutgers University in 1999.

Japkowicz worked at the University of Ottawa in the school of electrical engineering and computer science. She was the lead of its laboratory for research on machine learning for defense security.

Japkowicz is a professor and department chair of computer science at the American University College of Arts and Sciences. She researches artificial intelligence, machine learning, data mining, and big data analysis. In 2024, she was recognized in the Stanford-Elsevier Top 2% Scientists List.

== Research ==
Japkowicz has contributed work on mitigating class imbalance issues in machine learning. Particularly in classification problems, machine learning algorithms may overly favor the dominant class in a skewed dataset (see accuracy paradox). Japkowicz' research presents mitigation strategies such as focused oversampling and undersampling, or leveraging support vector machines on imbalanced datasets. In 2024, she published Machine Learning Evaluation: Towards Reliable and Responsible AI through Cambridge University Press, and now works in techniques for mitigating hate speech and misinformation.

== See also ==
- Autoencoder
- Synthetic minority oversampling technique
- Citation graph
- One-class classification
- Women in computing in Canada
