= Sanaa Shebbani =

Lebanese writer

- Born: Lebanon
- Education: BA in Elementary Education; MA in School Counseling
- Alma mater: Lebanese American University
- Occupations: Writer, translator
- Years active: 2002–present
- Awards: won the Sharjah Award for Children Book for her book "What Have You Decided, Malik?, 2012

Sanaa Shebbani (Arabic: سناء شباني) is a Lebanese children's writer and translator. She wrote one play and has published more than 90 children's books. In 2010, UNESCO, Regional Bureau, Beirut, published her story book for youth Hatta Ankoulouka Ila Alami as she was chosen after attending a workshop as part of the program Beirut, World Book Capital, 2009: Reinforcing the Cultural Diversity in the Storybooks Dedicated to Youth. In 2012, her book What Have You Decided, Malik? won the Sharjah Award for Children's Book. In 2017, her book The Battle of Antara Ibn Shaddad was shortlisted for Etisalat Award for Arabic Children's Literature in the Young Adult's Book category. In 2022, her story book Ziyara Gheir Moutakaa: Gibran Khalil Gibran was considered distinguished for excellence by the International Board on Books for Young People (IBBY) Honour List 2022.

== Education and career ==
Sanaa Shebbani is a Lebanese translator and children's writer. She has a bachelor's degree in Elementary Education from the Lebanese American University, and earned a master's degree in School Counseling. Since 2006, Shebbani works in the University of Balamand as a Project Officer, developing educational material and train the trainers on issues related to health and education. From 2002 until 2012, Shebbani was a screenwriter for "Noura Noura" magazine which was issued by the University of Balamand. From 2004 until 2014, she participated in writing some stories and entertainment activities for "Al-Arabi Al-Sagheer" magazine issued by the Ministry of Information, Kuwait. For four-year, Shebbani has also written some short stories and activities for two Lebanese magazines "Tuta Tuta" and "Ahmed" both issued by Dar El Hade'k. She has also translated some English Children's short-story books into Arabic including "Kisses for Daddy" by the Australian author Frances Watts. Till now, Shabbani has published more than 90 books for children and young adults; she also wrote one play Azraq ya Zahr which was directed by Karim Dakroub in 1999. In 2011, her story Jamila wal Nabi' (Jamila and the Spring) won the award of "Learn to Care" In 2012, her book What Have You Decided, Malik?, published by Dar Al Maaref Bookshop Co. Publisher in 2011, won the Sharjah Award for Children Book. While her book The Battle of Antara ibn Shaddad was shortlisted for Etisalat Award for Arabic Children's Literature for category of Young Adult's Book.

== Works ==
Some of her works include:

- "The Violinist Defies the Flute Player" (original title: Azefata al Kaman Tatahada A’zaefata Al Nay", 2002
- "Cookee to Solve Problems" (original title: Cookee li Hal Al Mashakeel), 2002
- "A Butterfly and A Worm" (original title: Farasha wa Dooda), 2004
- "A Cat and A Fish" (original title: Famaka wa qeeta), 2005
- "Huda and The Red Lip Stick" (original title: Huda wa Ahmar Al Sheefah), 2005
- "We Think, Learn, and Memorize … In the Heart of the Holy Quran" (original title: Nufaker, Nata’alm, Nahfad, fi Rehab Al Quran Al Kareem), 2006
- "From a Tree to another" (original title: Min Shajarah ela Shajarah), 2007
- "The Strange Dance" (original title: Al Raksa al A’jeeba), 2007
- "Things Disappear in Our House" (original title: Fi Manzleena Takhtafi Al Ashyaa), 2007
- "The Small Camel Humps" Translated (original title: Hadoob Al Jamal Al Satheer), 2008
- "Help Me, I Help you" (original title: Saa’edni Usaa’eduk), 2008
- "Kisses for Daddy" Translated (original title: Kubolat li Abi), 2008
- "Mr. Watermelon ” (original title: al Ustath Bateekh), 2009
- "The Journey of a Phoenician Merchant" (original title: Rehlat Al-Tajeer Al-Feneeqi), 2009
- "In the Company of Elisa" (original title: Fi Sohbat Elisa), 2009
- "How Do I Maintain my Health With Food?” (original title: Kaifa Uhafd Ala Sehati bil Gathaa), 2009
- "How Do I Succeed with the Least Effort Possible?” (original title: Kaifa Angah Bi Akal Majhood Momkn?), 2009
- "Purple Colors in the City of Tyre" (original title: Alwan Urgwania fi Madenat Al Sor), 2009
- "Isis in Jubail" (original title: Isis fi Madenat Jubail), 2009
- "Cadmus and the Alphabet" (original title: Cadmus a huroof al Abjadia), 2009
- "How Do I Make My Friends and Become the Trustful Among Them?” (original title: Kaifa Asna' Ashabi wa Asbah Al Ahl Bainahum), 2009
- "The Story of a Fisherman" (original title: Hikayat Sayad Al Samak), 2009
- "How to Convince My Family to Go Out on a Vacation?”, (original title: Kaifa Uqnee' Ahli bil Khroog Haithu Argab Youm al-Utla), 2009
- "I have a Cold!” (original title: Ana Musab bl rushah!), 2010
- Abu Basala, 2010
- "Rawan’s Hiccups" (original title: Hazouqat Rawan)
- "What have you Decided, Malik?” (original title: Matha Qarart Ya Malik?), 2011
- “The Biography of the Last Donky" (original title: Seerat al Hemar Al Akher), 2012
- "The Guard of the River" (original title: Harees Al Nahr), 2012
- "Hala the Inventor" (original title: Hala al Mokhtareea), 2012
- "How Did I exist?” (original title: Kaifa J’at), 2012
- "Stories of the Letters" (original title: Qesas Al Horouf), 2013
- "Galia in the School" (original title: Galia fi al Madrasa), 2013
- "The Secret of the Confused Star" (original title: Sir Al Najma Al Haera), 2013
- "Doctor, Shaddah" (original title: Doctor Shaddah), 2014
- "Adventures in the forest of Kawaed "Ta’a al-Marbouta" ” (original title: Moghamara fi Ghabat al-Kawaed), 2014

== Awards ==
- 2011: her book "Jamila and the Spring" won "Learn to Care"
- 2012: her book "What Have You Decided, Malik?" won the Sharjah Award for Children's Book.
- 2017: her book "The Battle of Antara ibn Shaddad" was shortlisted for Etisalat Awad for Arabic Children's Literature for Young Adult's Book category
