= Sentient weapon =

Common plot device in works of fantasy, mythology, and science fiction

A sentient weapon is a common plot device in many works of fantasy, mythology, and science fiction, and is related to the classic motif of the magic sword. Sentient weapons may be human, robotic, or magical (as is the case with any non-technological weapons, such as a sword), but not all magic weapons are sentient. A sentient weapon may experience a moral conflict from its specific nature as a weapon, or may function as the villain, which, through its intelligence, is able to gain power. Another possibility is that it assists the wielder, or is merely neutral.

== In fantasy and mythology ==
- Kullervo's Sword from the Kalevala
- Anglachel – The Silmarillion
- Stormbringer – The Elric Saga
- Nightblood – Warbreaker (a.k.a. Sword Nimi – The Stormlight Archive)
- Kazid'hea – The Legend of Drizzt
- Need – The Oathbound and subsequent novels
- Sword of Summer – Magnus Chase and the Gods of Asgard

== In film and television ==
- Skynet and Terminators – Terminator
- Byakkoshinken (Saba) – Gosei Sentai Dairanger (Mighty Morphin Power Rangers)

== In video games ==
- Grimoire Weiss – Nier
- Aigis – Persona 3
- Master Sword – The Legend of Zelda
- Eyelander – Team Fortress 2
- Transistor – Transistor
- Soul Edge and Soul Calibur – Soulcalibur series
- Umbra – Elder Scrolls series
- Lilarcor – Baldur's Gate II
- The weapons in Boyfriend Dungeon
- Modwyr – Pillars of Eternity II: Deadfire
- Caliburn – Sonic and the Black Knight
- Blades - Xenoblade
- Finnean, The Talking Weapon - Pathfinder: Wrath of the Righteous
- Maken – Maken X
- Kenny - High on Life

== In anime and manga ==
- Senketsu – Kill la Kill
- Several characters in the Soul Eater series
- Derflinger – The Familiar of Zero
- Shushus in Wakfu series
- Ashgan – The Witch and the Beast
- Several characters in the Noragami series

== In music ==
- Sword and Gun – Paris Texas' double EP; They Left Me With The Sword and They Left Me With A Gun

== See also ==
- Magic sword
- List of fictional robots and androids
- Lethal autonomous weapon
