= Reine Abbas =

Lebanese video game designer

- Education: University of Balamand Lebanese Academy of Fine Arts
- Occupations: Video game designer; Video game director; CEO; Associate Professor
- Years active: 2003–present

Reine Abbas is a Lebanese video game designer and artist who is one of the first female game designers in the Middle East. Abbas co-founded Wixel Studios in 2008, one of the first independent game studios in Lebanon.

== Biography ==
In 2000, Abbas earned her Master's degree in Visual Arts from the University of Balamand. From 2002 through 2008, Abbas attended the DigiPen Institute of Technology, located in Redmond, Washington. She later established the art department at DigiPen in Lebanon, serving as the department head over a period of 6 years.

In 2008, Abbas co-founded Wixel Studios, the first independent game studio in Lebanon. The name "Wixel" was chosen as it stands for "weird pixel" in recognition of being the only game studio in the region at the time. The studio's first released game was Douma, where the player controlled government leaders as puppets, and was considered a "political football" at the time. Abbas took inspiration after witnessing political violence in Lebanon.

Abbas is a co-founder and CEO of SPICAtech, a school that teaches young people skills needed to design and produce video games. Originating out of a request from her 4-year-old son to learn how to create a video game, Abbas was motivated by the popularity of digital games within the MENA region. One of the academy's goals is to encourage designers to create original video games rather than Arabizing existing games. Abbas also teaches a course on Game Design and Development at Lebanese University

Abbas regularly gives talks at workshops and conferences, and advocates for women to join the video game industry. Abbas serves as associate professor at Lebanese Academy of Fine Arts (ALBA) and Lebanese American University (LAU). She is also an instructor of Game Design at (LAU and the Lebanese University (LU).

== Awards and honors ==
- In 2010, Abbas won the "Innovation in ICT" Award, presented by the Women in Information Technology
- In 2011, Abbas was a speaker at TEDx Beirut
- In 2013, Abbas was recognized as one of the "5 most powerful women in gaming" by Inc. magazine
- In 2019, Abbas was a finalist for the Cartier Women's Initiative which recognizes women entrepreneurs
- In 2019, Abbas was featured in Forbes

Abbas was selected as one of the World's 100 Most Powerful Arab Women two years in a row by Arabian Business.

== See also ==
- List of women in the video game industry
