= Tanya X. Short =

American video game designer

Tanya X. Short speaks at the Indie Soapbox during the 2017 Game Developers Conference.

Tanya X. Short is an American video game designer. She is a co-founder of Kitfox Games, an independent video game studio in Montreal, Canada. She was the lead designer for titles including Shattered Planet (2014) and Moon Hunters (2016). In 2012, she co-founded the organization Pixelles, which aims to increase gender diversity in video game development.

== Early life ==
Short was raised in California, United States. She lived in home that was "in the middle of the desert" so she would often play video games rather than play with other children. Short's mother also disliked "passive entertainment" such as television, so her mother bought the family a Nintendo Entertainment System, feeling as though playing video games is a more "active" activity for the brain. As a teenager, Short would spend her time meeting other people through massively multiplayer online (MMO) games.

Short knew she wanted to work as a video game writer after volunteering her time as a community manager and content designer for an online game. She attended college in Portland, Oregon, to study English literature. In 2006, she applied for the master's degree program in video game design at SMU Guildhall in Texas. Upon graduating from SMU Guildhall in 2008, Short received a few job offers to work on MMO games at video game companies. She chose to work for Norwegian video game developer Funcom, which was at the time working on the online game Age of Conan.

== Career ==
At Funcom, Short worked as a narrative designer, designing levels and boss fights for MMORPGs. She moved to Montreal, Canada, in her mid-twenties at the request of her employer, which wanted to take advantage of attractive tax subsidies offered by the province to the video game industry. She participated in meetings held by the Montreal Gaming Society, which Short recalls helped her integrate into the local gaming community even though she did not speak French. In 2012, Short and game hobbyist Rebecca Cohen Palacios founded Pixelles, a non-profit organization which has organized free events to teach video game development to women, non-binary people, transgender people, and people from other marginalized groups.

Around 2013, when Funcom halted its activities in Montreal to continue its activities in North Carolina, Short chose to stay in Montreal and became unemployed. In 2013, she founded Kitfox Games with three other people. The studio soon developed the game Shattered Planet, released in 2014, as part of a video game incubator; Short acted as lead designer of the game. As lead designer of the studio's later project Moon Hunters (2016), she was motivated to create a game that used procedural generation to create "personal player narratives." Short later discussed the studio's focus on inclusivity when designing Boyfriend Dungeon (2021), a dungeon crawler game about dating one's weapons, which meant also giving the player options to date women and non-binary characters despite the title of the game.

== Bibliography ==
- Short, Tanya; Adams, Tarn, eds. (2017). Procedural Generation in Game Design. CRC Press. doi:10.1201/9781315156378. ISBN 9781498799195. S2CID 69727455.
- Short, Tanya; Adams, Tarn, eds. (2019). Procedural Storytelling in Game Design. CRC Press. doi:10.1201/9780429488337. ISBN 9781138595309. S2CID 241639037.
