= Women in computing in Canada =

Many in Canada share concerns about the current and future roles of women in computing, especially as these occupations increase in importance. As in many nations where computing and information technology are large industries, women in Canada have historically faced underrepresentation in education and industry. As a result, some Canadian women pursuing careers in these fields have had a lack of role models and faced sexism. There are many institutions and initiatives in Canada, however, which seek to increase representation for women in computing fields, as well as the fields of natural science and engineering in general.

== Inequalities ==
=== In education ===
As is typical in North America, the enrollment of women in computing disciplines at the post-secondary level is significantly lower than the enrollment of males. According to Statistics Canada, in 2009, there were 33,219 students nationwide enrolled in "Mathematics, computer and information sciences" coursework, with only 9,075 of them being women (27%). This is significantly lower than 3 years earlier (2005/2006), when 37% of women did the same. The decline in the enrollment of women in computer science and related coursework is mirrored in the US.

Another summary published by Statistics Canada shows that this trend is not recent; between 1992 and 2007, the number of annual female university graduates in computer science has remained roughly constant (with a slight increase between 2000 and 2004), whereas the number of male graduates has increased approximately 50% (with the 2004 value almost double that of the 1992 value). Relatively speaking, there were about twice as many male graduates as females in 1992 and three times as many in 2007.

A study looking at enrollment based on program and gender was done at the University of Waterloo in 2010. At Waterloo, the percentage of the undergraduate population studying computer science that were women was only 11.5%, with a slight increase at the Master's (18.4%) and PhD (17.1%) levels. Waterloo, one of the only universities in Canada to have a higher percentage of male students than female students, is an extreme example, but the trend is constant across many computer science departments in the country.

=== In the workforce ===
As of 2011, the GDP of the Canadian Information and Communications Technologies (ICT) sector was $62.7 billion and grew at an annualized rate of 3.8% between 2002 and 2011. Meanwhile, the overall economy grew at an annualized rate of 1.9%, reflecting the relative importance of ICT sector in Canada. The percentage of women working in the industry mirrored that of the percentage of women receiving computing education. Statistics Canada reports that in 2012, there were approximately 1,299,300 people employed in the "Professional, scientific and technical services", of which 548,800 were women (42%). This category also includes those working in legal and accounting services (which are typically much more gender balanced), so the actual percentage working in the computing field is likely much lower than this.

== Attempts to address inequalities ==
Although the reasons for the lack of participation of women are multifaceted and are not fully understood, it is accepted that they partly stem from the perceived image of the field, a lack of understanding of what work in the field consists of, and a lack of encouragement. Correspondingly, many institutions (both ones that are independently organized and ones that are funded by the Government of Canada through universities) have come into existence to inform and encourage potential computing students. In addition, many universities and other organizations offer gender-specific scholarships in attempts to increase enrollment numbers.

=== Institutions and organizations ===
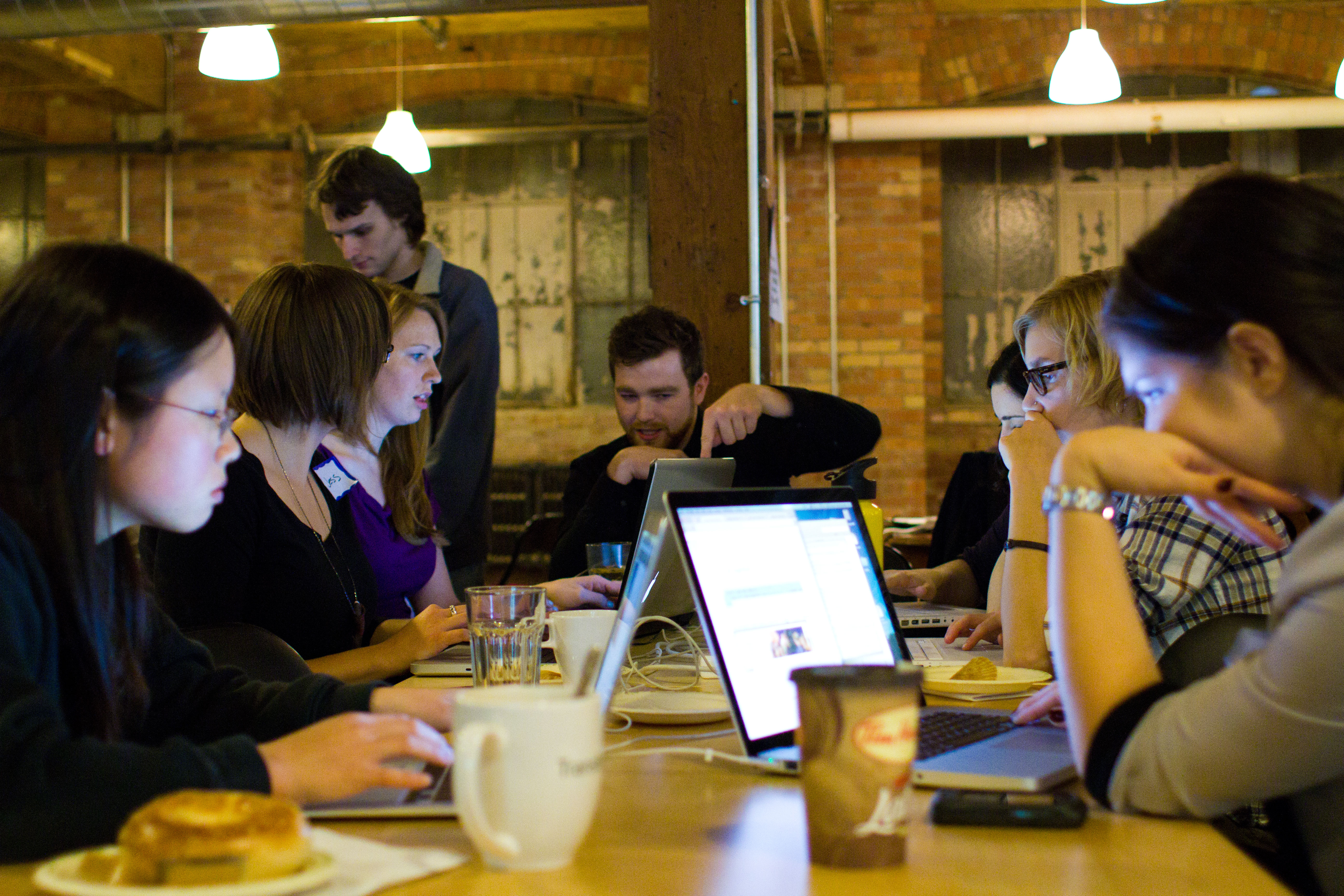
A Ladies Learning Code workshop in Toronto.

Canada has several not-for-profit organizations dedicated to supporting women in computing disciplines.

- Chic Geek is a Calgary-based not-for-profit which creates opportunities for women to explore their geeky sides, inspire one another, and build meaningful personal and professional relationships. They organize technical workshops for women and girls as well as networking events.
- Pixelles is a Montreal-based not-for-profit which hosts incubators and follow along programming to help women learn skills to develop video games.
- Dames Making Games is a Toronto-based not-for-profit which hosts workshops, "game jams" and social events to support women learning to create games.

Many Canadian universities also have resources designed for women in underrepresented disciplines such as computer science.

- The University of Toronto hosts monthly lunches for female students and faculty in Computer Science and manages a mailing list.
- The University of British Columbia has a "Focus on Women in Computing (FoWCS)" committee which aims to increase the participation of women in computer science "at all academic levels".
- Simon Fraser University has a Women in Computing Science (WICS) group that hosts professional networking events, technical workshops, outreach programs, and social activities.
- The University of Waterloo has a Women in Computer Science organization (WICS).
- The School of Computing at Queen's University has a Women in Computer Science organization (WISC).
- The University of Manitoba has a Women in Computer Science (WICS or UMWICS) group that organizes professional networking events, technical workshops, outreach programs, and social activities.

=== Initiatives and scholarships ===
Several scholarships exist for Canadian women in computing (some of which being international).

- Google Canada offers the Anita Borg Memorial Scholarship for outstanding female Canadian undergraduates and graduates in Computer Science.
- The University of British Columbia offers a scholarship for upper-year computer science, with preference to female candidates.

Many universities also have programs in place to encourage interest in computer science, especially for high school students.

- Waterloo's Centre for Education in Mathematics and Computing holds an annual workshop in computer science for young women, which students from across the country can apply for and are accepted into through a lottery system.

=== Celebrations of Women in Computing Events ===
Several region-based celebrations, modelled after the Grace Hopper Celebration of Women conference, have taken place over the past several years in conjunction with the ACM-W:

The Ontario Celebration of Women in Computing (ONCWIC):

- 2010 - Kingston, ON - Chair: Wendy Powley, Queen's University
- 2011 - Toronto, ON - Co-Chairs: Kelly Lyons & Renée J. Miller, University of Toronto
- 2012 - London, ON - Chair: Hanan Lutfiyya, Western University
- 2013 - Kitchener/Waterloo, ON - Chair: Kate Larson, University of Waterloo
- 2014 - to be held in Guelph, ON - Chair: Rozita Dara, University of Guelph

The Atlantic Celebration of Women in Computing:

- 2011 - Sackville, NB - Chair: Laurie Ricker, Mt. Allison University

The Pacific Northwest Celebration of Women in Computing:

- 2014 - to be held in Vancouver, BC - Chair: Anne Condon, University of British Columbia

In 2014/2015, Ontario Celebration of Women in Computing and Pacific Northwest Celebration of Women in Computing joined forces and became the Canadian Celebration of Women in Computing (CAN-CWiC):

- 2016 - Ottawa, ON
- 2017 - Montreal, QC
- 2018 - Halifax, NS
- 2019 - Toronto, ON
- 2022 - Toronto, ON

== International comparison ==
Many of the statistics reported by Canadian studies and agencies are similar to those found in North America as a whole. In the US, the percentage of computer science degrees awarded to women dropped from 37.1% to 26.7% between 1984 and 1998. In addition, a recent survey indicated that less than 12% were awarded to women in 2010-2011. Like Canada, the US has many scholarships and initiatives in place to attempt to address this (e.g., the Anita Borg Institute).

Asia exhibits some different trends. In Southeast Asia, a more equal gender distribution in the discipline has been reported. Cultural reasons have been cited for this, as well as the perception that computing is an employable field, which results in greater parental encouragement to pursue careers in the field regardless of gender. The percentage of students who are women enrolled in undergraduate computer science programs was 51.4% in Malaysia in 1991, greater than 50% in Singapore in 1987, and 55% in Thailand in 1998. In India, women graduates from IIT Bombay in engineering grew from 1.8% in 1972 to 8% in 2005, which, although still low, is the opposite of the downward trend observed in North America.

The statistics for Europe show an even smaller participation than North America for some countries, and a slightly higher participation for others (primarily Scandinavian countries). The Czech Republic had 9.6% women enrolled in 2001, Germany had 10.5% in 2000, the Netherlands had 6.6% in 1999, Slovenia had 6.7% in 1999, and Switzerland had 11.4% in 2001. By contrast, Finland had 20% in 1997, Iceland had 24% in 2000, Norway had 23.2% in 1999, and Sweden had 30% in 2000. The United Kingdom was approximately in the middle at 19% in 1999.

== Notable Canadian Women in Computing ==
- Beatrice Helen Worsley, the first female computer scientist in Canada.
- Anne Condon, head of UBC's computer science department and fellow of the Royal Society of Canada.
- Nathalie Japkowicz, professor and department of chair of computer science at the American University College of Arts and Sciences
- Gail C. Murphy, UBC computer science professor and associate dean in the faculty of science, fellow of the Royal Society of Canada, cofounder and Chief Scientist at Tasktop Technologies.
- Karen Reid, University of Toronto computer science professor and recipient of several teaching awards.
- Caterina Fake founder of Flickr

== See also ==
- Women in engineering#Canada
- Women in computing
- Women in science
