= The Shrouded Isle =

2017 video game

- Developer: Kitfox Games
- Publisher: Kitfox Games
- Composer: François-Xavier Bilodeau
- Engine: Unity
- Platforms: macOS; Microsoft Windows; Nintendo Switch
- Release: macOS, Windows; 4 August 2017; Nintendo Switch; 17 January 2019
- Genre: Management simulation
- Mode: Single-player

The Shrouded Isle is a 2017 management simulation video game developed and published by Kitfox Games.

== Gameplay ==
Gameplay screenshot.

The Shrouded Isle is a Lovecraftian-themed management simulation video game, in which the player is placed in charge of a sacrificial village cult that worships a god who intends to bring about an apocalypse in three years. The player is in charge of five families that occupy the village; their personalities, habits, and vices are procedurally generated.

== Development and release ==
The Shrouded Isle was developed by Kitfox Games. It is the third product from the four-person independent video game development studio. It is based on The Sacrifice, a game the team had created for a game jam in 2015. The Shrouded Isle was announced in October 2016 with a scheduled released date of February 2017, however the game was released a later date of 4 August 2017 for Windows and macOS. The game was subsequently released for Nintendo Switch on 17 January 2019.

== Reception ==
The Shrouded Isle received mixed reviews on Metacritic.
