= Kitfox Games =

Canadian video game developer

- Type: Private
- Industry: Video games
- Founded: 2013; 13 years ago
- Founders: Tanya X. Short; Jongwoo Kim; Xin Ran Liu; Mike Ditchburn
- Headquarters: Montreal, Canada
- Number of employees: 12 (2024)
- Website: kitfoxgames.com

Kitfox Games is an indie game development studio based in Montreal, Canada. It was co-founded by Tanya X. Short, Jongwoo Kim, Xin Ran Liu, and Mike Ditchburn in June 2013.

== History ==
According to Short, the founders never worked together before and knew each other as semi-acquaintances at a local independent developer meetup in Montreal. After forming a studio, the team participated in a game jam in which they created and submitted their jam entry Sculptorgeist, which became a winning finalist. Kitfox Games began development of their first game, Shattered Planet, as a procedural death labyrinth game. Shattered Planet was released on iOS and later Android, Microsoft Windows, and MacOS in 2014.

In March 2019, Kitfox Games partnered with Bay 12 Games to be its publisher for the Steam and itch.io version of Dwarf Fortress. According to a frequently asked questions post, Kitfox Games would manage its relationship with Steam and contractors while Bay 12 Games co-creator Tarn Adams would handle the technical side of the game.

As of 2024, their website lists 14 developers, 12 employees and two of the original co-founders – Tanya X. Short and Xin Ran Liu.

== Games published ==
Year	Title	Developer(s)
2014	Shattered Planet	Kitfox Games
2016	Moon Hunters	Kitfox Games
2017	The Shrouded Isle	Kitfox Games
2018	BadCupid	Kitfox Games
2019	Fit for a King	Kitfox Games
2019	Six Ages: Ride Like the Wind	A Sharp
2020	Lucifer Within Us	Kitfox Games
2020	Ostranauts (early access)	Blue Bottle Games
2021	Boyfriend Dungeon	Kitfox Games
2022	Pupperazzi	Sundae Month
2022	Dwarf Fortress	Bay 12 Games
2023	Six Ages 2: Lights Going Out	A Sharp
2024	Caves of Qud	Freehold Games
2026	Thousand Hells: The Underworld Heists	A Sharp
TBA	Loose Leaf: A Tea Witch Simulator	Kitfox Games
TBA	Streets of Fortuna	Kitfox Games
