= Pupperazzi =

2022 video game

- Developer: Sundae Month
- Publisher: Kitfox Games
- Director: Isobel Shasha
- Producers: Levi Rohr; Ryan Huggins
- Designer: Fisher Wagg
- Programmers: Ben Sironko; Ryan Huggins
- Artist: Campbell Fletcher
- Writer: Fisher Wagg
- Composer: Jack Yeates
- Platforms: macOS; Windows; Xbox One; Xbox Series X/S; Nintendo Switch
- Release: macOS, Windows, Xbox One, Xbox Series X/S; January 20, 2022; Nintendo Switch; April 6, 2023
- Genre: Photography
- Mode: Single-player

Pupperazzi is a photography game developed by Sundae Month and published by Kitfox Games. The game was released on January 20, 2022 for macOS, Windows, Xbox One, and Xbox Series X/S. A Nintendo Switch port was released on April 6, 2023. Players control a humanoid camera, earning followers by taking photos and sharing them on the in-game social media site, dogNET. Pupperazzi received mixed reviews upon release.

== Gameplay ==
Pupperazzi is a photography game played in a first-person view. Players control a humanoid camera, earning followers by taking photos and sharing them on the in-game social media site, dogNET. Players get feedback on photos that they share on dogNET, receiving comments from their followers. Photos can be shared as many times as the player wants, but sharing too many results in followers calling them spam. To progress through the game, the player needs to earn followers, which unlocks upgrades, locations, and different times of the day. Players can accept photo requests, which are rewarded with golden bones and followers upon completion. Golden bones are used to buy upgrades from vending machines, enabling the player to complete more complex photo requests.

== Development and release ==
Pupperazzi was developed by indie studio Sundae Month. The idea of the game was created during an internal game jam as an arcade-style photography game. Development lasted from late 2018 to 2019, but the project was later scrapped. The team liked the game's concept and revived the project in 2019 to work more on it. Lead developer Isobel Shasha stated that the team wanted to preserve multiplayer, but it became "too complicated" and "just ultimately wasn't possible".

The game was announced by a trailer on May 24, 2019, with a later release date on Steam that same year. On August 25, 2020, Kitfox Games was announced as the publisher of Pupperazzi during the Wholesome Snack showcase of the Wholesome Games event. On June 12, 2021, a trailer was released during the Wholesome Direct of E3 2021, showing off a location called Muttropolis. On August 10, 2021, the game was confirmed to launch on Xbox One and be available for Xbox Game Pass subscribers. The game was released for macOS, Windows, Xbox One, and Xbox Series X/S on January 20, 2022. It was released for Nintendo Switch in April 2023.

== Reception ==
Reception

Aggregate score
Aggregator	Score
Metacritic	PC: 70/100 (Note: Score based on 13 reviews.); XONE: 66/100 (Note: Score based on 8 reviews.)

Review scores
Publication	Score
Game Informer	7.25/10
GameSpot	5/10
Hardcore Gamer	3.5/5
Shacknews	6/10
Digitally Downloaded	4.5/5

Pupperazzi received "mixed or average reviews" according to review aggregator Metacritic.

Jill Grodt of Game Informer gave the game a 7.25/10, describing it as a "wonderful game to jump into", but believed that the game didn't always convey things clearly. GameSpot's Jessica Howard gave the game a 5/10, praising the game's concept, but criticizing the overall experience, calling it "incredibly empty". She also criticized the roughness of the frame rate, the jerkiness of the camera, and the lack of content in the game. Marcus Estrada, reviewing for Hardcore Gamer, gave the game a 3.5/5, saying that the game "immediately impresses", but was disappointed by the lack of content.

Ozzie Meija of Shacknews rated the game 6/10, commending the amount of filter and lens options, but criticized the lack of incentive to complete objectives, the few locations in the game, and the animations of the dogs, calling them "rough". Lindsay Mayhew of Digitally Downloaded lauded the game, characterizing it as "perfectly happy". She felt that the saving system was unclear, calling it a "frustrating communication oversight".
