= Quarterstaff: The Tomb of Setmoth =

1988 video game

- Developer: Infocom
- Publisher: Activision
- Designers: Scott Schmitz; Ken Updike
- Platforms: Classic Mac OS, PC-98, X68000
- Release: 1988
- Genres: Interactive fiction, role-playing
- Mode: Single-player

Quarterstaff: The Tomb of Setmoth is an interactive fiction role-playing video game developed by Scott Schmitz and Ken Updike and released by Infocom for Classic Mac OS in 1988. The game includes a text parser, graphics, a dynamically updated map, and a graphical interface that incorporates Mac OS hierarchical menus.

== Overview ==
The player takes the part of Titus, a former blacksmith sent by the Druid Council to explore the remains of an underground colony of druids who vanished without a trace. During the course of his adventures, Titus may befriend other characters and persuade them to join his party. Character skills improve with practice, and the game tracks the hunger, thirst and energy levels of characters.

== Release history ==
Quarterstaff: The Tomb of Setmoth was based on Quarterstaff, a game released by Simulated Environment Systems in 1987. Simulated Environment Systems designed the game to support add-on modularity, and planned to create a town module to serve as a hub from which to send the characters of Quarterstaff on other adventures, retaining their inventories and experience.

Activision purchased the rights to the game from Simulated Environment Systems in 1988, and released the game with improvements including color graphics, an upgraded interface, and writing input from Amy Briggs. Infocom revised the narrative voice from a mix of second and third person to a consistent third person narration. The box cover art was by Ken Barr and was reproduced in a color poster packaged with the game. Versions for the Apple IIGS and IBM PC were announced but never released due to low sales. A planned sequel titled Storm Giants was never released.

Infocom billed Quarterstaff as their first fantasy role-playing game, although Beyond Zork, released the previous year, had role-playing game elements. Quarterstaff was part of Activision's strategy to broaden Infocom's appeal in the wake of their acquisition of Infocom in 1986. Activision hoped to build on Infocom's tradition of text-based adventures by adding graphics in an attempt to attract players increasingly accustomed to more complex games that made use of rapidly evolving hardware. Quarterstaff and BattleTech: The Crescent Hawk's Inception (1988) were the first two Infocom games developed by outside sources; both broke from Infocom traditions as graphically rich role-playing games.

StarCraft, Inc. released Japanese language versions of Quarterstaff for PC-98 in 1990 and X68000 in 1991.

== Reception ==
The Simulated Environment Systems version of Quarterstaff was reviewed positively in Dragon, which called it "among the finest fantasy role-playing games available for any system" and "the most true to form FRP game we've found". Dragon praised the game's NPC artificial intelligence and the need to coordinate the actions of player characters. The Dragon reviewers gave the game 5 out of 5 stars.

Macworld reviewed the Simulated Environment Systems version of Quarterstaff, praising its UI, stating that the "Interface lets you concentrate on solving game puzzles, rather than on the quirks of the interface". Macworld furthermore praises its "flexible" gameplay, expressing that "Quarterstaff offers a refreshing degree of flexibility in the types of activity it will accept. You can divide your group to explore different rooms ... In combat, you can engage in missile fire across room boundaries - Eolene can stand out of harm's way and fire arrows at a monster in the next room while Bruno and Titus charge in and attack face-to-face. The ability to direct individual or group efforts gives you a certain amount of tactical creativity." Macworld also praises the sound, automap feature, graphics, and lack of 'instant death' traps, instead allowing the player to escape triggered traps, or bring other members of the party to rescue them. They call Quarterstaff "a new approach to an old computer-game genre." Macworld however heavily criticizes a fatal glitch in their 1.0 review copy; one of the puzzles required to complete the game is unable to be completed.

MacUser magazine rated the Simulated Environment Systems version of Quarterstaff four out of five mice, calling it a "must-have" for fantasy role-playing fans and saying that it "closely approximates what it's like to play a non-computer fantasy role-playing game." MacUser suggested that newcomers to role-playing games might prefer a lighter, less time-intensive introduction to the genre.

Tilt gave the Infocom version of Quarterstaff 18 out of 20, singling out the game's digitized sound and high quality writing, and describing the interface as a model of flexibility. Tilt praised the game's blend of role-playing and adventure game elements and called Quarterstaff the best game they'd seen on the Macintosh that year.

== Feelies ==
Infocom included extra novelty items called feelies with their packaged games. Included with Quarterstaff were:

- A parchment, titled "The Path to Enlightenment"
- A wooden druidic coin, which could be used in conjunction with the parchment and an in-game wand to identify items
- A color poster
