= Boyfriend Dungeon =

2021 video game

- Developer: Kitfox Games
- Publisher: Kitfox Games
- Director: Tanya X. Short
- Designer: Tanya X. Short
- Programmer: Marcelo Cunha Perez
- Artist: Xin Ran Liu
- Writers: Meg Jayanth; Jill Murray
- Composer: Ramsey "Marskye" Kharroubi
- Platforms: Windows; Switch; Xbox One; Xbox Series X/S; PlayStation 5
- Release: Windows, Nintendo Switch, Xbox One, Xbox Series X/S: WW: August 11, 2021; PlayStation 5: WW: February 14, 2023
- Genres: Dungeon crawl, dating sim
- Mode: Single-player

Boyfriend Dungeon is a dungeon crawler-dating sim developed and published by Kitfox Games. Taking place in an urban fantasy setting, the player character must fight through dungeons with the help of a human partner who can transform into a sentient weapon. Outside of dungeons, the player can date their partner in visual novel-style sequences that increase their power in combat. It was released for the Nintendo Switch, Xbox One, and Microsoft Windows on August 11, 2021, followed by a PlayStation 5 version on February 14, 2023.

== Plot ==
The player character, whose pronouns are selectable and can be he/him, she/her, or they/them, lives in Verona Beach, a city in a contemporary fantasy world where monsters pose a danger to people. Through dating, the player character meets various people who can turn into weapons. Together, they fight monsters in dungeons created from the player character's anxieties, known as "dunj" in the world's slang.

== Gameplay ==
The player can make choices in visual novel-inspired segments that affect relationships with weapons.

The game's combat takes place in real time from an isometric perspective. The player can perform different combos depending on their weapon. Outside of combat, there are visual novel-style dating sequences that allow the player to choose their responses.

Going on dates and succeeding in combat increases a weapon's Love Rank, allowing the player to choose different abilities to use with that weapon in battle. The player can remain in a platonic relationship with the weapon people and still receive the same benefits in combat. A cat is available for a platonic relationship only.

The game has a crafting system, allowing the player to create gifts to give to the weapon people, clothes that give various bonuses, and zines that give new abilities in combat.

== Development and release ==
The game was funded via Kickstarter, where it raised $272,000 and surpassed its goal. One of its characters, Rowan, was designed by the artist of Hatoful Boyfriend. The developers stated that they wanted to make the romance elements "as inclusive as possible" and therefore allow players to date women and non-binary characters, despite the game's title.

During development, the player character was at first a complete self-insert character. The writers then added a story arc of the player character overcoming anxiety about dating, which was purposely left as a minor subplot so that the player character could be used "a little bit as a fantasy vehicle".

On September 10, 2020, it was announced that the game would be delayed to 2021 to protect the developers' mental health. Additionally, some content was cut from the game so that it would be released "at a time that isn't like... 2025."

On August 17, 2022, the Secret Weapons update was released for free, adding a new dungeon and three new romanceable characters.

== Reception ==
Reception

Aggregate score
Aggregator	Score
Metacritic	(NS) 72/100 (PC) 70/100 (XONE) 74/100 (XSX) 70/100

Review scores
Publication	Score
Game Informer	7/10
IGN	6/10
Nintendo Life	6/10
Shacknews	8/10

Boyfriend Dungeon received "mixed or average" reviews, according to review aggregator Metacritic.

GamesRadar+ stated that "the game feels perfectly weighted to suit those who love either genre, yet doesn't alienate new players." PCGamesN called it "an intriguing curio." IGN gave the game a mixed review, saying that "Boyfriend Dungeon offers a fun spin on the dating sim formula, but its roguelite parts don't always mix well with developing romance." Nintendo World Report liked the dialogue between characters, saying, "The writing across all the dates is strong, alternating between tongue-in-cheek and sincere at a pleasant cadence."

While criticizing the handling of some of the game's topics, Nintendo Life enjoyed the dungeon crawling aspects of the game, "Combat is satisfying and snappy, and the reward loop keeps you wanting to come back for more." Polygon felt the game could be poorly paced at points, with Boyfriend Dungeon's two dungeons being easy to complete, "This all felt compounded by how quickly I was able to breeze through the two dungeons, as well. It felt satisfying in the moment to hack and slash my way through the levels, but each of the big fights came and went without much difficulty." Game Informer liked the dateable partners of the game, writing that most had interesting backgrounds: "Not every storyline hit a home run, but each character is unique and easily relatable."

Boyfriend Dungeon was nominated for the Games for Impact category for The Game Awards 2021.
