= Lucifer Within Us =

2020 video game

- Developer: Kitfox Games
- Platforms: Windows, Mac
- Release: 15 October 2020
- Genre: Adventure
- Mode: Single-player

Lucifer Within Us is a 2020 video game created by independent developer Kitfox Games. The game is a fantasy-themed detective adventure game in which players are an exorcist. Set over three cases, players explore crime scenes, collect evidence and interrogate witnesses to identify demons who have possessed the perpetrators of murder. Upon release, the game received generally favorable reviews, with critics praising the narrative and detective gameplay, whilst critiquing the game's short length.

== Gameplay ==
Lucifer Within Us

In Lucifer Within Us, players assume the role of Sister Ada, an exorcist in a world where demons possess victims and cause them to commit murder. Gameplay takes place over three cases, building in difficulty. The objective of the role is to examine crime scenes for evidence, question witnesses and suspects for testimony, and deduce the identity of the culprit. Players collect evidence and question characters using point and click controls, with information stored at the bottom of the screen in a toolbar that records collected evidence, descriptions of the suspect and a timeline of actions undertaken by the suspects. When players confront characters with contradictions in evidence in dialog, players can enter the mind of the suspect and investigate their personality and potential motives. Once players have collected enough evidence to infer the identity of the killer, they can formally make an accusation and allege the means, motive and opportunity of the murderer. If successful, the culprit provides a confession and is exorcised, completing the case.

== Development and release ==
Lucifer Within Us was self-published by Kitfox Games, a development studio based in Montreal, Canada. The game was announced at E3 2019, and a game demo was showcased at PAX West in the same year. The developers cited the Shin Megami Tensei series as an influence on the game's concept.

== Reception ==
Reception

Aggregate score
Aggregator	Score
Metacritic	76/100

Review score
Publication	Score
Adventure Gamers	3/5

Lucifer Within Us received "generally favorable" reviews, according to review aggregator Metacritic. RPGamer praised previews of Lucifer Within Us for its open-ended approach to its mystery gameplay, and its stated its focus on "investigation and interrogation" instead of penalties for failure allowed "anyone to dive into the game". GamesRadar commended the game's "emotionally involved" narrative and detective gameplay, although found the short length of the game to be a "disappointment" despite the "satisfying" ending. Describing the game as one of the "best detective games on PC", PC Gamer stated "It's over too quickly, but this is a fun detective game with some cool ideas, like witness and suspect testimonies being presented as an interactive timeline." Dread Central enjoyed the game's "visually pleasing" aesthetics, "lively" voice acting and "well-paced" narrative, finding the game was "tad short" but the right length "to get invested in without feeling like the gameplay and narrative were redundant".
