= Dames Making Games =

Feminist gaming non-profit organization

- Formation: 2012
- Founders: Cecily Carver, Alex Leitch, Jennie Faber
- Dissolved: 2024
- Type: Nonprofit
- Headquarters: 32 Lisgar St, Toronto, Ontario, M6J 0C9, Canada
- Location: Toronto
- Services: Damage Camp, New Game Makers
- Official language: English
- Website: dmg.to

Dames Making Games (DMG) was a Toronto-based non-profit organization that provided resources, including game-development mentors and a multitude of events such as game jams, social gatherings, and workshops, for gender minorities interested in the video games industry. Through the opportunities they provided, Dames Making Games aimed to create a comfortable platform, that was inclusive and contrary to male-dominated gaming culture, for women, non-binary, femme and queer people to explore video game development.

== History ==
The beginning of the organization can be traced to a 2011 program held by TIFF Nexus called The Difference Engine Initiative (DEI), also held in collaboration with the Hand Eye Society, to help educate young women in game development. The co-founder Cecily Carver, inspired by her experience in the program and sensing desires for the continuation of the community, thought of creating a platform to diversify the demographic of people in the game developing industry. Such a platform differed from the DEI's hierarchical structure of an expert instructing participants, as it emphasized the importance of a supportive, community-based space for game designers to collaborate. Organizing around the name Dames Making Games, Craver recruited Jennie Faber to help host meetings. Soon after, Alex Leitch was recruited to help with the creation of DMG.

After being founded in 2012, the group held workshops, game jams, social events, and other gaming-related activities, aimed to educate and support gender-diverse gamers, citing the male-dominated culture of gaming as a barrier faced by many would-be players and developers. DMG hoped to help make the scarce amount of women in video game development more proportional to account for the fact that women make up about half of the population of game players. DMG's goals also included diversifying the depiction of gender in games to better reflect the breadth of human experience. DMG and its founders had such diversity goals because they maintained that exclusion in game development spheres manifested itself in game storylines and characters. In 2015 and 2016, the group collaborated in organizing Indigicade, a video-game development initiative aimed at Indigenous girls and women.

== Challenges ==
By 2013, Dames Making Games had a small group of supporters ranging from around 30 to 40 members. As Dames Making Games grew, criticism towards the organization's stated purpose and benefits became more vocal, primarily from men within the gaming world that would question whether women needed a specific safe space within the industry. According to some perspectives, challenges lie in the fact that putting an end to mistreatment of underrepresented groups in gaming requires total change in the perception of such groups to emphasize the importance of their place in gaming's community and culture. These strides would entail changes in game development and audience reception.

Some argue that women struggle with how their participation in gaming communities in general evokes a focus on their gender, making them spokespeople for all women in gaming industries. Others find issue with the creation of Women in Games initiatives to begin with, arguing that their emphasis on women is inherently exclusionary to others.

== Impact ==
As games become progressively relevant to people's lives, the lack of diversity in game development and content that DMG attempts to improve grows more prominent and impactful. Dames Making Games, and similar initiatives involving communities of underrepresented gamers, exemplify the positive impact that supportive communities of inclusion can have on potentially intimidating and exclusive gaming spheres dominated by men. DMG acted as an informal space for women and other adults in the gaming industry to learn technical skills required for game development. This informal community of learning was especially helpful in supporting women seeking to work in the gaming industry.

The emergence of DMG is an example of the kinds of communities that arose and grew to address desires for alternative game development spaces and encouraged people of different identities to create their own works. For instance, Bipolar Journey, a game made by Dames Making Games participant Theo Jean Cuthand, had a story and other aspects specifically constructed around the creator's own experience with mental illness and treatment. One of DMG's co-directors, Gabriela Aveiro-Ojeda, sought to weave her own culture into her games and use game development to contribute to discussions on social issues.

Dames Making Games was one of multiple gaming community organizations established in Toronto that contributed to the city's dense gaming scene and culture. Some people involved in game development feel such a dense gaming presence is beneficial due to how it establishes a knowledgeable community of cooperation and creativity in an area.

== Insolvency ==
In 2024, the Dames Making Games directorship filed for insolvency. Key reasons stated for the insolvency included a loss of grant opportunities to fund the organization, resulting in over $100,000 CAD in debt, core member and directorship burnout, and severe accounting errors resulting in an inability to correctly manage their financial situation.

== Programs/Events ==
=== Damage Camp ===
Dames Making Games hosted Damage Camp, an event consisting of workshops and discussion panels, with guest speakers talking about a variety of topics related to women in gaming. Topics included creating an inclusive environment for video game developers, gaining financial stability in the industry, and the incorporation of different minority groups within the gaming community. This event was made available to the general public and no membership was needed to register.

=== New Game Makers ===
In part of DMG's Fall speaker series, New Game Makers was a workshop that introduced individuals to game development and supplied them with tools to get started.

== See also ==
- Women in computing in Canada
- Black Girls Code
- Native Girls Code
- Women Who Code
- Pixelles
