= Moon Hunters =

2016 video game

- Developer: Kitfox Games
- Publisher: Kitfox Games
- Platforms: Windows, Linux, OS X, PlayStation 4, Xbox One, Nintendo Switch
- Release: Windows; March 10, 2016; Linux, OS X; April 1, 2016; PlayStation 4; NA: July 19, 2016; PAL: August 30, 2016; Xbox One; July 19, 2017; Nintendo Switch; October 26, 2017
- Genres: Action role-playing, roguelike
- Modes: Single-player, multiplayer

Moon Hunters is an action role-playing game developed and published by Kitfox Games. It was released on March 10, 2016 for Windows through the download service Steam, for Linux and macOS on April 1, for PlayStation 4 on July 19, 2016 for Xbox One on July 19, 2017 and the Nintendo Switch on October 26, 2017. The game received mixed critical reception, which praised the game's unique gameplay, graphical style and storytelling, but criticized the short length and lack of combat depth.

== Gameplay ==
A co-op, roguelike action role-playing game that is described by the developer as a "personality test RPG", Moon Hunters lets up to four players choose from one of six different characters, each with their own strengths and weaknesses. They must set out on a dangerous journey to bring the moon back to the fantasy land of Issaria and stop the evil Sun Cult. The game's endings can differ widely depending on the choices the characters make during the journey, and the outcome of the final battle. The areas of the game are procedurally generated and will differ for each playthrough. However, information about past playthroughs is saved in the form of constellations.

== Plot ==
One night in the fantasy land of Issaria, the moon does not rise. As the source of all magic and spiritual power, its disappearance imbalanced the world, and the game's heroes must set out to restore the balance again. Without the moon's power, monsters infest the land, causing chaos and spreading danger.

The story of the game is non-linear, and changes depending on the actions of players all the way up to and including the ending.

== Development ==
The lead designer of Moon Hunters, Tanya Short, was heavily motivated by the idea of creating a game that used procedural generation to create "personal player narratives". In order to do that, she had to find a way for players to become invested in quests that were randomized. Instead of using traditional good/evil moral duality, the game bases characters' actions around their own distinct personalities. The game uses a campfire system to build the players' bonds with their characters, and focuses on breadth of potential experiences over the depth of the game itself.

The game was designed with its ancient Mesopotamian setting in mind. The game's story was influenced by ancient myths from a number of different sources, though sometimes a version of a myth was chosen that better reflected modern egalitarian values. Despite a heavy amount of research, the lead designer regretted not being able to hire an expert on Sumerian history to make the myths more accurate.

== Reception ==
Reception

Aggregate score
Aggregator	Score
Metacritic	PC: 62/100; PS4: 63/100; NS: 69/100

Moon Hunters has garnered mixed reception, holding an aggregate score of 62/100 on Metacritic for the PC version of the game.

Sam Wachter of RPGamer gave the game a 4/5, calling the game's writing "gorgeous" and the world "atmospheric". She also praised the game's soundtrack and overall gameplay, but criticized its lack of online co-op and the fact that it was not as fun playing it in singleplayer. She also called the game's length "too short".

Davis Cox of Kill Screen scored the game 65/100, saying it "nobly aims for the stars", but that the gameplay is unbalanced with repetitive and "overpowered" moves, though the game's story makes up for this.

Edge Magazine gave the game a score of 60/100, commending the game on allowing you to "elope with the final boss", but saying that the game ends more quickly than expected.
