= Synthetic minority oversampling technique =

Statistical oversampling method

In statistics, synthetic minority oversampling technique (SMOTE) is a method for oversampling samples when dealing with imbalanced classification categories within a dataset. The problem with doing statistical inference and modelling on imbalanced datasets is that the inferences and results from those analyses will be biased towards the majority class. Other solutions undersample the majority class to be equivalently represented in the data with the minority class. Instead of undersampling the majority class, SMOTE oversamples the minority class. However, this technique has been shown to yield poorly calibrated models, with an overestimated probability to belong to the minority class.

== Limitations ==
SMOTE does come with some limitations and challenges:

- Overfitting during the training process
- Favorable outcomes in the machine learning process, but questionable translation to practical uses
- Synthetically created sample may belong to a different class
- Synthetic data may not match the original distribution of the minority class

== Variations ==
Two variations to the SMOTE algorithm were proposed in the initial SMOTE paper:

- SMOTE-NC: applies to datasets with a mix of nominal and continuous data
- SMOTE-N: accounts for nominal features, with the nearest neighbors algorithm being computed using the modified version of Value Difference Metric (VDM), which looks at the overlap of feature values over all feature vectors

Other variations include:

- ADASYN: use a weighted distribution for different minority class examples according to their level of difficulty in learning
- Borderline-SMOTE: only the minority examples near the borderline are over-sampled
- SMOTE-Tomek: applying Tomek links to the oversampled training set as a data cleaning step to remove samples overlapping the category boundaries
- SMOTE-ENN: uses the Edited Nearest Neighbor Rule, which removes any example whose class label differs from the class of at least two of its three nearest neighbors

== Algorithm ==
The SMOTE algorithm can be abstracted with the following pseudocode:

if N < 100; then
    Randomize the T minority class samples
    T = (N/100) ∗ T
    N = 100
endif

N = (int)(N/100)
k = Number of nearest neighbors
numattrs = Number of attributes
Sample[ ][ ]: array for original minority class samples
newindex: keeps a count of number of synthetic samples generated, initialized to 0
Synthetic[ ][ ]: array for synthetic samples

for i <- 1 to T
    Compute k nearest neighbors for i, and save the indices in the nnarray
    Populate(N , i, nnarray)
endfor

Populate(N, i, nnarray):
    while N != 0
        Choose a random number between 1 and k, call it nn
        for attr <- 1 to numattrs
            Compute: dif = Sample[nnarray[nn]][attr] − Sample[i][attr]
            Compute: gap = random number between 0 and 1
            Synthetic[newindex][attr] = Sample[i][attr] + gap ∗ dif
        endfor
        newindex++
        N = N − 1
    endwhile
    return

where

- N is the amount of SMOTE, where the amount of SMOTE is assumed to be a multiple of one hundred
- T is the number of minority class samples
- k is the number of nearest neighbors
- Populate() is the generating function for new synthetic minority samples

If N is less than 100%, the minority class samples will be randomized, as only a random subset of them will have SMOTE applied to them.

== Implementations ==
Since the introduction of the SMOTE method, there have been a number of software implementations:

- imbalanced-learn
- smote_variants: implementation of 86 SMOTE variations
- ImbalancedLearningRegression

== See also ==
- Stratified sampling
- Oversampling and undersampling in data analysis
