= Tarn Adams =

American video game programmer (born 1978)

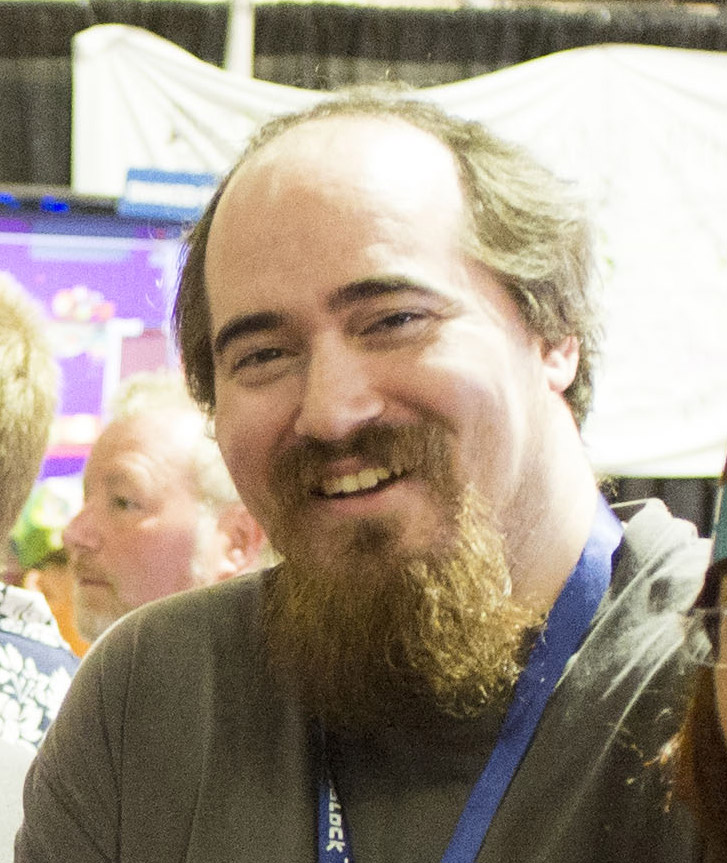
- Adams at PAX 2013
- Born: April 17, 1978 (age 48); Silverdale, Washington, U.S.
- Education: University of Washington (BSc); Stanford University (PhD)
- Occupation: Computer game programmer
- Years active: 1996–present

Tarn Adams (born April 17, 1978) is an American computer game programmer, best known for his work on Dwarf Fortress. He has been working on the game since 2002 together with his older brother Zach. He learned programming in his childhood, and took up designing computer games as a hobby. In 2006, he quit during his first year of a mathematics post doctorate at Texas A&M University to focus on game development.

== Early life and education ==
Tarn was born in Silverdale, in the U.S. state of Washington, in 1978. His father, Dan, worked at a waste water treatment plant and used to work in data management. He taught his sons the rudiments of coding at an early age and this shared interest allowed the brothers Tarn and Zach to remain close to each other despite their family's constant shifting due to their father's work. The brothers grew up playing computer games, drawing their own renditions of the randomly generated creatures they encountered, and logging their journeys in detail. In fifth grade, Tarn wrote his first animation game with Zach. Explaining his reluctance to socialize, he said, "I was a get-home-from-school, get-on-the-computer kind of kid." Tarn stated that the main reason they started writing games was to play them themselves, and they soon began introducing complicated and unpredictable behavior to achieve more replayability.

In sixth grade, they developed their first fantasy game, called Dragslay and written in BASIC. It consisted of single battles leading to a final encounter with a dragon. A few years later, Tarn rewrote it in the C programming language, and it featured minute details and kept track of populations of units in the generated world. In high school, Tarn and Zach created a spacecraft game that simulated sections of a rocket blowing off and released their first publicly available game on America Online.

After Dragslay, Tarn and Zach started working on another adventure game, focusing on procedural world generation. For this, they drew inspiration from the role-playing video game hit Ultima. After working on the project for four years and rendering it in 3D graphics, they released it under the title Slaves to Armok: God of Blood. "Armok" was the name of the game's deity from the variable "arm_ok", which was used in Dragslay to indicate how many arms were left on a particular unit. The addition of a random story generator was inspired by both of them being avid story writers. Tarn said, "you could zoom in on your character, and it'd tell you how curly his leg hairs were, and the melting and flash points of various materials, It was insane." The brothers posted it on their website in 2000, but by 2004 the project started to face increasing problems. Tarn announced in 2004 on his forums that he was going to shift his main project from Armok to a side project called Dwarf Fortress.

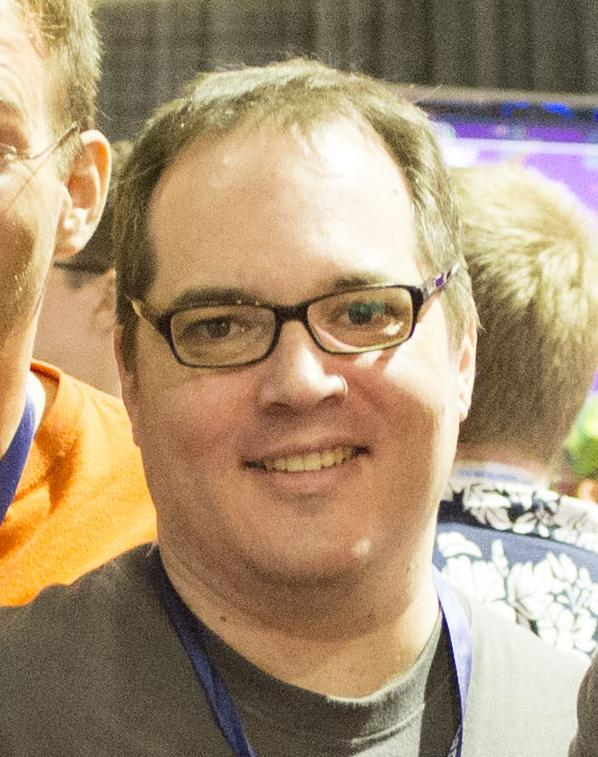
Adams' older brother, Zach, in 2013

Tarn earned a degree in mathematics at the University of Washington. He began his doctoral studies at Stanford University, completing them in 2005 with a dissertation titled "Flat Chains in Banach Spaces", which was published in The Journal of Geometric Analysis. During his first year at Stanford, he said he was under heavy pressure, that the professional environment and competitiveness affected him negatively. He also cited a dilemma he was facing between studying mathematics and developing video games. This stressful situation drove him for a time into depression and he admitted to having had a brief stint with narcotics.

=== Shift to game development ===
The Adams brothers started a company called Bay 12 Games, where they developed and released freeware games, attracting a small following. Tarn assumed the alias "Toady One" and Zach "ThreeToe". Tarn's background in mathematics helped in the development of algorithms with three dimensional spatial considerations. With his skill in programming and Zach's background in ancient history and storytelling, together the brothers designed and developed various projects. They worked on other small projects during graduation which were released on their website. Tarn put up a PayPal button after a request from a fan; similarly, a subscriber system was added later. In the next five months, they made around $300, which brought in only enough to cover their site's $20 hosting cost. They made side projects like Corin and Kobold Quest in a few days and Squiggles was made in three hours. Other titles were Liberal Crime Squad and WWI Medic.

In 2006, Tarn started his post doctorate in Texas A&M, which was his goal since his undergraduate days. He decided to leave during the first year due to increasing stress and is said to have broken down in the department head's office. After being offered to stay another year and a $50,000 stipend, he agreed and eventually left to devote his full attention to developing Dwarf Fortress and other games, which was until then only a hobby. He said, "At the end of a math problem, you have a paper and maybe you publish it, and the paper can be a building block for the edifice of mathematics, but to me that's not so important. But working on a problem and having a game when you're done? That's pretty damn cool."

== Dwarf Fortress ==
After quitting university, Tarn thought he would use up his savings after a year ($15,000) so he looked for a job to sustain himself. Dwarf Fortress was originally started in October 2002 as a two-month side project, but was suspended soon after due to the brothers' focus shifting to Armok. In the meantime he had also developed a game called Mutant Miner. It was a turn-based game where players look for minerals and dig out tunnels while dealing with threats. He realized the need to be able to manage many miners and not only have a high score list, but also store more minute details, which was the beginning of the project.

The game's primary mode is set in a procedurally generated fantasy world in which the player indirectly controls a group of dwarves and attempts to construct a successful and wealthy underground fortress. Its development kept on until 8 August 2006, when the first alpha version was released. Donations reached $800–$1000 in the following months, this average increased gradually until Tarn and Zach were financially stable. They then decided to solely rely on donations. The game eventually attracted a cult following and various web communities devoted to it were formed. Videogame journalists later covered the game. They focused on it being a two-member project surviving through donations. Critics praised its complex, emergent gameplay but had mixed reactions regarding its difficulty.

The game uses CP437 text-based graphics and is open-ended with no main objectives. It is a part construction and management simulation and part roguelike game due to its multiple game modes. Before playing, the player has to generate worlds with continents, oceans and histories documenting civilizations. The main game mode, Dwarf Fortress mode, consists of selecting a suitable site from the generated-world, establishing a successful colony or fortress, while fighting threats like goblin invasions, accumulating wealth, and taking care of the dwarves. Each dwarf is modeled down to its individual personality, has likes or dislikes, and specific trainable skills in various labors. The second game mode, Adventurer mode, is a turn-based, open-ended roguelike, where the player starts off as either an adventurer in the world, or the leader of an adventuring group, and is free to roam the land, complete quests, or explore old abandoned fortresses. The combat system is anatomically detailed with combat logs describing organs getting pierced, fat getting bruised, and limbs getting severed.

Continuing its development, Tarn calls it his life's work and said in 2011 that version 1.0 will not be ready for at least another 20 years, and even after that he would continue to work on it. The game influenced Minecraft, Terraria, and various other games. It was selected among other games to be featured in the Museum of Modern Art to show the history of video gaming in 2012. There is an active community of fans of the game, and Tarn said they have helped them in the development of the game in addition to providing monetary support. Fans have also made creative interpretations of the game. In the past, he and his brother sent crayon drawings or short stories to the donors, customized to their requests, and displayed the donors who have donated the most on their website.

Adams moved to the United Kingdom in 2024.

== Inspirations and preferences ==
Tarn has cited books, movies, pen and paper role-playing games and other computer games, experienced during his childhood, as an inspiration for the various games he developed. He said the works of J.R.R. Tolkien and tabletop games like Dungeons & Dragons and Cyberpunk 2020 interested him, with fantasy and sci-fi being heavily influential. On Dwarf Fortress' wound-based system rather than regular hitpoints, he said, "Hit points are depressing to me. It's sort of a reflex to just have HP/MP, like a game designer stopped doing their job...You should really question all of the mechanics in the game from the bottom up." He has said he does not use version control for his works; however, this changed on Dwarf Fortress with the addition of another programmer.

Regarding his career, he said, "...but as far as design is concerned, I just think that I've happened to fall into a little sweet spot where I get a lot of freedom, but I guess the cost is my livelihood." He further said working in the gaming industry can be "soul crushing" for many people.

Adams has expressed his dislike for massively multiplayer online games and said that popular games are addictive because they make use of the player's compulsive hoarding trait.

== Bibliography ==
- Adams, Tarn (2015). "Simulation principles from Dwarf Fortress" (PDF). In Rabin, Steve (ed.). Game AI Pro 2. CRC Press. ISBN 978-1482254792.
- Short, Tanya; —, eds. (2017). Procedural Generation in Game Design. CRC Press. doi:10.1201/9781315156378. ISBN 9781498799195. S2CID 69727455.
- Short, Tanya; —, eds. (2019). Procedural Storytelling in Game Design. CRC Press. doi:10.1201/9780429488337. ISBN 9781138595309. S2CID 241639037.
