= University of Balamand =

Private university in Lebanon

Coordinates: 34°21′58″N 35°46′56″E

- جامعة البلمند
- Motto: والحق تعرفونه
- Motto in English: And you know what is right
- Type: Private
- Established: 1988; 38 years ago
- Affiliations: Greek Orthodox Church of Antioch
- Endowment: US$8,268,703
- President: Elias Warrak
- Faculty: 1177
- Administrative staff: 300
- Students: 5600
- Location: Balamand, El-Koura, Lebanon
- Campus: Suburban, 550,000 m2
- Newspaper: UOB Highlights
- Website: www.balamand.edu.lb

The University of Balamand (UOB; Arabic: جامعة البلمند) is a private university in northern El-Koura, Lebanon. The university is affiliated with the Greek Orthodox Church in Lebanon, but operates as a quasi-secular institution.

== Name ==
Balamand derives from the French Belmont, which was the name given by twelfth-century Cistercian monks to their first monastery in the Levant. This monastery was founded on a hill three hundred meters above sea-level, overlooking the coastal plain sixteen kilometers southeast of Tripoli and eighty kilometers north of Beirut.

== History ==
It was founded by the Orthodox Patriarch Ignatius IV of Antioch in 1988. The University of Balamand was founded by the Patriarch through the inspiration and endorsement of the Orthodox Antiochan committee, in which the concept formed between years 1983 and 1987, in the midst of the Lebanese Civil War. The project started soon after Governmental Clearance in 1988.

== Divisions ==
Administratively, the university consists of 9 faculties:

- Lebanese Academy of Fine Arts (French and English)
- St. John of Damascus Institute of Theology (Arabic, English and Spanish)
- Faculty of Arts and Sciences (Arabic, English and French)
- Faculty of Business and Management (English)
- School of Tourism and Hotel Management (English)
- Faculty of Sciences (English)
- Faculty of Engineering (English)
- Faculty of Health Sciences (English)
- Faculty of Medicine & Medical Sciences (English)
- Faculty of Postgraduate Medical Education
- Issam M. Fares Institute of Technology (English and French)

The university's main campus is adjacent to Balamand Monastery, but it has three other campuses in Dekwaneh Beirut, Souk El Gharb and Beino Akkar.

== Notable alumni ==
- Reine Abbas - Lebanese video game designer and artist
- John X of Antioch - Primate of the Greek Orthodox Patriarchate of Antioch
- Razan Ghazzawi - Syrian-Palestinian blogger and activist
- Bill Hinkle - American politician in Washington
- Elie Mitri - Lebanese actor, writer and stand-up comedian

== See also ==
- Lebanese Academy of Fine Arts
- El-Koura
- Greek Orthodox Christianity in Lebanon
