= Amy Briggs =

American video game implementor

- Born: 1962 (age 63–64); Minnesota
- Education: Macalester College
- Occupation: Video game implementer
- Years active: 1985–present
- Notable work: Plundered Hearts (1987)

Amy Ruth Briggs (born 1962) is an American video game implementor known for creating Plundered Hearts, an interactive fiction computer game published by Infocom in 1987.

== Early life ==
At one point in her youth, Briggs was a babysitter of Ron Gilbert, who went on to design the pirate-themed adventure game Monkey Island. A Minnesota native, she graduated from Macalester College in 1984 with a B.A. in English, specializing in British literature.

== Career ==
Already a fan of Infocom's games, Briggs joined the company in 1985 as a game tester. Working long hours playtesting games and learning the ZIL programming language, she quickly rose to the rank of implementor.

Briggs's literary background led her to write the company's only romance-genre text adventure. She also chose an explicitly female lead character, again unique for Infocom (other lead characters were either of unspecified gender, male, or allowed a choice of sex). She explained these choices by saying, "C. S. Lewis said he had to write The Chronicles of Narnia because they were books he wanted to read, and nobody else had written them yet. Plundered Hearts was a game I wanted to play."

Although Plundered Hearts was her only published text adventure, Briggs worked as a writer and editor on a number of other Infocom projects: she did a major rewrite of Quarterstaff, and helped to design "The Flathead Calendar", the main feelie included with Zork Zero. She was also briefly lead implementor on Milliways, the never-completed sequel to The Hitchhiker's Guide to the Galaxy. After Infocom was shut down in 1989, she returned to Minnesota where she attended graduate school, eventually earning a Ph.D. in cognitive psychology from the University of Minnesota. Then she went to work for 3M as a human factors engineer.

== See also ==
- List of electronic literature authors, critics, and works
- Digital poetry
- E-book#History
- Electronic literature
- Hypertext fiction
- Interactive fiction
- Literatronica
