= Cost-sensitive machine learning =

Cost-sensitive machine learning is an approach within machine learning that considers varying costs associated with different types of errors. This method diverges from traditional approaches by introducing a cost matrix, explicitly specifying the penalties or benefits for each type of prediction error. The inherent difficulty which cost-sensitive machine learning tackles is that minimizing different kinds of classification errors is a multi-objective optimization problem.

== Overview ==
Cost-sensitive machine learning optimizes models based on the specific consequences of misclassifications, making it a valuable tool in various applications. It is especially useful in problems with a high imbalance in class distribution and a high imbalance in associated costs

Cost-sensitive machine learning introduces a scalar cost function in order to find one (of multiple) Pareto optimal points in this multi-objective optimization problem (similar to the Weighted sum model)

== Cost Matrix ==
The cost matrix is a crucial element within cost-sensitive modeling, explicitly defining the costs or benefits associated with different prediction errors in classification tasks. Represented as a table, the matrix aligns true and predicted classes, assigning a cost value to each combination. For instance, in binary classification, it may distinguish costs for false positives and false negatives. The utility of the cost matrix lies in its application to calculate the expected cost or loss. The formula, expressed as a double summation, utilizes joint probabilities:

$\text{Expected Loss} = \sum_{i} \sum_{j} P(\text{Actual}_i, \text{Predicted}_j) \cdot \text{Cost}_{\text{Actual}_i, \text{Predicted}_j}$

Here, $P(\text{Actual}_i, \text{Predicted}_j)$ denotes the joint probability of actual class $i$ and predicted class $j$, providing a nuanced measure that considers both the probabilities and associated costs. This approach allows practitioners to fine-tune models based on the specific consequences of misclassifications, adapting to scenarios where the impact of prediction errors varies across classes.

== Applications ==
=== Fraud Detection ===
In the realm of data science, particularly in finance, cost-sensitive machine learning is applied to fraud detection. By assigning different costs to false positives and false negatives, models can be fine-tuned to minimize the overall financial impact of misclassifications.

=== Medical Diagnostics ===
In healthcare, cost-sensitive machine learning plays a role in medical diagnostics. The approach allows for customization of models based on the potential harm associated with misdiagnoses, ensuring a more patient-centric application of machine learning algorithms.

== Challenges ==
A typical challenge in cost-sensitive machine learning is the reliable determination of the cost matrix which may evolve over time.

== Literature ==
- Cost-Sensitive Machine Learning. USA, CRC Press, 2011. ISBN 9781439839287
- Abhishek, K., Abdelaziz, D. M. (2023). Machine Learning for Imbalanced Data: Tackle Imbalanced Datasets Using Machine Learning and Deep Learning Techniques. (n.p.): Packt Publishing. ISBN 9781801070881
