= Pixelles =

Feminist gaming non-profit organization

- Formation: 2011
- Type: Nonprofit organization
- Location: Montreal
- Official language: English, French
- Website: pixelles.ca

Pixelles, located in Montreal, is a non-profit grassroots organization devoted to increasing gender diversity in the video game industry as a response to issues of sexism.

== History ==
The debut of the Pixelles in Montreal coincided with the Twitter awareness hashtag campaign called #1reasonwhy, where women in the game industry provided personal experiences about sexism in the industry. The idea for Pixelles was inspired by Toronto's Difference Engine Initiative, a game-making incubator organized in 2011 by the Hand Eye Society, a video game arts organization. Feminists in Games, an organization of feminist digital researchers, approached game-hobbyist Rebecca Cohen Palacios and game designer Tanya Short to bring a similar project to Montreal. The first incubator had received over sixty applications. In 2015, Pixelles officially became a non-profit organization.

== Activities ==
Through annual incubators, game jams, and monthly workshops, Pixelles helps women realize their own potential at making whatever game they can dream of. As an art form, games benefit from having more diverse voices contributing to its growth.

Incubator, Follow Along, & Showcase
A set of classes that span once day a for six weeks provides advice on tools and applications, input from mentors, and support from the rest of the group. The incubator is open to anyone who identifies as female and can attend the workshops in Montreal, no former development experience required. Participants are selected through an application process. In 2013, ten women were chosen from over sixty applicants.

At the end of each incubator, Pixelles hosts a showcase to celebrate the new game makers. The 2013 showcase clocked over 150 attendees from friends to indies to people from AAA industry coming out to support and celebrate women and video games. The showcase is archived on the official website where you can play games from the 2013 and 2014 showcases.

Men could not sign up, but are able to participate either as mentors or as play-testers. They are also able to sign up for the follow-along program, where material and exercises covered in the program were posted online. Follow-Alongs do not have access to the meetings or the workspace, but they can still follow the deadlines and make a game. In 2013, out of over thirty follow along sign ups, four successfully made a game during the allotted time.

Workshops
Monthly workshops encourage them to learn new game development skills such as programming languages, 3d modelling, game design, etc. Volunteer led workshops are about 2 hours long with a maximum of 20 participants. They are usually hosted on the 2nd last Thursday or Tuesday evening of the month. Previous workshops covered topics such as working with Twine; an introduction to game design, 3D sculpting with ZBrush, 3ds max animation, programming with C#; and making a dating sim.

Mentoring
Through the 1:1 mentorship program and socials, Pixelles helps women network to gain role models and career advice. One of the most successful events was a speed mentoring night where twenty professionals and twenty aspirants conducted round-robin interviews.

The mentorship program connects aspiring and junior women in game development to experienced professionals. Mentors, who come from a network of experts from every discipline, are male and female. Mentors provide feedback on your portfolio, code, and/or CV while also discussing how to improve your chances in an increasingly competitive industry.

Social Events

- Picnic Socials
- Game Jams

Pixelles Petites
A future initiative of Pixelles which will be a coding camp for young girls.

== Recognition ==
The organization's contributions have been recognized by CNet, has used IndieGoGo for fundraising initiatives, has been sponsored by the International Game Developers Association Foundation, and has been sponsored by Unity, and Square Enix and Edios to send the Pixelles Ensemble, a group of 25 women and genderqueer game developers from 8 countries, to Game Developers Conference.

== See also ==
- Women in computing in Canada
- Dames Making Games
- Black Girls Code
- Native Girls Code
- Women Who Code
