= Plundered Hearts =

1987 video game

- Developer: Infocom
- Publisher: Infocom
- Designer: Amy Briggs
- Engine: Z-machine
- Platforms: Amiga, Apple II, Atari 8-bit, Atari ST, Commodore 64, MS-DOS, Mac
- Release: July 30, 1987
- Genre: Interactive fiction
- Mode: Single-player

Plundered Hearts is an interactive fiction video game created by Amy Briggs and published by Infocom in 1987. Infocom's only game in the romance genre, it was released simultaneously for the Apple II, Commodore 64, Atari 8-bit computers, Atari ST, Amiga, Mac, and MS-DOS. It is Infocom's 28th game.

== Plot ==
Plundered Hearts casts the player as a young woman in the late 17th century who has received a letter. Jean Lafond, the governor of the small West Indies island of St. Sinistra, says that the player's father has contracted a "wasting tropical disease". Lafond suggests that his recovery would be greatly helped by the loving presence of his daughter, and sends his ship (the Lafond Deux) to transport her.

As the game begins, the ship is attacked by pirates and the player's character is kidnapped. Eventually, the player's character finds that two men are striving for her affections: dashing pirate Nicholas Jamison, and the conniving Jean Lafond. As the intrigue plays out, the lady does not sit idly by and watch the men duel over her; she must help Jamison overcome the evil plans of Lafond so that they have a chance to live happily ever after.

== Development ==
As early as 1984, Infocom employees joked about the possibility of a romance text adventure, although The Boston Globe observed "somehow the moves don't seem appropriate to a computer keyboard". By 1987, the year of Plundered Hearts's release, Infocom no longer rated its games on difficulty level.

Although this was not the only Infocom game designed in an effort to attract female players (one example being Moonmist), it is the only game where the lead character is always female.

== Release ==
The Plundered Hearts package included an "elegant velvet reticule" (pouch) containing the following items:

1. A 50 guinea banknote from St. Sinistra
2. A letter from Jean Lafond reporting the illness of the player character's father

== Reception ==
Game reviewers Hartley, Patricia, and Kirk Lesser complimented Plundered Hearts in their "The Role of Computers" column in Dragon #128 (1987), citing its "gripping prose, challenging predicaments, and scenes of derring-do". Computer Gaming World said "this might be the perfect gift for your 'significant other' so that she can understand why interactive fiction is so fascinating". Compute! praised Plundered Hearts' writing and said that the game was suitable for both men and women. ANALOG Computing approved of the game's "intrigue, adventure and, yes, romance", but regretted that "most of Infocom's regular audience (presumably male) are likely to forsake this bold new endeavor" because of its genre.
