= Shattered Planet =

2014 video game

- Developer: Kitfox Games
- Publisher: Kitfox Games
- Engine: Unity
- Platforms: iOS, Android, Microsoft Windows, Mac OS
- Release: iOS; March 27, 2014; Android; April 10, 2014; Microsoft Windows, Mac OS; July 3, 2014
- Genre: Role-playing
- Mode: Single-player

Shattered Planet is a roguelike role-playing video game developed by Kitfox Games. The player assumes the role of a clone who is tasked with researching and cataloging alien wildlife. The iOS version was released on March 27, 2014. The Android version was released on April 10, 2014. Shattered Planet was released for Microsoft Windows and Mac OS on July 3, 2014.

== Gameplay ==
The game is set on a broken planet which is constantly changing and creating randomly generated maps for each level. The player must navigate and explore as much of the world as possible through a turn-based system which controls movement and combat on a tile-based map. The objective is to explore as many levels as possible while cataloging all of the alien wildlife in order to find a cure for a dark plague which is spreading across the galaxy. The plague spawns along the player in each level, spreading and spawning additional monsters as the player moves throughout the map.

The player advances through levels by navigating through the map and locating and activating a teleportation tile, while collecting scrap metal and crystals from slain enemies along the way. Bottles assigned with random effects which change each game are generated throughout each level, providing the player with a potential buff or debuff effect. Upon death, the player will lose all equipment and bottles equipped and found in the game, with a new clone being created and retaining any scrap metal and crystals.

There are various different clones that the player may choose, each with their own special ability and stats. Scrap metal may be used before starting a new game in order to purchase permanent stat upgrades for the selected clone. Crystals are used in order to produce various weapons and armour, with the developer stating that there are “over two hundred differently powerful items to find” within the game.

== Reception ==
Reception

Aggregate score
Aggregator	Score
Metacritic	iOS: 77/100

Shattered Planet received positive reviews from critics, with a score of 77/100 on Metacritic.

Richard Cobbett from PC Gamer gave the game 64/100, noting that it is "a clever, charming game", yet "it lacks the spark that makes return visits feel like a fresh adventure rather than a completionist chore".
