= Andrew Sheppard =

American video game executive

Andrew Sheppard is an American video game executive best known for his work in digital distribution and free-to-play game development. In February 2021, Andrew Sheppard took on the role of Managing Director at Transcend, a venture capital firm investing in the future of games and digital entertainment.

Prior to Transcend, Sheppard served as the CEO of GREE International Entertainment, a subsidiary of Japanese Internet media company GREE, Inc., a publicly traded company in Japan with a market capitalization of US$1.4 billion. Several years after joining GREE, Sheppard led a global initiative to refocus the business on its domestic operations in Japan, resulting in the shutdown of GREE International Entertainment on July 7, 2017.

Before joining GREE, Sheppard was the President of Kabam (developer and publisher of Marvel: Contest of Champions and Kingdoms of Camelot) from 2009 to 2014. He was the first hire with gaming expertise and was instrumental in propelling the company's growth to a record high of $400 million in revenue in 2014. Kabam was recognized in Deloitte's Technology Fast 500 as the 6th fastest growing company in 2014. Kabam was acquired for $800mm by Netmarble in 2017.
