= Deca Games =

German video game company

- Type: Subsidiary
- Industry: Video games
- Founded: 2016; 10 years ago
- Founder: Ken Go
- Headquarters: Berlin, Germany
- Revenue: ▲€156.05 million (2022)
- Number of employees: 814 (2022)
- Parent: Embracer Group (2020–present)
- Subsidiaries: A Thinking Ape Entertainment; Crazy Labs
- Website: decagames.com

Deca Games, stylized as DECA, is a German video games publisher and developer headquartered in Berlin. The company's focus is on acquiring and operating older free-to-play games as a service.

The company has also acquired a number of free-to-play mobile games, including DragonVale and multiple titles from Japanese publisher GREE (including Crime City, Knights and Dragons, Modern War and Kingdom Age).

== History ==
Ken Go, formerly general manager for Kabam's European headquarters, founded Deca Games in 2016 to handle live-operations for games. It acquired the massively multiplayer online shooter Realm of the Mad God from Kabam at that time.

In October 2019, Deca Games acquired mobile games Crime City, Kingdom Age, Knights and Dragons, and Modern War from Japanese publisher GREE. At the end of 2019, Deca Games acquired DragonVale from Hasbro, who closed down the game's developer Backflip Studios.

In August 2020, Deca was acquired by Embracer Group, which made it as the sixth operative group in the company to focus on free-to-play mobile games. In November, Deca acquired Canadian companies A Thinking Ape and IUGO Mobile Entertainment. In August 2021, Embracer acquired CrazyLabs, an Israeli mobile games company, and put in under Deca Games' operating group. In October, Deca acquired Jufeng, a game developer of Chinese company Gaea, and two games from Canadian developer Hothead Games. On February 21, 2023, Deca Games acquired the rights to various games developed by Next Games, including The Walking Dead: No Man's Land, due to Next Games' acquisition by Netflix.

Beginning in 2024, Deca began the process of taking over development of Star Trek Online from Cryptic Studios, with several Cryptic Studios personnel transitioning to Deca. Cryptic Studios was reorganized under Deca Games as a support studio. IUGO Mobile Entertainment, a former subsidiary, was shut down by Embracer Group in March 2025. On November 26, 2025, Embracer announced that Arc Games and Cryptic Studios had been divested through a management buyout, under a company named Project Golden Arc.

== Games ==
A Thinking Ape:

- Party in My Dorm
- Kingdoms at War
- Casino X
- Kingdom of Heckfire

Jufeng Studio:

- Castle Age
- Underworld Empire
- Elves vs Dwarves
- Dragons of Atlantis
- Kingdoms of Camelot: Battle for the North
- Heroes of Camelot
