= Disney Mirrorverse =

2022 video game

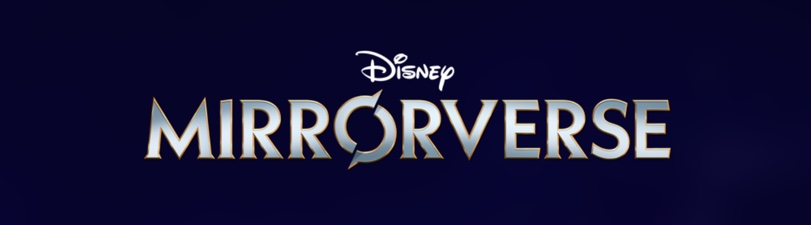
- Developer: Kabam
- Publisher: Kabam
- Engine: Unity
- Platforms: iOS, Android
- Release: June 23, 2022
- Genre: Action role-playing
- Modes: Single-player, Multiplayer

Disney Mirrorverse was a 2022 mobile role-playing game developed through a collaboration between Disney and Kabam. Set in an alternate universe adjacent to established Disney canon, the game featured reimagined versions of characters from various Disney and Pixar films, united in an original crossover storyline.

The game launched on June 23, 2022. It was generally well-received by players, though critical reviews were more mixed. Disney Mirrorverse officially shut down on December 16, 2024.

== Gameplay and premise ==
Disney Mirrorverse is an action role-playing game. The story takes place in a parallel universe called the "Mirrorverse" where locations from Walt Disney Pictures' films, such as Port Royal from Pirates of the Caribbean and Agrabah from Aladdin, have been transformed by dark and light magic. In the game, a sorcerer version of Mickey Mouse finds the mystical Stellar Mirror, which the Fractured (crystal-like monsters) want to destroy in order to break apart the Mirrorverse. To safeguard the Stellar Mirror, Mickey assembles the Guardians, who are alternate versions of characters from Disney's films and franchises. Guardians are unlocked through "Crystals", with each character having a star-rating that can be increased by obtaining duplicates. Having the option for team-based play allows for various "combos" to utilize the unique strategies and abilities of different characters.

Outside of the main storyline, other game modes include: "Alliance Missions" (players join an Alliance to compete against other Alliances to obtain rank-based rewards); "Tower of Talents" (players utilize themed teams of Guardians to move through levels to gain advancement items); and "Dangerous Dungeons" (players compete against one another in a dynamic dungeon setting to acquire progression items and other special rewards).

== Development and release ==
Disney Mirrorverse was a collaboration between Disney and interactive entertainment company Kabam. The two companies had formerly worked together on Marvel Contest of Champions and Star Wars: Uprising. Kabam soft-launched the game in the Philippines on April 14, 2020. In March 2022, the game's trailer was released. As of June 10, 2022, Disney reported 1 million pre-registered players, maxing out their Milestone Rewards track. The game was released worldwide on June 23, 2022. On September 17, 2024, Kabam disabled in-game purchases, removed the game from digital storefronts and announced that due to the game's storyline concluding, Disney Mirrorverse's servers were shut down on December 16, 2024. The latest Guardian, Cinderella, was released with the final update, one week before the shut down announcement.

== Reception ==
Reception

Aggregate score
Aggregator	Score
Metacritic	69/100

Review scores
Publication	Score
GameSpot	4/10
Gamezebo	4/5 stars
Pocket Gamer	4/5 stars

Disney Mirrorverse was generally well-received by players, though it drew criticism for its microtransactions. Review aggregator Metacritic, which uses a weighted average, assigned a game a score of 69 out of 100, based on 9 critical reviews, indicating "mixed or average reviews".

=== Player count and revenue ===
In 2022, before its official release on June 23, Disney Mirrorverse had over 1 million pre-registrations. By August 2022, Kabam reported that the game reached 5 million players. As of 2022, players had collectively spent 1.3 billion minutes (equivalent to over 21.6 million hours or almost 2.5 millennia) playing the game since its launch.

By September 2024, Disney Mirrorverse had generated approximately $34.1 million in lifetime gross revenue. The game made $5.8 million in June 2022, and later $273,000 in August 2024.

=== Awards ===
Disney Mirrorverse won the Best Mobile Game award at the Canadian Game Awards in 2023. It also won the Best Games & eSports award at the 15th Media Excellence Awards. At the Pocket Gamer Mobile Games Awards, the game won the People’s Choice Award in 2023.

== Other media ==
Viz Media released a series of books based on Disney Mirrorverse. In July 2023, Mirrorverse: Pure of Heart, centered on Snow White, was published. This was followed by Disney Mirrorverse: Belle, which was released in April 2024.
