= Holly Liu =

American businesswoman

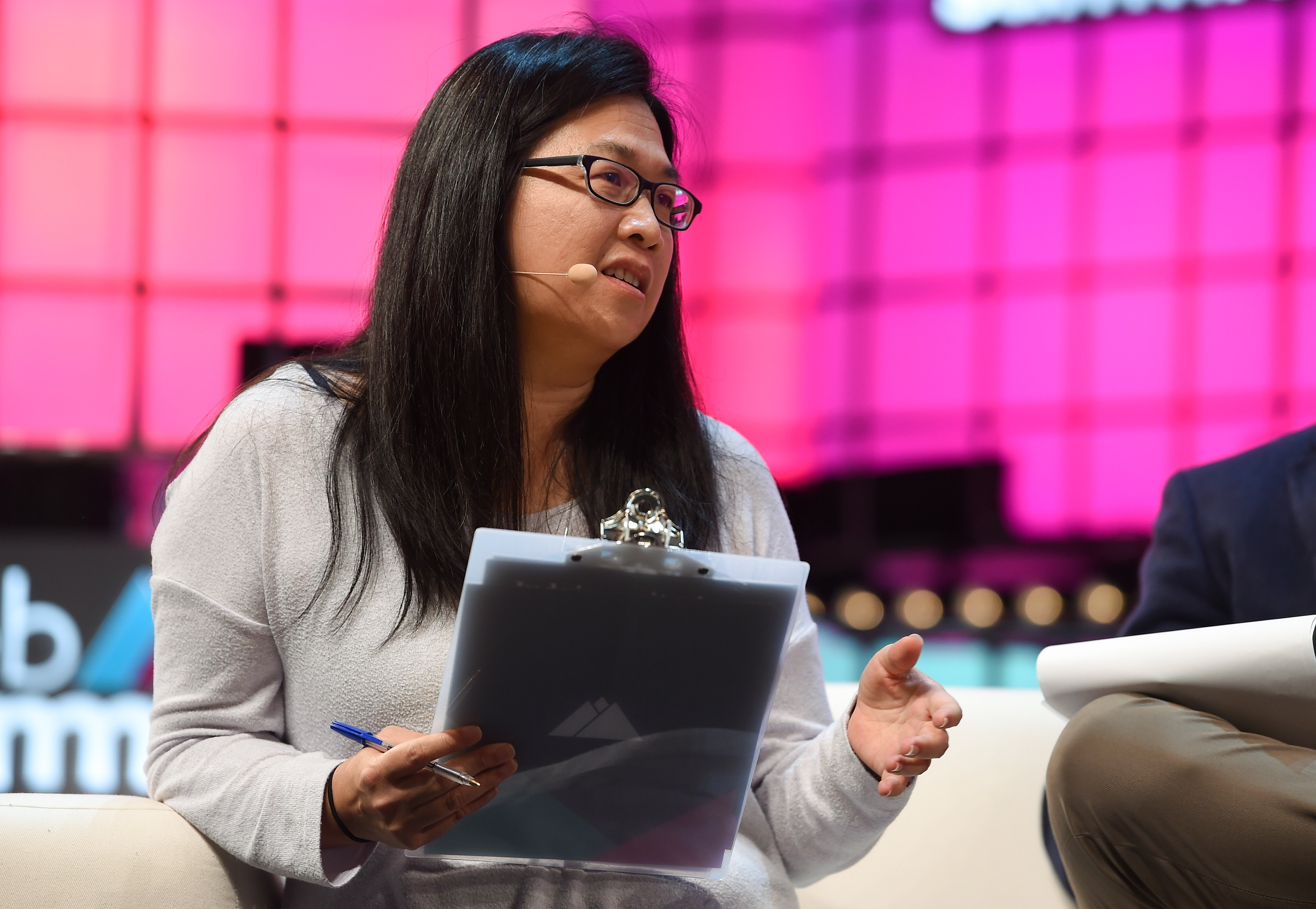
- Holly Liu in November 2018
- Occupations: Businesswoman and venture capitalist
- Known for: Co-founder of mobile gaming company Kabam

Holly Liu is an American businesswoman and venture capitalist. She is the co-founder of the mobile gaming company Kabam. She is currently Non-Executive Director and Strategic Adviser to Animoca's board of directors.

== Education ==
She studied at the University of California, Berkeley where she earned her master's degree in Information Management and Systems. She also studied at the University of California, Los Angeles where she earned her bachelor's degree in Communications and East Asian Studies.

== Career ==
Liu is the co-founded mobile gaming company Kabam in 2006; maker of the games: Kingdoms of Camelot, The Hobbit: Kingdoms of Middle-earth, and Marvel Contest of Champions. She was lead designer of their flagship game Kingdoms of Camelot, which grossed over $250 million in just four years. Liu was instrumental in growing the company's annual revenue from zero to $400m. She was also the founding mobile designer for the game extension Battle for the North, which made Kingdoms of Camelot the highest-grossing app for iPhone and iPad in 2012.

In January 2017, the majority of Kabam’s assets were acquired by Netmarble, South Korea’s largest mobile gaming company. Following her exit from Kabam, Liu took on a role as a visiting partner at Y Combinator, an accelerator providing seeded funding to nearly 2,000 startups with a combined value of over $80 billion.

In June 2018 she was appointed Non-Executive Director and Strategic Adviser to Animoca's board of directors.

In 2019 Liu worked as an advisor on The Sandbox, a decentralized gaming platform.

She is currently a member on the advisory board at University of California, Berkeley School of Information.

== Recognition ==
She has been named one of Fortune’s “10 Most Powerful Women in Gaming”, Forbes’ “12 Women in Gaming to Watch.” and Forbes - "10 Women Entrepreneurs to Watch from Google Ventures' Portfolio Companies".

She was also named by Inc as a Top 10 female founder unicorn.

In 2018, she received the Technology Entrepreneurship Abie Award at the Grace Hopper Celebration of Women in Computing. She was also featured among "America's Top 50 Women In Tech" by Forbes.
