= Melissa McBride =

American actress

- McBride at the 2025 San Diego Comic-Con
- Born: Melissa Suzanne McBride; May 23, 1965 (age 61); Lexington, Kentucky, U.S.
- Occupation: Actress
- Years active: 1991–present

Melissa Suzanne McBride (born May 23, 1965) is an American actress. She made her acting debut in 1993, and went onto appear in Walker, Texas Ranger (1997) and Dawson's Creek (1998). In 2007, she also starred in the film The Mist (2007). Her breakout role was Carol Peletier on the AMC series The Walking Dead (2010–2022), and later the series' spinoff The Walking Dead: Daryl Dixon (2023–present). She has garnered critical acclaim and received multiple awards and nominations for her role on the show. Originally cast in a minor role, McBride's role expanded over time to a main cast member and, from 2020, she was the second billed cast member in the opening credits of the show, and one of only two cast members to appear in every season (the other being Norman Reedus).

== Early life ==
McBride was born in Lexington, Kentucky, to parents John Leslie McBride and Suzanne Lillian (née Sagley). Her father owned his own business, and her mother studied at the historic Pasadena Playhouse. She had three siblings: John Michael, Neil Allen, and Melanie Suzanne.

== Career ==
McBride began her acting career in 1991, appearing in several television commercials for clients such as Rooms To Go; she was also a spokeswoman for Ford. She made her series television debut in a 1993 episode of ABC legal drama series Matlock, and later guest-starred in several other television drama series, including In the Heat of the Night; American Gothic; Profiler; Walker, Texas Ranger; and Dawson's Creek. In the last, she played Nina – a film buff who charms Dawson after his breakup with Jen – in the Season 1 episode "Road Trip" (1998) – and in 2003 returned to the series finale playing a different character.

In the 1990s, McBride had supporting roles in several made-for-television movies, such as Her Deadly Rival (1995) opposite Annie Potts and Harry Hamlin, Close to Danger (1997) with Rob Estes, Any Place But Home (1997), and Pirates of Silicon Valley (1999). In 1996, she appeared on the CBS miniseries A Season in Purgatory, based on Dominick Dunne's eponymous 1993 novel. From 2000 to 2010, she worked as a film and commercial casting director in Atlanta, Georgia and starred in several short films. In 2007, director Frank Darabont cast McBride as the "woman with the kids at home" in the ensemble-cast science-fiction horror film The Mist, alongside Thomas Jane, Laurie Holden, and Marcia Gay Harden. McBride was in contention for a bigger role in the film but did not want to take a significant amount of time away from her job as a casting director. The following year, she appeared in the Lifetime television movie Living Proof.

In 1996, McBride acted alongside both Martin Sheen and Ramon Estevez in the music video for country music group Diamond Rio's single It's All In Your Head.

=== The Walking Dead ===
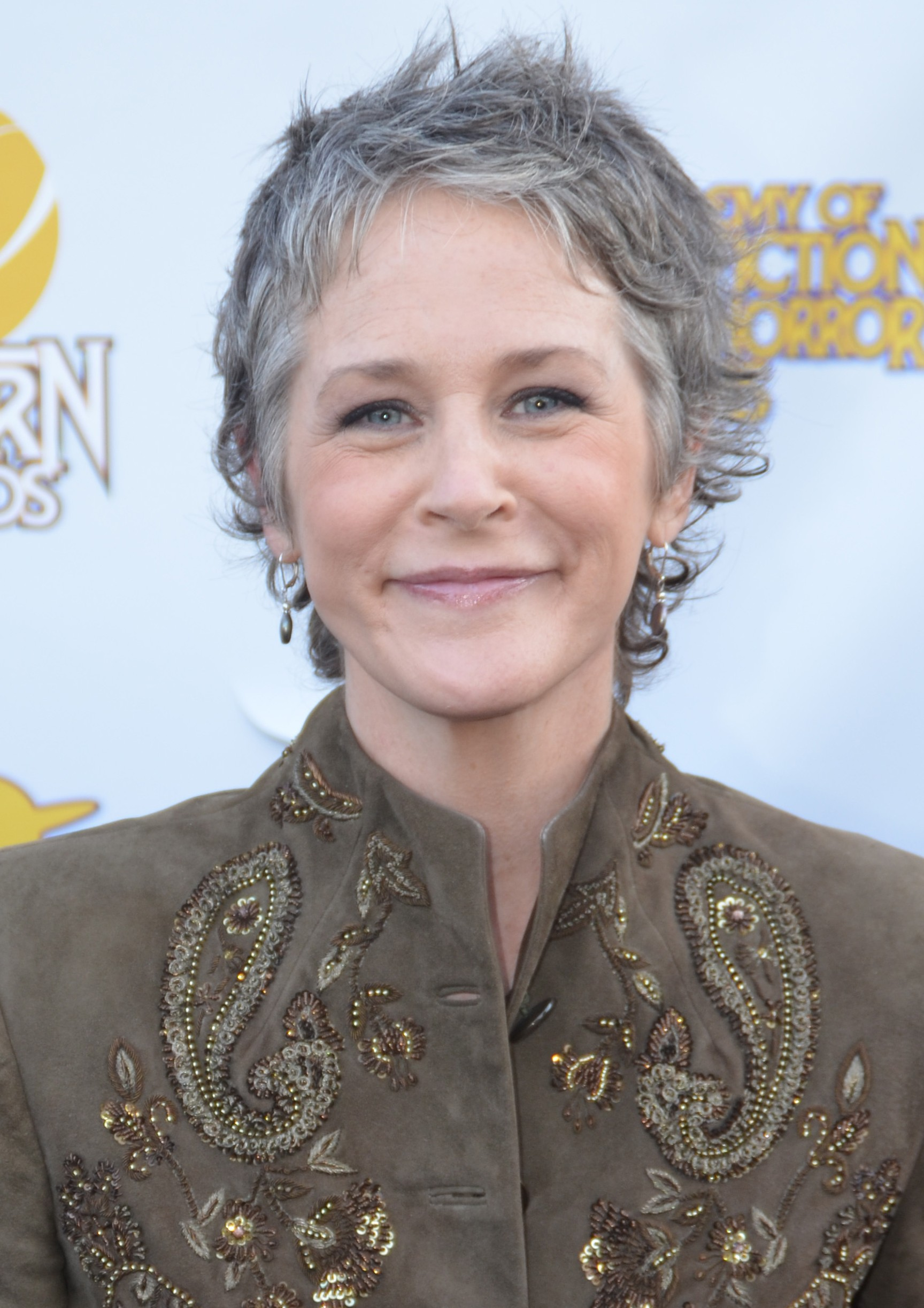
McBride at the Saturn Awards in 2014

McBride was cast as Carol Peletier in the AMC television drama series The Walking Dead – her biggest role to date. Peletier begins as a mid-forties abused wife and caring mother to preteen Sophia, fighting to survive in a violent post-apocalyptic world populated with flesh-eating zombies and the few surviving humans, some of whom are diabolical and even more dangerous than the zombies themselves. McBride did not audition for the role, which she thought was temporary. She was a recurring cast member in Season 1 and was promoted to series regular for Season 2. McBride's name appeared in the opening credits sequence beginning with the first episode of Season 4. Carol was supposed to have been killed off in the episode "Killer Within", but the producers eventually had a change of plans.

As the series progresses, McBride's character develops from being weak and dependent, into a strong, cunning, and loyal warrior. The direction of her character is contrasted between the two media. In the comic series, Carol is much younger and exhibits a neurotic, self-centered, and naive demeanor. Throughout her time in the comics, she grows increasingly unstable to the point of being self-destructive. The television show differs in these regards, as she is shown to be a stern, pragmatic, and compassionate individual who has been gradually building inner strength. Producers of the series, Scott M. Gimple and Robert Kirkman, said in 2014 that "Carol is her own unique character; it would be a disservice to Melissa McBride to say she's evolved into the Carol from the comics. The Carol in the TV show is a wholly original creation that we'll continue to explore on the show to great effect. Everyone in the writers' room loves that character, and we're thrilled with what Melissa has brought to the table. She has definitely become a character that is one to watch, and there's some really exciting stuff ahead for her."

McBride has received critical acclaim for her performance as Carol and won positive reviews from critics during Seasons 3, 4, and 5. Many critics praised McBride's performance in the Season 4 episode centered on her character, "The Grove". Others singled out Carol's actions in the Season 5 premiere, "No Sanctuary", which earned critical praise and positive fan reception. Despite the praise of some critics and a fan campaign, McBride did not receive a nomination for the 2014 Primetime Emmy Award for Outstanding Supporting Actress in a Drama Series. However, she won the 40th Annual Saturn Award for Best Supporting Actress on Television, and was nominated for the 2014 Critics' Choice Television Award for Best Supporting Actress in a Drama Series for her performance in Season 4. In March 2015, McBride was nominated for a Fangoria Chainsaw Award for Best Leading Actress in a Television series, for her role as Carol. She once again won the Saturn Award for Best Supporting Actress on Television at the 41st Saturn Awards, for the second year in a row.

McBride was set to reprise her role as Carol in a spin-off series centered on her and Daryl Dixon (played by Norman Reedus), following the conclusion of the 11th and final season of The Walking Dead, which was set to debut in 2023. In April 2022, it was reported that McBride dropped out of the series which was relocated to Europe, with AMC citing that McBride's decision to drop out was because it was "logistically untenable" for her to film in Europe. Despite this, she eventually returned to her roles as Carol as a special guest star for the final two episodes of The Walking Dead: Daryl Dixon season 1. In season 2, she returned to the show in a lead role and as executive producer; the show was also re-titled The Walking Dead: Daryl Dixon - The Book of Carol for that season.

== Personal life ==
McBride relocated to Atlanta in the mid-1980s.

== Filmography ==
=== Film ===
Year	Title	Role	Notes	Ref.
1994	Mutant Species	Tiffany's Mom		
2002	The Dangerous Lives of Altar Boys	Mrs. Doyle		
2006	Nailed!	Various roles	Short film (credited as Melissa Suzanne McBride)	
2007	The Promise	Stacey Johnson	Short film (credited as Melissa Suzanne McBride)	
2007	The Mist	Woman with Kids at Home		
2007	Lost Crossing	Sheila	Short film	
2008	Delgo	Miss Sutley / Elder Pearo	Voice role	
2014	The Reconstruction of William Zero	Dr. Ashley Bronson		
2016	The Happys	Krista		

=== Television ===
Year	Title	Role	Notes	Ref.
1993	Matlock	Darlene Kellogg	Episode: "Matlock's Bad, Bad, Bad Dream"	
1994	In the Heat of the Night	WPMM Reporter	Episodes: "Give Me Your Life: Parts 1 & 2"	
1995	American Gothic	Holly Gallagher	Episode: "Dead to the World"	
1995	Her Deadly Rival	Ellie	Television film (credited as Melissa Suzanne McBride)	
1996	Profiler	Walker Young	Episode: "Insight"	
1996	A Season in Purgatory	Mary Pat Bradley	Miniseries; 2 episodes (credited as Melissa Suzanne McBride)	
1997	Walker, Texas Ranger	Dr. Rachel Woods	Episodes: "Lucas: Parts 1 & 2"	
1997	Close to Danger	Natalie	Television film (credited as Melissa Suzanne McBride)	
1997	Any Place But Home	Brett	Television film (credited as Melissa Suzanne McBride)	
1998, 2003	Dawson's Creek	Nina	Episode: "Road Trip"	
1998, 2003	Dawson's Creek	Melanie	Episode: "All Good Things..."	
1999	Nathan Dixon	Janine Keach	Unsold television pilot (credited as Melissa Suzanne McBride)	
1999	Pirates of Silicon Valley	Elizabeth Holmes	Television film	
2008	Living Proof	Sally	Television film	
2010–2022	The Walking Dead	Carol Peletier	Recurring role (season 1), also starring (seasons 2–3), main role (season 4–11); 125 episodes	
2013	Conan	Carol Peletier	Episode: "It's not the Hotlanta, It's the Humidylanta"	
2017	Robot Chicken	Carol Peletier	Voice role; Episode: "The Robot Chicken Walking Dead Special: Look Who's Walking"	
2018	Fear the Walking Dead	Carol Peletier	Episode: "What's Your Story?"	
2019	Ride with Norman Reedus	Herself	Episode: "Scotland With Melissa McBride"	
2021	The Walking Dead: Origins	Herself	Episode: "Carol's Story"	
2023–present	The Walking Dead: Daryl Dixon	Carol Peletier	Special guest star (season 1), lead role and executive producer (season 2–present); 15 episodes	

=== Video games ===
Year	Title	Role	Notes	Ref.
2015	The Walking Dead: No Man's Land	Carol Peletier	Likeness	
2020	The Walking Dead: Onslaught	Carol Peletier	Voice and likeness	

=== Casting director ===
- The Last Adam (2006)
- The Promise (2007)
- Golden Minutes (2009)
- This Side Up (2009)
- The Party (2010)
- Broken Moment (2010)

== Awards and nominations ==
Year	Award	Category	Work	Result	Ref
2012	Satellite Awards	Best Cast – Television Series	The Walking Dead	Won	
2013	Shorty Awards	Best of Social Media	Herself	Nominated	
2014	Critics' Choice Television Award	Online Love Award	Herself	Won	
2014	Critics' Choice Television Award	Best Supporting Actress in a Drama	The Walking Dead	Nominated	
2014	Saturn Awards	Best Supporting Actress on Television	The Walking Dead	Won	
2014	EWwy Awards	Best Supporting Actress in a Drama	The Walking Dead	Nominated	
2014	IGN Awards	Best TV Hero	The Walking Dead	Nominated	
2015	Saturn Awards	Best Supporting Actress on Television	The Walking Dead	Won	
2015	Fangoria Chainsaw Awards	Best TV Supporting Actress	The Walking Dead	Nominated	
2015	EWwy Awards	Best Supporting Actress in a Drama	The Walking Dead	Won	
2016	Saturn Awards	Best Supporting Actress on Television	The Walking Dead	Nominated	
2016	Poppy Awards	Best Supporting Actress in a Drama	The Walking Dead	Nominated	
2017	Saturn Awards	Best Supporting Actress on a Television Series	The Walking Dead	Nominated	
2018	Saturn Awards	Best Supporting Actress on a Television Series	The Walking Dead	Nominated	
2019	Saturn Awards	Best Supporting Actress on a Television Series	The Walking Dead	Nominated	
2021	Saturn Awards	Best Supporting Actress on a Television Series	The Walking Dead	Nominated	
2022	Saturn Awards	Best Supporting Actress in a Network or Cable Television Series	The Walking Dead	Nominated	
2025	Saturn Awards	Best Actress in a Television Series	The Walking Dead: Daryl Dixon	Nominated	
