= Kevin Chou =

American game developer

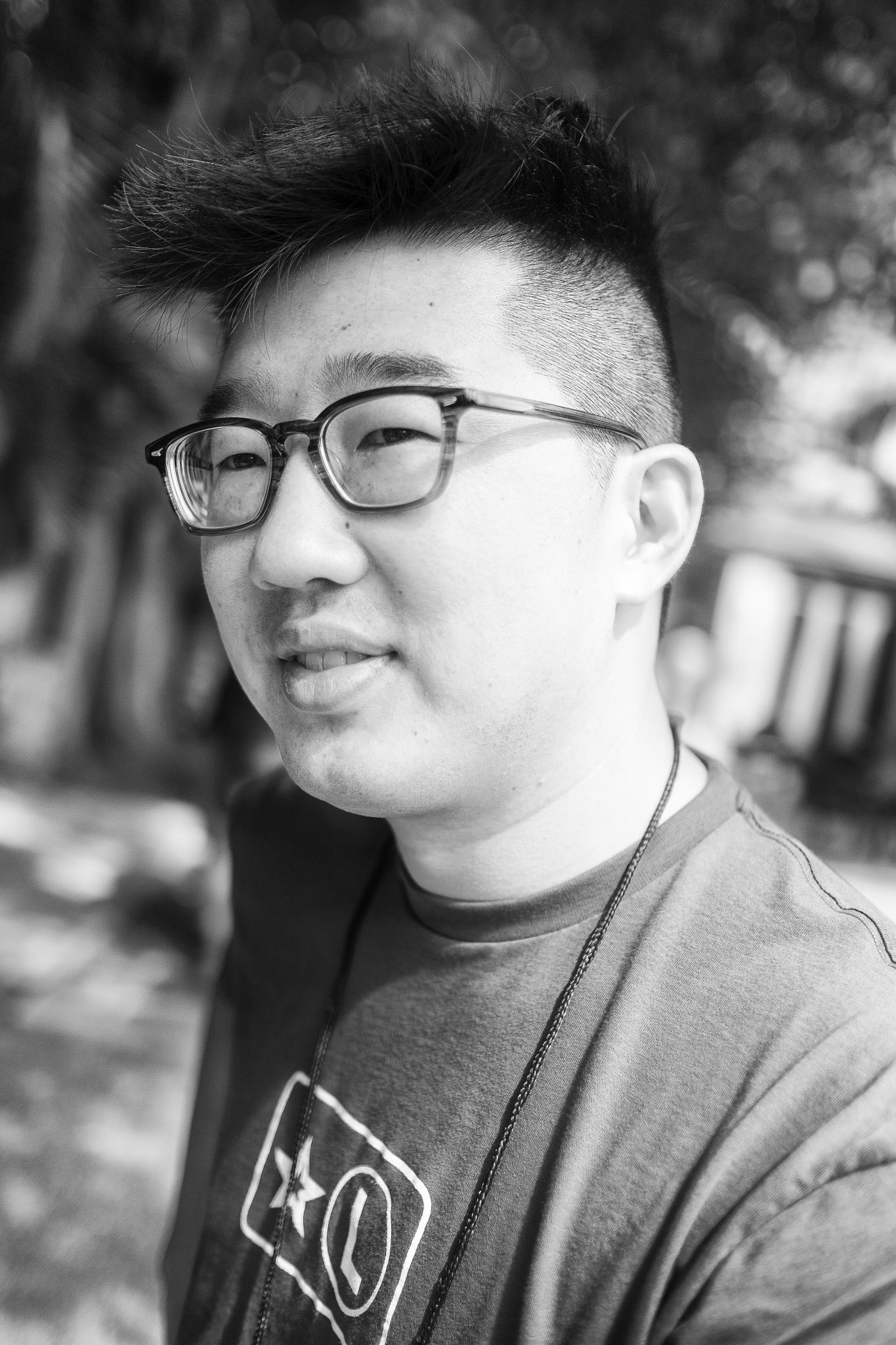
- Kevin Chou in 2014

Kevin Chou is an American video game developer and entrepreneur, best known as the co-founder and CEO of the Canadian videogame development company Kabam. Chou is also a co-owner of Gen.G Esports, which owned the now defunct Overwatch League team Seoul Dynasty.

== Life ==
Chou was raised in a family of Taiwanese immigrants in Moorpark, CA, a suburb of Los Angeles. Chou studied at UC Berkeley, graduating summa cum laude in 2002, and started his career on Wall Street, where he joined Deutsche Bank to advise publicly listed technology companies on M&A and finance. After the Dot-com Bubble ended, Chou was laid off from his investment banking job, and later obtained work at venture capital firm Canaan Partners.

In 2006, Chou and three co-founders established Watercooler, Inc., aiming to build a social network for sports, television, and film fans—a venture that eventually evolved into a platform for fantasy sports. When the company failed to gain significant attention, Chou pivoted the business from fantasy sports to Facebook games, releasing the game Kingdoms of Camelot in 2009. In 2010, the company was renamed Kabam. In 2017, Kabam was split and sold to Netmarble and FoxNext for US$800 to US$900 million
