= Spry Fox =

American video game developer

- Type: Private
- Industry: Video games
- Founded: 2010; 16 years ago in Seattle, Washington, United States
- Founders: David Edery; Daniel Cook
- Headquarters: Kirkland, Washington, United States
- Products: Triple Town; Steambirds; Road Not Taken; Realm of the Mad God; Leap Day; Bushido Bear; Alphabear; Cozy Grove
- Parent: Netflix, Inc. (2022–2025)
- Website: spryfox.com

Spry Fox is a video game producing company headquartered in Seattle, United States, that was founded in 2010 by David Edery and Daniel Cook. The company produced the games Triple Town, a freemium strategy puzzle video game with city-building game elements for social networks and mobile devices; Steambirds, a strategy flying game for mobile devices; and Road Not Taken, a roguelike puzzle video game; it also co-created Realm of the Mad God with Wild Shadow Studios. When Wild Shadow Studios was acquired by Kabam in June 2012, Spry Fox sold its stake in the game to Kabam as part of the deal.

== History ==
In July 2015, Spry Fox released Alphabear, a Scrabble-style word game with collectable bear power-ups, also for mobile devices. Alphabear received the award for Standout Indie app at the inaugural Google Play Awards in 2016.

In May 2016, Spry Fox released Bushido Bear, an action game they described as a mashup between Fruit Ninja and Smash TV, featuring similar collectable bears as Alphabear, also for mobile devices.

In September 2018, Spry Fox released Alphabear 2, a sequel to the original word game, featuring a full campaign / narrative unlike the original version of the game, among other changes. Alphabear 2 was co-funded by the US Department of Education and featured original English learning elements.

In March 2021, Spry Fox released Cozy Grove, a life-sim compared with Animal Crossing for iOS devices, PCs and consoles.

Spry Fox was acquired by Netflix, Inc. in October 2022. Netflix sold Spry Fox back to its founders in December 2025. The studio had been developing a massively multiplayer online game called Spirit Crossing for Netflix.

== See also ==
- Spry Fox, LLC v. Lolapps, Inc.
