= Alphabear =

2015 video game

- Deluxe "Hardcover Edition" cover
- Developer: Spry Fox
- Publisher: Spry Fox
- Platforms: Android, iOS, macOS, Windows
- Release: Android, iOS; 8 July 2015; macOS, Windows; 23 August 2017
- Genre: Word
- Mode: Single-player

Alphabear is a 2015 word game developed by the independent video game company Spry Fox. Released in July 2015, it draws on creative elements of one of their older releases, the 2010 game Panda Poet. A sequel, Alphabear 2, was released in 2018. Alphabear was removed from the stores in 2019.

== Gameplay ==
The premise of the game is making words from random letters on a grid for points, and scoring as many points as possible. Using tiles unlocks other tiles adjacent to them, however tiles not used for a number of turns decay into unusable stone blocks. Scoring well in levels unlocks progressively more valuable cube-shaped bears and further levels. Playing a round requires the use of a game currency called 'honey', which accrues slowly at a certain rate, limiting the number of games that can be played successively. A payment of US$4.99 unlocks unlimited 'honey'. A player can select up to three bears to help them get more points in a game. The more powerful bears 'nap' for up to several hours after use in a game. These bears can give bonuses for using individual letters or overall score bonuses. The individual puzzles are in regular or timed mode.

== Reception ==
Reception

Aggregate score
Aggregator	Score
Metacritic	(iOS) 81/100

Review score
Publication	Score
TouchArcade	(iOS) 4/5

Evan Killham of GamesBeat gave the game a score of 85 out of 100, citing many positives but conceding the requirement for the game to be continually connected to the internet a problem.

A feature of the game that became a fad on Twitter was capturing screenshots of the bears incorporating words that had been entered by the player in random sentences.

Alphabear received the award for Standout Indie app at the inaugural Google Play Awards in 2016.
