= Global Warfare =

2011 video game

- Release: May 3, 2011
- Genre: Strategy

Global Warfare was a social strategy game produced by Kabam Inc. It is no longer available to play.

== History ==
The game was open for beta on March 18, 2011 and was released on May 3, 2011 for social networking sites Google+ and Facebook. On November 1, 2012 it was announced the game was shutting down on November 30.

== Gameplay ==
Global Warfare is set in a near-future world of warring city-states. As a General, players are in charge of their own city-state and army and can establish alliances to assist in rebuilding their cities and battling for global domination. As each city has been destroyed by war, the player has six days to rebuild the city's defences, research upgrades and enable the production of advanced armies. A seven-day grace period is given when players start a new game, used to prepare for war and establish alliances. Once the grace period is over, the player's city becomes a potential target for attack, but the player can launch attacks of their own.

The game places emphasis on building alliances with other players. Those who fail to form alliances are vulnerable to massed attack from multiple rival players. Alliances can attempt to capture resources as a group or send reinforcements should one of their number come under attack from a rival.

== Reception ==
Nicole Tanner of IGN notes that Kabam's experience with their previous titles allowed them to "perfect the formula". However, she points out the lack of a story and the similarities with the developers' previous titles. Jeremiah Leif Johnson of Gamezebo also points out that while the game is good, it is similar to the previous titles. Both Tanner and Johnson criticize the strategy aspect for the lack of low-level unit control.
