= Kabam =

Canadian video game developer

Kabam Inc.
- Company type: Private
- Founded: 2006
- Headquarters: Vancouver, British Columbia, Canada
- Key people: Simon Sim (CEO); Seungwon Lee (CEO January 2021-February 2025); Tim Fields (CEO March 2017-January 2021); Kevin Chou (co-founder); Holly Liu (co-founder); Michael Li (co-founder); Wayne Chan (co-founder)
- Industry: Video game
- Revenue: ▲360 million
- Employees: 700 (March 7, 2017)
- Parent: Netmarble
- Subsidiaries: Kabam Games, Inc. Kabam Games UK LTD. Kabam Acadia Inc. Kabam Montreal, Inc. Kabam Software Inc. Kabam LA, Inc; Kung Fu Factory
- Website: Official website

Kabam (formerly Watercooler, Inc.) is a Canadian video game developer and publisher founded in 2006 and headquartered in Vancouver, with offices in Montreal and Los Angeles. The company develops and publishes massively multiplayer social games such as Marvel Contest of Champions and Transformers: Forged to Fight for mobile devices. Before expanding into gaming, Kabam established itself as a social applications developer with focusing on entertainment and sports.

The company has focused on developing "real games," or games with immersive gameplay mechanics akin to more traditional MMOs with an emphasis on the spending and gambling of virtual currency. In late 2009, Kabam launched Kingdoms of Camelot, one of the first successful strategy games on Facebook, but in June 2010, the number of players began constantly shrinking. In April 2015, Kabam announced a shift in its focus to developing AAA mobile games.

== History ==
Kabam was founded in 2006 as Watercooler by Kevin Chou, Michael Li, Holly Liu, and Wayne Chan, the company started off focused on building community apps for sports and entertainment fans, amassing more than 25 million users on Facebook and other social networks. In October 2009 Watercooler, secured $5.5 million in Series B funding from Betfair, the world's largest Internet betting exchange, and Canaan Partners, which participated in the company's Series A funding in 2007. On November 2, 2009, Watercooler, launched Kingdoms of Camelot on Facebook.

On August 3, 2010, Watercooler changed its name to Kabam.

On September 19, 2012, CEO Kevin Chou announced that Kabam was considering an IPO. A secondary stock sale was agreed at the end of 2013 which valued the company at $700 million, it was also announced at this time that four of its games – led by Kingdoms of Camelot – grossed more than $100 million, with $360 million in revenues for 2013.

In June 2014, Kabam hired former EA Mobile VP Aaron Loeb as Senior Vice President of its North American Studios (San Francisco and Vancouver). While at EA Mobile, he worked on The Simpsons: Tapped Out and Monopoly Slots. Kabam hoped he would provide a link to Hollywood studios. Also in June, Kabam shut down servers for The Hobbit: Armies of the Third Age.

Alibaba announced in July 2014 that it planned to invest $120 million in Kabam, giving the company a $1 billion valuation. This allowed its games to be distributed through Alibaba's apps, including Mobile Taobao and the Laiwang messaging app.

In April 2015, Kabam switched its focus to developing AAA mobile games. As a result, several Kabam games were shut down, older Kabam games transferred to other companies and Kabam support for third-party games decreased.

On August 13, 2015, Machine Zone, maker of Game of War: Fire Age, sued Kabam for trade secret theft. The conflict was resolved to both companies' satisfaction on September 10.

On September 10, 2015, Kabam, Disney Interactive, and Lucasfilm released Star Wars: Uprising. In September 2015, Nick Earl, president of worldwide studios, resigned. Mike Verdu was promoted to president of Kabam Studios and chief creative officer in charge of the publisher's game design and game quality. Aaron Loeb was promoted to president of Kabam Studios and live services, in charge of service quality.

On January 7, 2016, Kabam announced it had sold its legacy games and third-party-published games to Chinese publisher GAEA Mobile. After the downsizing in April 2015, Kabam shut down several older games that were not transferred.

On February 22, 2016, Kabam laid off 8 percent of its company workforce. Kevin Chou, Kabam's chief executive, said in an interview with GamesBeat that the company would focus on free-to-play massively multiplayer mobile games such as its then-current hits, Marvel Contest of Champions and Star Wars: Uprising, putting less emphasis on single-player games such as Fast & Furious. On June 23, 2016, Kabam announced that it would be selling Realm of the Mad God to DECA Games.

In July 2016, Kabam announced that Marvel Contest of Champions hit $100 million in gross revenue in seven months, the fastest of any game in the company's history (The Hobbit was next fastest at 13 months). In November 2016, Kabam appointed Jeff Howell to the newly created position of Chief Technology Officer.

In August 2016, Kabam partnered with Hasbro to develop Transformers: Forged to Fight. The title was released on April 5, 2017. The game was shut down in January 2023 but was remade available to Netflix members in May 2023.

As of March 1, 2017, Kabam was acquired by Netmarble. At this time, Tim Fields took over as CEO.

On August 17, 2020, Kabam released Marvel Realm of Champions, a spin-off of Marvel Contest of Champions. That game would go on to shut down on March 31, 2022.

On January 17, 2022, Kabam announced that Seungwon Lee from Netmarble would assume the role of CEO at Kabam. The company later released Disney Mirrorverse, a Disney crossover mobile role-playing game, on June 23, 2022.

== Company acquisitions ==
Date of Purchase	Name of Company	Key Targets	References
October 22, 2010	WonderHill	Dragons of Atlantis & Aquarium Life	
December 20, 2011	Gravity Bear	Battle Punks	
June 19, 2012	Wild Shadow Studios	Realm of the Mad God	
January 27, 2012	Fearless Studios	Haden Blackman – creator of Star Wars:The Force Unleashed & Cedrick Collomb – formerly Director of Engineering at LucasArts	
December 3, 2013	Balanced Worlds	Bomb Buddies	
January 15, 2013	Exploding Barrel Games	Margaritaville	
March 10, 2014	Phoenix Age	Underworld Empire and Castle Age	
January 12, 2015	Tapzen	Mike Verdu – formerly worked on the Command & Conquer franchise at EA, also used to work for Zynga	
January 12, 2015	Magic Pixel Games	Michael Seegers – former EA games developer	
May 26, 2016	Superweapon	Dawn of Steel	
March 25, 2019	Riposte Games & Co	Mini Guns publishing	

== Games and platforms ==
=== Games developed or acquired by Kabam ===
	Title	Platform	Original Developer	Available to Play	Release date	Shutdown Date	Notes
1.	Fantasy Football	Facebook	Watercooler	No	2009/07/01	2010/10	
2.	$20K Football Challenge	Facebook	Watercooler	No	2009/08	2010/10	
3.	2010 Bracket Challenge	Facebook	Watercooler	No	2009/10/01	2010/10	
4.	Kingdoms of Camelot	Facebook	Watercooler	Yes	2009/11/06		Transferred to RockYou and supported by RockYou as of the beginning of April 2015, though Kabam still hosts the game and Kabam Rewards still apply to the game.
5.	Noodle	Facebook	Watercooler	No	2009/11/12	2010/10	
6.	Sweet World	Facebook	Watercooler	No	2010/04/28	2011/01/31	
7.	Epic Goal	Facebook	Watercooler	No	2010/06/01	2010/11	
8.	SI Fantasy Football	Facebook, Web	Kabam	No	2010/08/06	2011/04	
9.	GreenSpot	MySpace	WonderHill	No	2009	2010/12/02	
10.	Dog World	MySpace, Facebook	WonderHill	No	2009	2010	
11.	Enchanted Gardens	Facebook	WonderHill	No	2009/10/12	2010	
12.	Furry Farm	Facebook	WonderHill	No	2010/03/19	2010/12/01	
13.	Tattoo City	Facebook	WonderHill	No	2010/06/16	2010/12/01	
14.	Dragons of Atlantis		WonderHill	Yes	2010/10/06		Transferred to RockYou and supported by RockYou as of the beginning of April 2015, though Kabam still hosts the game and Kabam Rewards still apply to the game.
15.	Battle Punks	Facebook	Gravity Bear Studio	No	2010/03/02	2012/03	Date is for beta release, server unresponsiveness by March 2012 was not announced and remains unresolved
16.	Realm of the Mad God	Web, Kongregate, Steam	Wild Shadow Studios, Spry Fox	Yes	2010/01/10	2016/06/16	Acquired by Deca Games on 19 June and officially transferred to Deca Games on 23 June.
17.	Bomb Buddies	Facebook	Balanced Worlds Studio	No	2012/05/25	2013/06	Server unresponsiveness by June 2013 was not announced and remains unresolved
18.	Castle Age	Facebook	Phoenix Age	Yes	2009/02		
19.	Castle Age HD	iOS	Phoenix Age	Yes	2011/12/15		
20.	Underworld Empire	iOS & Android	Phoenix Age	Yes	2013/01/15		
21.	DDTank2	Web	7Road	No	2013/05/02	2015/03/05	
22.	This Means War	iOS & Android	Magic Pixel Games, TapZen	Yes	2014/06/26		
23.	Hero Force	Facebook	Kabam	No	2010/08/01	2011/04/29	
24.	Glory of Rome	Facebook	Kabam	Yes	2010/10/23		Transferred to RockYou and supported by RockYou as of the beginning of April 2015, though Kabam still hosts the game and Kabam Rewards still apply to the game.
25.	Global Warfare	Facebook, Web	Kabam	No	2011/03/18	2012/11/30	
26.	Samurai Dynasty	Facebook	Kabam	No	2011/03/29	2011/11/15	Date is for beta release
27.	Edgeworld	Facebook	Kabam	No	2011/05/18	2018/10	Transferred to RockYou and supported by RockYou as of the beginning of April 2015, though Kabam still hosts the game and Kabam Rewards still apply to the game.
28.	The Godfather: Five Families	Facebook, Kongregate, Web	Kabam	No	2011/09/07	2019/02	Date is for beta release. Transferred to RockYou and supported by RockYou as of the beginning of April 2015, though Kabam still hosts the game and Kabam Rewards still apply to the game.
29.	Kingdoms of Camelot: Battle for the North	iOS & Android	Kabam	Yes	2011/11/21		
30.	Thirst of Night	Web	Kabam	No	2011/12	2013/01/31	
31.	Final Eden	Web	Kabam	No	2012/01/27	2012/11/27	
32.	Mobile Command: Crisis in Europe	iOS	Kabam	No	2012/04/04	2012/10/08	Date for beta release, limited to Canada
33.	Arcane Empires	iOS, Android & Facebook	Kabam	Yes	2012/06/26		Date is for beta release, limited to Canada
34.	Legend Four	iOS	Kabam	No	2012/07/21	2013	
35.	Trojan War	Web	Kabam	No	2012/09/03	2012/11/19	
36.	Battle Shard	Web	Kabam	No	2012/09/12	2012/12/04	Date is for beta release
37.	Kabam Slots	iOS & Android	Kabam	No	2012/09/20	2014	
38.	The Hobbit: Kingdoms of Middle Earth	iOS & Android	Kabam	Yes	2012/10/16		
39.	The Hobbit: Armies of the Third Age	Facebook, Web	Kabam	No	2012/11/06	2014/06/20	
40.	Edgeworld Mobile	iOS	Kabam	No	2012/11/06	2013/06/24	Date is for beta release, limited to Canada
41.	Legend Four HD	iOS	Kabam	No	2012/12/10	2013	
42.	Lich Defense	Android	Kabam	No	2013/02/01	2013	
43.	Blastron	iOS, Android & Facebook	Kabam	No	2013/01/03	2014	
44.	Farland Wars	Android	Kabam	No	2013/03/06	2013	
45.	Dark District	iOS	Kabam	No	2013/03/29	2014/07/21	Date for beta release, limited to Canada
46.	Battle Dodgers	iOS, Android	Kabam	Yes	2013/04/06		Published and supported by Galaxy Pest Control. Android version is no longer available.
47.	Dragons of Atlantis: Heirs of the Dragon	iOS & Android	Kabam	Yes	2013/04/16		Date is for beta release
48.	Fast & Furious 6	iOS, Android & Facebook	Exploding Barrel Games	Yes (released private server mod)	2013/05/15	2015/06/30	
49.	Imperium: Galactic War	Facebook, Web	Kabam	No	2013/05/22	2013/11/04	
50.	Order of Elements	iOS	Kabam	No	2013/05/31	2013/11/11	
51.	Galactic War: Legacy	Android	Kabam	No	2013/06/12	2013/07	Loading issues occurred by July 2013
52.	Heroes of Camelot	iOS & Android	Kabam	Yes	2013/06/27		Date for beta release
53.	Runes of War	iOS & Android	Kabam	Yes	2013/08/26		Date is for beta release
54.	Eternal Uprising: End of Days	iOS & Android	Kabam	No	2013/09/23	2014	
55.	Blast Zone!	iOS	Kabam	No	2013/10/08	2014/08/28	Date is for beta release
56.	Blood Crown	Web	Kabam	No	2013/12	2014/08/05	
57.	Wartune: Hall of Heroes	iOS & Android	Kabam	Yes	2014/03/06		
58.	Angel Alliance	Web	Kabam	Yes	2014/03/11		Date is for beta release
59.	Ravenmarch: Empire in Flames	Facebook	Kabam	No	2014/04/04	2016/02/16	Then supported by 37GAMES by June 1, 2015, but game suffers from long periods of broken Facebook login
60.	Spirit Lords (Spirit Storm)	iOS & Android	Kabam	Yes	2014/05/07		
61.	Divine Might	iOS & Android	Kabam	Yes	2014/05/09		Date for beta release
62.	Blades of Excalibur	Facebook & Web	Kabam	No	2014/06/04	2015/04	
63.	The Lord of the Rings: Legends of Middle-earth	iOS & Android	Kabam	Yes	2014/09/18		Date for beta release
64.	Metal Skies	iOS & Android	Kabam	No	2014/08/05	2015/03/06	Date for beta release
65.	Marvel: Contest of Champions	iOS & Android	Kabam	Yes	2014/10/02		Date for beta release
66.	The Hunger Games: Panem Rising	iOS & Android	Kabam	No	2014/10/10	2016/03/10	Date is for beta release
67.	Creature Academy	iOS & Android	Kabam	No	2014/10/29	2015/04/10	Date for beta release
68.	Fast & Furious: Legacy	iOS & Android	Kabam	No (no any server fixes yet)	2015/01/23	2017/01/19	Date for beta release
69.	Star Wars: Uprising	iOS & Android	Kabam	No	2015/07/08	2016/11/17	Date for beta release / Date for planned server shutdown
70.	Marvel United	iOS & Android	Kabam	No	2015/07/09	2016/01/03	Date for beta release, Android beta only available in Denmark and Sweden
71.	Transformers: Forged to Fight	iOS & Android	Kabam	Yes	2016/12/05	2023/01/13	Date is for beta release. After its initial shutdown, the game was again made available to Netflix members as of 2023/05/10
72.	Shop Titans	iOS & Android & Steam & Epic Games	Kabam	Yes	2019/03/04		
73.	Marvel Realm of Champions	iOS & Android	Kabam	No	2020/08/17	2022/03/21	Date is for beta release
74.	Disney Mirrorverse	iOS & Android	Kabam	No	2022/06/23	2024/12/16	
75.	King Arthur: Legends Rise	iOS & Android	Kabam	Yes	2023/12/05		

=== Games developed by 3rd parties and distributed by Kabam ===
	Title	Platform	Original Developer	Available to Play	Release date	Shutdown Date	Notes
01.	Ministry of War	Kongregate, Web	SnailGames	Yes	2010/08	2014/02/28	
02.	Geomon	iOS	EsperCorp, Loki Studios	No	2010/10/01	2013/04/17	
03.	Nadirim	Web	Digital Reality, Twisted Tribe Ltd.	No	2010/12/08	2013/06/30	Date is for beta release
04.	Dungeon Overlord	Facebook, Kongregate, Web	Nightowl Games	Yes	2011	2014/02/28	
05.	Shadowland Online	Web	ZQGame	Yes	2011/08/08	2016/02/16	Date is for beta release
06.	Castlot	Web	Power Hosts Technology	Yes	2011/09	2016/01/27	Date is for beta release
07.	Book of Heroes	iOS & Android	Venan Games	Yes	2011/12/01		
08.	Clash of the Dragons	Kongregate, Web	5th Planet Games	No	2011/12	2014/10/30	
09.	BloodRealm	Kongregate, Facebook, Steam, iOS, Android & Web	RedPoint Labs & Making Fun, Inc.	Yes	2012/04	2014/09/11	Date is for beta release
10.	Rise of the Warriors	iOS	The Monkey Twins Studios	Yes	2012/06/28	2013	
11.	Age of Chaos	iOS	LVL6	No	2012/08/05	2013	
12.	My Singing Monsters	Android, iOS & Web	Big Blue Bubble	Yes	2012/09/04	2013/02	
13.	Wrath of Olympus	iOS	Chocobotsgames, mekalabo	No	2012/12/07	2014	
14.	Reign of Conquerors	iOS & Android	Minoraxis	Yes	2012/12/19	2014	Date is for beta release
15.	Invincible Armada	Facebook	Neowiz Games	No	2012/12/20	2014/02/28	
16.	Kings of the Realm	Web, iOS & Android	DigitGame Studios	Yes	2013/04/12	2016/01/27	Kabam published mobile versions of the game on September 2, 2014, but the different versions were never cross-platform compatible. The mobile versions stopped working by January 2015 and Kabam forum support ended on February 9, 2015.
17.	Puzzle Trooper	iOS & Android	gumi	Yes	2013/06/21	2014/04/30	Date is for beta release
18.	Moonrise	Steam, iOS	Undead Labs, Kabam	No	2014/12/03	2015/12/31	After limited releases in Canada, Denmark and Sweden, a beta was launched on Steam in early March with Early Access on May 27 before Jeff Strain, founder of Undead Labs, announced the game's closure. Android and iOS were the original planned platforms for the worldwide release, but the Android version was never released as the game closed while in beta.
19.	Slot Galaxy	Facebook	Galaxy Star Entertainment	Yes	2012/03/23	2013	
20.	Slots Tycoon	iOS	Zipline Games	Yes	2012/05/23	2013	
21.	Slot Galaxy HD Slot Machines	Android	Tap Slots	Yes	2012/12/16	2013	
22.	Texas Hold'em Poker	Web		Yes	?	2013	
23.	Galaxy Online 2	Facebook, Web	I Got Games	Yes	2010	2016/02/16	
24.	Wings of Destiny	Facebook, Web	I Got Games	Yes	2012/09/13	2016/02/16	
25.	Call of Gods	Kongregate, Web	Biyojoy Network Technology	Yes	2010	2016/02/16	
26.	Glory of Gods	Kongregate, Web	Biyojoy Network Technology	Yes	2012/12/03	2014/02/28	
27.	Pirates: Tides of Fortune	Web	Plarium	Yes	2012/01/12		
28.	Stormfall: Age of War	Facebook, Web	Plarium	Yes	2012/11/01		
29.	Crystal Saga	Kongregate, Web	Reality Squared Games	Yes	2011/08	2016/02/12	All players who filed a ticket to reality squared games got their characters transferred to r2games.com under one of their servers
30.	Yitien	Web	Reality Squared Games	Yes	2013/04/09	2016/02/12	Date is for beta release
31.	Demon Slayer (Wartune)	Facebook, Web	Reality Squared Games	Yes	2012/08/13		
32.	Wartune	Facebook, Web	Reality Squared Games	Yes	2012/08/13		Yahoo! version of the game was shut down on March 31, 2014, and progress transfer to other versions of the game was not possible.

Notes: Release date denotes when a game is first available to play, including closed and open beta releases. For games that are developed by other studios and distributed by Kabam, the shutdown date is when Kabam discontinued its support of the games. Those games may still be distributed by other publishers, or available to play on servers hosted by companies other than Kabam.
