= Realm of the Mad God =

Massively multiplayer online video game

- Title screen in August 2020
- Developers: Wild Shadow Studios; Spry Fox; Kabam; DECA Games
- Publisher: DECA Games
- Engine: Adobe Flash; Unity (remastered 2020)
- Platforms: Microsoft Windows macOS
- Release: Windows, Mac: WW: June 20, 2011
- Genres: MMORPG; Bullet hell Roguelike
- Mode: Multiplayer

Realm of the Mad God is a massively multiplayer online shoot 'em up video game created by Wild Shadow Studios and currently owned and developed by DECA Games. It was in public beta from January 2010 and the browser version launched on June 20, 2011. On February 20, 2012 the game was made available on the digital distribution platform Steam for Microsoft Windows and OS X.

The game has been described as a "massively-multiplayer cooperative bullet hell shooter" with an 8-bit pixelated art style. Players control characters who have been transported to the realm of Oryx (the titular Mad God) to become food for his many minions and abominations, which the players must dispatch. Central to the design of the game is the fact that character death is permanent. Upon death, the player's character is lost along with all of its carried equipment, although the player can store a number of items for safekeeping in a limited-capacity vault away from danger. Different character choices in class also help make the game more diverse and help to support teamwork.

The game is free-to-play with optional in-game micro-transactions. Items that can be bought with optional transactions vary from high-level equipment, pets that provide aid to the player (by attacking enemies, healing the player, etc.), increased storage space, and a variety of aesthetic features such as skins, clothes, and dyes.

Wild Shadow Studios was acquired by Kabam in June 2012 and obtained Realm of the Mad God in the acquisition. Kabam maintained the game until July 2016, when they sold it to DECA Games.

This game client was originally written in Flash and could be played in-browser on the official site, on Kongregate, or could be downloaded from Steam. Due to the discontinuation of Adobe Flash Support by 2020, it was announced on June 12, 2018, that a remastered version of the client built using the Unity game engine was under development, which was first released to the public through an Open Beta on April 15, 2020, and was officially released as Realm of the Mad God Exalt on July 22, 2020.

== Gameplay ==
Players fight a monster in game. HUD elements such as the inventory can be seen on the right-hand side.

The HUD on the right-hand side displays a mini-map of the player's current server as well as the current character's statistics and inventory. The mini-map of the realm is initially blank, but areas can be revealed as a player traverses through the map. Player and NPC chat appears in the lower left corner of the screen.

The game consists of players firing projectiles and destroying enemies to earn experience, fame, and better equipment. A character moves around using the WASD keys and uses the mouse to aim and shoot. Contrary to usual practice in MMOs, the experience for killing monsters is awarded fully to each player present, rather than divided. Because of this, it is generally advantageous for players to group up. Players are able to instantly teleport to any other player on the map under a cooldown of 10 seconds. In addition, players are able to escape to the safety of the Nexus, a safe area where characters can't be killed, at the push of a button (the default keys are R and F5).

Players begin their game sessions in the Nexus. The Nexus consists of multiple sections featuring, among other things: a marketplace, healing fountains, and portals to enter realms. The marketplace is scattered across the central Nexus and players commonly use this area to trade with other players as well as purchase items being sold in the Nexus using Realm Gold (the in-game currency that is purchasable with real money). Occasionally, packages may appear in the Nexus that can be purchased with Fame rather than Realm Gold. North of the marketplace is a large room that contains multiple portals leading to the "realms" (game map instances present on the server). Each of these realms is named after powerful monsters in the game (i.e. Medusa, Djinn, etc.). The capacity of each realm is 85 people at once, and a full realm cannot be entered until a player in it dies or leaves.

During gameplay, the player is directed to "quest" monsters which are indicated by a red marker at the edge of the game window. As their character levels up in the realm, they are guided from the "Beaches" and "Lowlands" areas at the edges of the map, through the "Midlands" and "Highlands," and to the more difficult "Mountains" (also known in-game as the "Godlands") in the center of the map. The Mountains host powerful monsters known as "Gods", which are significantly stronger than the other foes in the Realm but also provide more experience and better loot. Defeating certain quest enemies allows more powerful "event" bosses to spawn, which are unique and often once-per-realm bosses that can be killed to obtain higher-tier loot and open portals to rare dungeons.

Once all of the quest heroes and event bosses in a realm are defeated, the realm is closed and players can no longer enter the Realm from the Nexus. After a delay, players are then teleported to Oryx's Castle, a high-level dungeon where they take down his minions and make their way into the castle. After a confrontation with the castle guardians, players can face off against Oryx himself in his chamber. Oryx's Castle also contains an alternative encounter that triggers when a specific condition is met, granting the players that choose this option over Oryx to fight a special boss and access several unique boss-only dungeons.

Oryx has three, increasingly powerful forms. When Oryx's first form is defeated in his chamber, he drops a locked portal to the Wine Cellar, where his second form resides. The portal can only be unlocked if one of the players surviving the first Oryx fight happens to have an "incantation" that unlocks the Wine Cellar, which drops from various enemies throughout the game. Upon being unlocked, the players can storm the Mad God's heavily guarded Wine Cellar and face the true Oryx, who is significantly stronger than his previous incarnation and wields a completely new set of attacks.

The rewards of the Oryx boss fights are a large amount of fame and some rare and useful equipment. After Oryx's second form is defeated, players possessing three special rune items can use them to reveal the portal to Oryx's Sanctuary, the most difficult area in the game as of July 2020. In the Sanctuary, players can encounter Oryx's third and most powerful form, which drops some of the most powerful items in the game.

== Mechanics ==
=== Classes ===
Realm of the Mad God offers 19 playable classes, each with their own unique ability. These classes are: Wizard, Rogue, Archer, Priest, Warrior, Knight, Paladin, Assassin, Necromancer, Huntress, Mystic, Trickster, Sorcerer, Ninja, Samurai, Bard, Summoner, Kensei, and Druid. Each class wears one of three armor types and uses one of six weapon types. Each weapon has an alternate type which behaves differently than the base weapon, altering the play style of that class. Depending on the class or item equipped, abilities can deal damage, inflict debuffs on enemies, buff or heal allies, or otherwise perform a defensive function. Players starting off will have access to the Wizard, or both Wizard and Rogue if playing through Steam. Players unlock other classes by leveling up or reaching level 20 with previously unlocked classes.

=== Items ===
Items are generally classified into tiers, with higher-tier items having better stats. Some items are not classified by tier and are thus either given an "untiered" designation, or a "set tiered" designation if they are part of an item set. Item examples include weapons, armor, rings, abilities, limited-use items, and April Fools' Day counterparts.

=== Loot Bags ===
Almost every enemy in the game can drop loot bags, which can contain potions, items, or cosmetics. Loot bags are split into different tiers, which affect their appearance and what items they can contain. There are ten tiers of bags in the game (in order of increasing rarity): brown, pink, purple, egg baskets, cyan, blue, golden, orange, red, and white. Brown and pink bags often contain potions of health or mana as well as lower tier gear, and can be seen by everyone when dropped. Every tier of bag from purple onwards are "soulbound" and will only been seen by the player for whom it dropped. Many items, such as stat potions and most equipment, can be traded to other players, even if they were originally dropped in a soulbound bag. The rarest items tend to drop in white bags and are frequently referred to in the community as "white bag items" or "whites". Many of these white bag items can completely change the way a class is played and are highly sought after by players.

=== Dungeons ===
One major gameplay element is dungeon crawling. In realms, dungeons may drop from certain enemies or event bosses that players can enter to fight a themed boss and its minions. Most dungeons are generated with a random layout (though some dungeons do exist with a predetermined layout), so they will have a different layout with every visit. The difficulty of each dungeon is determined by a 1-10 ranking system represented by tombstones, which can be viewed by hovering the mouse on the dungeon in the hud. Dungeons with 10 tombstones are known to be the most challenging dungeons in the game, while dungeons with 2 or fewer tombstones can be completed with ease.

Most mid-to-high-level dungeons will provide the player with stat boost potions, some even guaranteeing such potions in certain conditions. The dungeon monsters also have a chance to drop equipment for the player. In addition to these drops, dungeon bosses typically provide the player with a small possibility of obtaining white bag items that cannot be found anywhere else. Some of these rare items may prove more useful to the player depending on their preferences or the type of item.

=== Stats and Potions ===
Once a character reaches level 20, players focus on obtaining potions that permanently increase the stats of the character that consumes. Players are able to work towards maxing eight stats: Dexterity, Speed, Wisdom, Vitality, Attack, Defense, Mana, and Life. When consumed, potions will increase the character's stat by one point. Stat potions can drop from gods in the godlands, from event bosses, and from dungeon bosses. The difficulty of the dungeon often corresponds with how valued the stat potions that can drop from it are; Speed, a relatively easy stat to max, is easy to obtain, while Life, the hardest stat to max, drops from the harder dungeons in the game. Harder dungeons may also drop Greater Stat Potions, which increase the stat value by two instead of one.

Every class in the game each has unique max values for each stat as well as average levels for each stat upon reaching level 20, meaning that it can take up to consuming 40 potions of a particular stat on one class, and around 10 of the same stat on another. It is common terminology in game to refer to a person who has increased all stats to their maximum value as 8/8, and conversely, a player who does not have any of their stats maxed is 0/8. The quality of the character's gravestone corresponds to the amount of stats they had maxed at the moment they had died.

=== Fame ===
Fame is a permanent-progression mechanic that players can use to spend on cosmetics or pets. Upon reaching level 20, experience gained that would be used for leveling up is instead stored and converted into fame. Experience is converted into fame at a 2000:1 ratio and is stored individually for each character a player has. Fame gain is also further increased for all fame gained before hitting the limit of 650, after which it reverts to the 2000:1 ratio. In addition to the experience conversion, players can earn fame bonuses by completing certain challenges or hitting milestones on a character while it is alive. Players can also earn bonus fame via percentage bonuses given from equipping higher-grade items. Fame is not added to a player's total balance until a character dies, at which point all fame that has been earned on that character will be added.

=== Pets ===
Occasionally, gods or dungeon bosses will drop egg baskets which contain pet eggs. Players can only hatch eggs from the Pet Yard, which is accessed through the nexus. Pets will have three abilities which are randomly chosen from a larger pool of possible abilities which the player can gradually level up to increase their usefulness. Pets can belong to one of several family types in the game, which influences which abilities pets are likely to have as well as their compatibility with other pets for fusion. There are 14 pet families in the game: Aquatic, Automaton, Avian, Canine, Exotic, Farm, Feline, Humanoid, Insect, Penguin, Reptile, Spooky, Woodland, and ???. Egg baskets can also contain mystery pet eggs (not to be confused with the ??? family), which can hatch a pet from any family.

To level up pets, players must have an item to feed their pet, as well as sufficient fame. All items in the game have a certain amount of feed power, dubbed "FP", which denotes how much experience a pet will gain if it is fed the item and can be viewed in the item's description. Feeding pets becomes increasingly costly as a pets rarity increases, so it is therefore beneficial to prioritize items with high feed power to feed to pets, granting the most experience possible.

Pets are also categorized by rarity with there being five rarities: Common, Uncommon, Rare, Legendary, and Divine. Egg baskets can contain eggs up to legendary rarity, but it is exceedingly rare and will most often drop common eggs. Players can upgrade their pets to the next rarity by fusing two pets of the same rarity to produce one pet of the next rarity stage. To fuse pets, players must have sufficient fame as well as a pet yard that is upgraded to store pets of a desired rarity, which is also purchased with fame. Pets of higher rarity will have more abilities as well as a higher level cap for their abilities.

=== Guilds ===
The game features guilds that each allows for a maximum of 50 players and 5 ranks. Players in guilds can chat with each other privately in a designated guild chat, which players outside the guild cannot see. A guild costs the founding player 1000 fame to name and create and has a guild hall that can be accessed by members of the guild through the nexus. Upon a member's death, guild fame is earned proportionally to the amount of fame that the player earned. Guilds can buy upgrades such as larger guild halls and cosmetic features with the guild fame. The guild also allows players to type "pots" or "hp" allowing a chest to appear that can be broken and gives out both health and magic potions with a small cooldown between attempts.

== Development ==
The game was originally created by Alex Carobus and Rob Shillingsburg, founders of Wild Shadow Studios, for indie game forum TIGSource's "Assemblee Competition" in October 2009, which limited the competitors to a very small sample of art resources. The developers described the aim of the game was to "shake things up by breaking as many MMO 'rules' as we could" It was noticed and received a good response from players, prompting the developers to work on a full game. The game was finally launched in a beta stage on January 10, 2010.

Following the initial launch, Spry Fox joined the development team, helping bring the game to a full release out of beta on June 20, 2011.

To help fund the game's development, optional microtransactions were added to the game, drawing a mixed response from players. The developers defended the microtransactions, saying "they seemed like the most convenient, customer-friendly way to pay for the game... those that passionately love the game, can spend as much as they want, helping us to grow the game over time."

On February 20, 2012, the game was made available on digital distribution platform Steam.

After a year of post-release game development, Wild Shadow Studios were acquired by Kabam in June 2012, with part of the deal being that Spry Fox sold their stake in the game to Kabam. Wild Shadow co-founders Alex Carobus and Rob Shillingsburg both left to pursue other opportunities after the acquisition, while Wild Shadow employee Willem Rosenthal stayed on the development team through the transition until June 2013. Spry Fox went on to develop Steambirds Alliance as a spiritual successor.

On June 23, 2016, Kabam announced that they would be transferring Realm of the Mad God to DECA Games on July 15.

On June 12, 2018, DECA Games revealed that development for a Unity version of the client had begun. A trailer for this was released on December 13, 2019, and revealed the Unity version would be named Realm of the Mad God Exalt. A closed beta for the new client started on the March 19, 2020, given to Supporters of the game who had gotten to Supporter rank 2. On April 15, 2020, the open beta client was released. On July 22, 2020, the Unity client was officially released and became the default method of playing the game. The Flash client was discontinued on September 23, 2020, and remained playable until then.

== Reception and user interaction ==
Reception

Aggregate scores
Aggregator	Score
GameRankings	85.6%
Metacritic	82/100

Review scores
Publication	Score
Eurogamer	9/10
IGN	8/10
PC Gamer (US)	89%
RPGFan	78%

Realm of the Mad God received generally positive reception from critics, with a Metacritic rating of 82/100 and GameRanking rating of 85.6%.

IGN gave the game a score of 8/10, stating that "this unusual free-to-play MMO hybrid is worth every second of your spare time", criticising, however, the controls, saying "it's a shame that the controls aren't as tight as they should be for the arcade-style shooter gameplay." Eurogamer gave a rating of 9/10, calling the game "superb" and "the perfect game for people who love the idea of raiding, but can't afford to invest the time all MMOs require before the really good stuff", and PC Gamer described the game as "Unrepentantly simplistic and fun", and "one of the most distinctive multiplayer experiences around" in their 89% score review.

RPGFan criticised the simplistic nature of the game, saying "the game currently feels a little bare-bones", adding, however, that "with almost no downtime, a true sense of cooperation, and constant challenge, RMG is an MMO that never grows stale" scoring the game 78% overall.

A common criticism of the game is that despite being an MMO, the game is "the most selfish, least social MMO you’ve ever played". It is an issue that often is at the center of discussions among veteran players for why the game fails to bring in a sufficient stream of new players. Players often cite a lack of explanation of game mechanics and direction, paired with a lack of enthusiasm from the game for a new player as a component for the declining player base.

In addition to the game, there is the second-party website Realmeye, which is a commonly used hub for in-game activity. Users can search any player or guild in the game, track leaderboard-ranking players, browse available trades, read extensive guides about various game mechanics, and browse a site-specific forum for general conversation. Throughout the game's lifespan, Realmeye's significance has transitioned from a trading hub to both a hub for community discussion and a method of tracking a player's graveyard and characters. Realmeye is often cited by players in-game as a tool for newer players to use as a crutch for starting off.
