= ZQGame =

Chinese video game company

Shenzhen Zhongqingbaowang Interaction Network Co Ltd
- Traded as: SZSE: 300052
- Genre: Mobile games, RPG, massively multiplayer online games
- Predecessor: a 2003 subsidiary of Powerleader Science & Technology Co
- Founded: 2008
- Headquarters: Shenzhen, China
- Number of employees: 1000+
- Website: zqgame.com

ZQGame
- Simplified Chinese: 深圳中青宝互动网络股份有限公司
- Literal meaning: Shenzhen "Among the Green Treasures" Interaction Network Co Ltd
Transcriptions
Standard Mandarin
- Hanyu Pinyin: Shēnzhèn zhōng qīng bǎo hùdòng wǎngluò gǔfèn yǒuxiàn gōngsī

Shenzhen Zhongqingbaowang Interaction Network Co Ltd or ZQGame is a Chinese company that makes massively multiplayer online games as well as other browser games and mobile games. Prior a subsidiary of a company that makes servers, it was listed on the Shenzhen Stock Exchange in 2010. In 2013, ZQGame announced a joint venture with Shanda located in the Shanghai Pilot Free-Trade Zone.

Some of the company's browser MMO games, including Shadowland Online, are available to play outside of China published on Kabam and Kongregate.

As of 8 November 2016, the company is a constituent of the SZSE Component Index but not in SZSE 300 Index, making the company ranked between the 301st and 500th by free float adjusted market capitalization.

== ZQGame Global ==
ZQGame Global the global publishing subsidiary of ZQGame was founded in 2011 with headquarters in El Segundo, California, US, and offices in South Korea and Taiwan. ZQGame Global publishes mobile games for the Android and iOS mobile operating systems.

=== Mobile titles published by ZQGame Global ===
Year	Title	Platform(s)	
Year	Title	Android	iOS
2013	Sky Boom Boom	Yes	Yes
2013	Pocket Knights	Yes	Yes
2014	Soul Guardians: Age of Midgard	Yes	Yes
2014	War of Tribes: Stone Age	No	Yes
2014	Brave Brigade	Yes	No
2015	Captain Heroes	Yes	No
2015	Celestia - Broken Sky	Yes	Yes

=== Mobile titles soon to be released ===
Year	Title	Platform(s)	
Year	Title	Android	iOS
Winter 2015	Movie Studio Story	Yes	Yes
Winter 2015	Minitropolis	Yes	Yes
Winter 2015	Zombie Corps	Yes	Yes
