= Magic Pixel Games =

American video game development company

- Type: Private (LLC)
- Industry: Video games
- Predecessor: EA Los Angeles
- Founded: May 2010
- Headquarters: Los Angeles, California, United States
- Key people: Jeff Dixon, William Farquhar, Sean Hyde-Moyer, Stephen Riesenberger, Michael Seegers, Mark Tsai, Aaron Habibipour
- Products: Carnival Island
- Number of employees: 25+
- Website: www.magicpixelgames.com

Magic Pixel Games is an American video game development company founded by key members of the Boom Blox team from Electronic Arts' Los Angeles studio.

== History ==
Magic Pixel Games was founded by six members of the Boom Blox team after "routine layoffs" from Electronic Arts' Los Angeles studio in March 2010. The company announced its formation on June 2, 2011, after adding other industry veterans from THQ and Activision to its staff.

Magic Pixel's first title, Carnival Island, was announced three days later at the Electronic Entertainment Expo 2011, based heavily on the team's prior experience with motion-controlled games.

Magic Pixel's first mobile title, Stick to It, was a character-based physics-puzzler released in 2012 for iOS. In 2014, Magic Pixel partnered with Tapzen and released This Means WAR! for iOS, with the Android version coming out in Q3 of 2014. Also released in 2014 was Outcast Odyssey, published by Bandai Namco Games.

On January 12, 2015, both TapZen and Magic Pixel Games were acquired by Kabam.

== Games ==
Title	Genre	Release Date
Carnival Island	Party game	2011
Stick to It!	Platform game	2013
This Means WAR!	Strategy Game	2014
Outcast Odyssey	Trading Card Game	2014
