= DragonVale =

2011 video game

- Developers: Backflip Studios (2012-2019); DECA Games (2020-present)
- Publisher: DECA Games
- Composer: Aubrey Hodges
- Platforms: iOS, Android
- Release: iOS; September 14, 2011; Android; November 9, 2012
- Genre: Park simulator

DragonVale is a park management simulator video game originally developed by Backflip Studios and released on September 14, 2011, for iOS and on November 9, 2012, for Android. DragonVale was one of the first breed-and-nurture games to be a commercial success. The game has been downloaded over 45 million times and has generated a total revenue of over $200 million. DragonVale was acquired by DECA Games in March 2020, after the shutdown of Backflip Studios.

== Gameplay ==
DragonVale is a dragon breeding simulation game in which players design an island park and display dragons in habitats. Displaying dragons allows the player to earn "DragonCash". DragonCash can be used to upgrade a park with new islands, habitats, and decorations.

Basic elemental dragons can produce a specific set of hybrid dragons by being paired in the Breeding Cave, the Epic Breeding Island, the Cooperative Breeding Cave, and the Runic Breeding Caves (the last of which are only available during Easter or Christmas time). The ten basic elements are Plant, Fire, Earth, Cold, Lightning, Water, Air, Metal, Light, and Dark.

Epic dragons are rarer than basic elemental dragons and hybrids. The epic dragons include Sun, Moon, Rainbow, Treasure, Olympus, Gemstone, Dream, Seasonal, Apocalypse, Chrysalis, Ornamental, Crystalline, Snowflake, Monolith, Aura, Hidden, Galactic, Surface, Melody, Zodiac, and their epic offspring hybrids.

There are a number of limited or rare dragons, known as "Special Dragons", that are only available during a specific period of time. These dragons are themed toward specific holidays, seasons, DragonVale anniversaries, anomalies, months, and events. For example, the Ghost dragon is available for Halloween and the Reindeer dragon is available for the winter holidays. Another example is the Tien Dragon, which came out during the 10th anniversary of the creation of DragonVale. Many Epic dragons are also limited; for example, the Leap Year Dragon that is theoretically only available every 4 years. Limited dragons are often released alongside a limited park decoration. Limited dragons include the gemstone dragons, which correspond to the monthly birthstones. Gemstone dragons earn gems rather than DragonCash. Backflip Studios held several "Bring Em Back" events to give players a chance to breed a limited dragon they may have missed the first time around. DECA has held “Dragon Week” events to give players similar opportunities.

Gems are a vital part of DragonVale. They can be used to speed up most in-game waiting times. Gems can be acquired through trading them with friends, winning them in the colosseum and race track, completing quests and goals, collecting from gemstone and crystalline dragons, or by purchasing them directly as an in-game-purchase.

Breeding is the most common way to earn non-basic dragons, they can also be bought from the market for a high amount of gems. The basic elemental dragons can be bought with DragonCash. Alternatively, players can use Etherium to buy mystery eggs, which are available in various rarities, rewarding the player with one random dragon correlating to each rarity. Players can buy new islands to make space for more habitats although there is a limit on habitats.

Players raise dragons to adulthood by feeding them treats grown from treat farms, won from the race track, or earned from the completion of quests. The higher level a dragon is, the more DragonCash it will earn per minute. Different dragons earn DragonCash at different rates. For example, a Gift dragon at level 10 can only earn 77 DragonCash per minute while a level 10 Moon Dragon can earn 256 DragonCash per minute. Certain dragons can also receive earning boosts through different buildings, increasing the amount of DragonCash they earn per minute.

The Rift is another dimension in the game. In the Rift, Gems and DragonCash are useless and the player must collect Etherium. The best way to collect Etherium is having dragons in the rift. The rift has a maximum of 75 habitats, which can be decorated using Rift habitat themes. Many dragons can go into the rift, but the rift has 36 unique dragons.

There have also been several events held in relation to time of year or holidays that require the player to do a number of activities like collecting DragonCash/Gems/Etherium, hatching or selling dragons after incubation, and other special provisions. These activities give the player a certain limited time currency that corresponds to the event and enables the player to buy exclusive or unique items. DECA almost always has a seasonal event active.

== Reception ==
The game has a critic score of 84 on Metacritic based on 5 critic reviews, and a 7.2 user score.
