= Alphabear 2 =

2018 video game

- Developer: Spry Fox
- Series: Alphabear
- Platforms: iOS; Android
- Release: September 4, 2018
- Genre: Puzzle

Alphabear 2 (also known as Alphabear: Words Across Time) is a Scrabble-style video game that was released by Spry Fox in September 2018. It is the second edition of the game Alphabear, which itself draws on creative elements of one of their older releases, the 2010 game Panda Poet.

== Gameplay ==
The premise of Alphabear 2 is to make words out of the tiles on the board to reach as high of a score as possible. The board itself features different bears, and using tiles around them allows the bears to grow into the now empty space around them, thus making the score higher. Completing the levels unlocks more bears and further levels. To play any level, a game currency named 'honey' must be used. It regains at a certain rate while limiting the number of games that can be played successively. The player collects bears as the game progresses, all with their own skills and characteristics. Certain bears can give bonuses for using individual letters. The individual puzzles have 2 modes: regular and timed. This game, unlike Alphabear, has a storyline between the levels.

== Reception ==
Alphabear 2 received "generally favorable" reviews from critics, according to the review aggregation website Metacritic.
