= Road Not Taken =

2014 video game

- Developer: Spry Fox
- Publisher: Spry Fox
- Platforms: PlayStation 4 Microsoft Windows; OS X iOS; Android
- Release: PlayStation 4: NA: August 5, 2014; PAL: August 6, 2014; Windows, OS X August 5, 2014 iOS; July 28, 2016; Android; October 12, 2016
- Genres: Roguelike, puzzle
- Mode: Single-player

Road Not Taken is an independent video game developed by Spry Fox for PlayStation 4, Microsoft Windows, OS X, iOS, and Android. In a take on the Robert Frost poem of the same name, the game is described as being about life's surprises, both positive and negative.

== Gameplay ==
Road Not Taken combines roguelike and puzzle game elements with the hopes of exploring surprises in accordance to the game's theme. As players explore, they will come across wild animals, impassable barriers, lost children and other objects. An object's use is not explained upfront, players are encouraged to learn about each object's use as they discover them, in traditional roguelike fashion.

== Development ==
In development since at least 2013, the game was officially announced for PlayStation 4 and PlayStation Vita in August 2013. Developer David Edery cited recent games FTL: Faster Than Light and Don't Starve as inspirations for the game. Writing at the PlayStation.Blog, Edery explained the formulas the team used for creating the gameplay: randomness and hand crafted puzzles were used in conjunction.

Spry Fox organized a competition asking fans to submit audio of what they think a "spry fox" would say, the winner would be used for an in-game spry fox character. Spry Fox showed the game at PAX East in 2014 before launching on August 5.

Despite the game's original announcement containing a release on PlayStation Vita, that version of the game has not been released.

== Reception ==
Reception

Aggregate score
Aggregator	Score
Metacritic	(PC) 75/100 (iOS) 74/100 (PS4) 70/100

Review scores
Publication	Score
Destructoid	(PS4) 7/10
Digital Trends	(PC) 4/5
Edge	(PC) 7/10
Eurogamer	(PS4) 7/10
Game Informer	(PS4) 7.25/10
GameSpot	(PC) 7/10
Gamezebo	(iOS) 4/5
Hardcore Gamer	(PC) 3/5
IGN	(PC) 6.7/10
Joystiq	(PC) 4.5/5
PlayStation Official Magazine – UK	(PS4) 8/10
Push Square	(PS4) 7/10
Common Sense Media	4/5
Digital Spy	(PC) 4/5

The PC version received "generally favorable reviews", while the PlayStation 4 and iOS versions received "mixed or average reviews", according to the review aggregation website Metacritic.

Critics generally praised the art and themes, but were divided on the design choices. Writing for PlayStation LifeStyle, Dyani Wood felt the PlayStation 4 version "proved to be a very unique game for its genre" and called it "a great game to have in your PS4 library."

In an above-average review for Game Informer, Matt Miller enjoyed seeing randomized puzzles with each playthrough, but felt the "sense of repetition on similar (even if not identical) puzzles isn't worth the trade-off." Some reviewers felt the PS4 version was an "acquired taste" and "not for every gamer." Spry Fox responded to feedback on the PS4 version's difficulty, releasing a patch in December 2014 adding various fixes and gameplay additions.
