= Maestro (character) =

Comic book supervillain

The Maestro
- The Maestro as he appears in The Incredible Hulk: Future Imperfect #1 (December 1992). Art by George Pérez.

Publication information
- Publisher: Marvel Comics
- First appearance: The Incredible Hulk: Future Imperfect #1 (December 1992)
- Created by: Peter David; George Pérez

In-story information
- Alter ego: Robert Bruce Banner
- Species: Human mutate
- Place of origin: Earth
- Abilities: Immense intelligence; Transformation; Superhuman strength, stamina, durability, speed, and senses; Regeneration; Underwater breathing; Gamma empowerment

The Maestro is a supervillain appearing in American comic books published by Marvel Comics. Created by writer Peter David and artist George Pérez, the character first appeared in The Incredible Hulk: Future Imperfect #1 (December 1992). Depicted as an evil version of the Hulk from an alternate future (designated by Marvel as Earth-9200), the Maestro possesses Bruce Banner's intelligence and the Hulk's strength and more malevolent personality traits.

The Maestro has appeared in video games, and made his animation debut in Hulk and the Agents of S.M.A.S.H., voiced by Fred Tatasciore.

== Publication history ==
The Maestro first appeared as the main antagonist in The Incredible Hulk: Future Imperfect #1-2 (December 1992–January 1993). The character was created by Peter David and George Pérez.

The term maestro is an Italian/Spanish/Portuguese word meaning teacher, master or a musical conductor.

== Fictional character biography ==
After a nuclear war destroys most of the human race, A.I.M. and MODOK capture the Hulk and other radiation-empowered heroes to recreate their immunity to radiation. About one hundred years later, the Hulk (now in a state where he retains Bruce Banner's intelligence) escapes and decides to rebuild the world himself. Traveling to America, he becomes disheartened with the state of the country, until he finds people still alive under Washington. The entrance is guarded by the Machine Man, who leads the Hulk to the ruler of the survivors, the 'Maestro', who the Hulk recognizes as Hercules. Afterwards, Hulk meets with Rick Jones, who explains that Hercules is only interested in ruling humans, having sparring matches, and sex. Although the Hulk expresses little interest in helping people after they caused the apocalypse, when Rick reminds him that most of the people close to Hulk were just normal humans, he infiltrates the remains of Alchemax to create the Dogs of War to oppose Hercules's forces.

Hercules enters the fray and fights off the Dogs of War. He then goads Hulk into a fight and easily bests him, sparing his life to make him a part of his entourage. Hulk instead vanishes for a number of years before returning with U-Foes member Vapor, who fatally poisons Hercules. Hulk then betrays Vapor, freezes her body, shatters her into pieces, and has the pieces buried over a vast area so she can never regenerate. As Hulk tries to publicly cremate Hercules' corpse, he springs back to life, sent by Hades to enact his revenge. Hercules proves too powerful a physical threat and even the Dogs of War are no challenge for him. When a former member of Rick's rebels unleashes a weapon designed by Forge years previously to kill Hulk, the evil Hulk manages to use it to kill Hercules once and for all. Hulk confronts Rick about his friends' failed attempt to kill him, but finds him gone. Rick contacts Hulk remotely, comparing him to his father Brian Banner, before trying to kill him with a bomb. Hulk survives the explosion.

Maestro develops a new movement he calls Post-Apocalyptic Existence, or PAX, which will destroy the remaining divisions in humanity and replace it with a single overlord: himself. Maestro implements this movement by expanding his domain beyond Dystopia to surrounding areas like Connecticut and the underground community living beneath Washington, D.C., though the community escaped and destroyed their home to spite Maestro. Maestro also joins forces with Doctor Doom to destroy both A.I.M. and Maestro's former team the Pantheon as they threaten their plans to rule the world. When A.I.M. and the Pantheon are vanquished, Maestro and Doom turn on each other, leading to a fight between the two and Doom retreating.

Driven insane by the devastation of everything he has lost, along with gaining strength from the excess radiation he absorbed from the nuclear fallout, Hulk adopts the title of "Maestro". An elderly Rick Jones encounters the reality-hopping mutant Proteus, who has possessed the body of an alternate reality Hulk from the year 2099. Proteus intends to discard his current body and possess the Maestro. Rick, unaware of Proteus' plan, provides him with Forge's weapon, which may be able to kill Maestro. The plan fails when the Maestro is warned by the Exiles, who are pursuing Proteus. Proteus possesses a new host and flees to another world, breaking the Maestro's neck during his escape.

Years later, the Maestro (fully recovered from his injury) encounters a time-traveling Genis-Vell and Spider-Man from 2099. Manipulated by the supervillain Thanatos, the three battle. Genis-Vell and Spider-Man 2099 return to their own time, with no consequence for the Maestro, when the elderly Rick uses his ability to wield Thor's hammer Mjolnir to defeat Thanatos.

Acquiring Doctor Doom's time machine, the rebels opposing the Maestro bring the Professor Hulk forward from the past, hoping that he can defeat the Maestro. Although Hulk's ability to improvise allows him to score some effective blows against the Maestro, the Maestro's superior strength and experience, combined with his knowledge of the Hulk's strategies, allow him to easily dominate the Hulk and break his neck. Knowing Hulk will soon heal, he shows Hulk around the city, attempting to convince his younger self to side with him. The Maestro is defeated when the Hulk lures him back into the rebel's base—the Maestro throwing Rick Jones into Wolverine's skeleton in the process— and uses Doom's time machine to send the Maestro back in time to ground zero during the testing of the original Gamma Bomb. The Maestro is killed in the same moment that creates the Hulk.

Hulk learns that the "homing sense" that has always allowed him to locate ground zero, his "birth" place, is actually attracted to the Maestro's spirit. The Maestro has been absorbing gamma radiation from the Hulk each time he returns, gradually restoring himself. He emerges in a weakened and emaciated form, but is retrieved by a group of Asgardian rock trolls. The Maestro attempts to use the Destroyer against the Hulk, the trolls having provided him with the armor as a weapon to compensate for his current weakness. He is driven out when the Hulk manages to transmit his soul into the Destroyer as well, exploiting the fact that the Maestro is still technically him, and forces the Maestro back into his still-weakened body, which is last seen buried in a small rockslide along with the trolls.

After Banner is shot in the head, the subsequent attempt to treat the brain damage with Extremis creates the persona of Doc Green, a version of the Hulk with Banner's intelligence. Green sets out to hunt down and 'cure' other gamma mutates, but in the process he begins to experience dream-like visions of the Maestro, creating the possibility that Green would eventually become his dark future self. Green recognizes the potential dangers of the 'Maestro' aspects of his personality when he realizes that part of him enjoyed eliminating his 'rivals', deciding to accept the eventual loss of his intellect as Extremis wears off rather than risk that persona emerging. He leaves the cure with She-Hulk and instructs her to use it on him if he goes too far.

=== Variations ===
==== Next Avengers version ====
In the continuation of the Next Avengers: Heroes of Tomorrow continuity featured in Avengers (vol. 4), Bruce Banner has become the Maestro, leading the resistance against the returned Ultron along with Iron Man and Spider-Girl (Felicity Hardy, the daughter of Spider-Man and the Black Cat, across the split timelines Earth-10943 and Earth-10071.

==== A+X version ====
At some point, the Maestro (or an alternate universe version of him) is sent back in time alongside the "Days of Future Past" version of Wolverine as part of a secret assignment. The two end up battling their present-day Earth-616 counterparts before being forced to flee. They are sent back to an alternate future where Red Hulk is the President of the United States of America, where it is revealed that he sent the two to kill the Earth-616 version of Red Hulk to save the world.

==== 2099 version ====
When Spider-Man 2099 attempts to return to his own time after the events of Spider-Verse, he ends up in a world accidentally devastated by Alchemax and ruled by the Maestro who mistakes Miguel for the original Spider-Man. The Maestro beats Miguel into submission and places him in a cell with Strange 2099. The Maestro travels back to present day by having the demon possessing Strange manipulate Miguel into repairing Doctor Doom's Time Platform. The Maestro timeline is described by Miguel O'Hara as having overwritten his original 2099 timeline. Miguel seemingly slays the Maestro with a weapon from the villain's trophy room, but it is later shown that the Maestro feigned defeat to follow Miguel back to the present day.

==== Battleworld Maestro ====
After Doctor Doom incorporates the "Future Imperfect" timeline into his new Battleworld in "Secret Wars", the Maestro resurfaces as the ruler of the domain called Dystopia. He poses as a depowered Odin to gain the trust of the resistance movement, and confronts the resistance's leader Thunderbolt Ross (this reality's version of the Thing). After a brutal fight, the Maestro offers to release Dystopia from his tyrannical rule if Ross can help him kill God Emperor Doom. To this end, the Maestro sets out to find the Destroyer in another zone of Battleworld. Although he tracks it to a region of Asgardia where it is guarded by Ulik, he is shocked to learn that its final line of defense is the 'Ancient One', an elderly Rick Jones. After merging with the Destroyer, the Maestro kills God Emperor Doom and conquers Battleworld. It is revealed that the entire battle was an illusion that has ensnared Maestro. Believing himself to be victorious, Maestro reverts to his human form, with Rick stating that he'll remain trapped in the illusion until he dies.

Eight months later, in the "All-New, All-Different Marvel" branding, the Maestro is seen working for the Collector as his "Summoner" in the new Contest of Champions. The Collector apparently saved the Maestro from his fate and feels the villain owes him his life as a result, though the Maestro is less than grateful. He is seen scheming to find a way to kill the Collector and escape his servitude. After assuming control of the Power Primordial contained within the Iso-Sphere that the Grandmaster and Collector were competing for, Maestro recreates Battleworld. He is defeated after Outlaw destroys the Iso-Sphere, and is later imprisoned in the Collector's display room.

==== King ====
A Maestro from an unidentified alternate reality arrives in the Old Man Logan reality where he rounded up the surviving members of the Hulk Gang, planning to help them build a paradise for all Hulks on Earth-616. With help from Cambria Banner, Logan and Hawkeye of Earth-616 were able to defeat Maestro, and the surviving members of the Hulk Gang went their separate ways.

It is later revealed Maestro recovered from his wounds and went on to conquer a small town in Northern Canada called Fort Wells, ruling as "the King" and executing anyone who defies him. Logan eventually tracks him down, and after injecting himself with the dangerous regenerative drug Regenix, cuts off Maestro's head, ending his reign of terror.

== Powers and abilities ==
The Maestro largely shares the same powers as the Hulk, but a greater degree due to the century's worth of radiation he has absorbed resulting from the nuclear wars that decimated his Earth. This includes his ability to see and interact with astral forms as well as breathe underwater. Although he possesses Banner's intellect, the Maestro has rarely demonstrated his technical expertise and implies to have built Dystopia himself. At one point, he manipulated Miguel O'Hara into repairing a time machine for him, rather than doing it himself.

== Reception ==
In 2022, Comic Book Resources (CBR) ranked the Maestro's introduction in Future Imperfect fourth in their "10 Ways Marvel Made The Hulk Better Over The Years" list and ninth in their "10 Great George Pérez Comics Every Fan Should Read" list.

== Collected editions ==
Title	Material collected	Published date	ISBN
Hulk: The End	Hulk: Future Imperfect #1–2 and Incredible Hulk: The End #1	April 2008	978-0785130307
Future Imperfect	Future Imperfect #1-5 and material from Secret Wars: Battleworld #4	January 2016	978-0785198697
Maestro: Symphony In A Gamma Key	Maestro #1-5	March 2021	978-1302927622
Maestro: War and Pax	Maestro: War and Pax #1-5	August 2021	978-1302928742
Maestro: World War M	Maestro: World War M #1-5	November 2022	978-1302931186
Hulk: Maestro by Peter David Omnibus	Hulk: Future Imperfect #1–2, Abominations #1–3, Incredible Hulk #460–461, Captain Marvel (vol. 4) #27–30, Exiles (vol. 1) #79–80, Spider-Man 2099 (vol. 2) #9–10, Future Imperfect #1–5, Maestro #1–5, Maestro: War and Pax #1–5, Maestro: World War M #1–5; and material from Hulk: Broken Worlds #1, Secret Wars: Battleworld #4	June 2023	978-1302951139

== In other media ==
=== Television ===
- The Maestro appears in the Hulk and the Agents of S.M.A.S.H. episode "Enter the Maestro", voiced by Fred Tatasciore. This version is the result of the Hulk being exposed to excess radiation from a gamma meteor, which increased his power, but drove him insane and eventually turned him into the Maestro. Going by the nickname "Old Man Hulk", he travels back in time ostensibly to help his past self and the Agents of S.M.A.S.H. stop a gamma meteor from hitting Earth while secretly working to preserve his existence and future. However, A-Bomb's future self also travels back in time to warn the Agents of the Maestro's plot. With the Agents' help, the future A-Bomb cures the Hulk of the excess radiation, changing the future and erasing himself and the Maestro from existence.
- An alternate universe variant of the Maestro who possesses powers akin to a Master of the Mystic Arts makes a non-speaking cameo appearance in the What If...? episode "What If... What If...?".

=== Video games ===
- The Maestro appears as an unlockable alternate skin for the Hulk in The Incredible Hulk, Avengers Initiative, Marvel Heroes, Marvel's Midnight Suns, and Marvel Rivals.
- The Maestro appears in The Incredible Hulk: The Pantheon Saga.
- Two incarnations of the Maestro appear in Marvel Contest of Champions. One version is a boss character who utilizes his own "Iron Hulk" armor equipped with Magik's Soulsword and Ronan the Accuser's Universal Weapon, while a younger version called the Overseer is a playable character who utilizes the Silver Surfer's board and the Cosmic Cube.
- The Maestro appears in Lego Marvel Super Heroes 2. This version is a member of the World Breakers.
- The Maestro appears in Marvel Realm of Champions. This version created and ruled over Battleworld until he was mysteriously killed, causing the Barons to rise up and take control of their lands.
- The Maestro appears in Marvel's Avengers, voiced by Darin De Paul. Appearing as the final boss of "Operation: Hawkeye – Future Imperfect", this version is from a future in which the Kree invaded the Earth. After a nuclear war broke out in the following years, he absorbed excess radiation from the nuclear fallout, making him more powerful while his mental state deteriorated. Eventually driven mad with power, he set out to conquer much of the former United States as the "Supreme Leader". At some point during his reign, he killed most of the Avengers and came to control a large army of A.I.M. robots, using them to wage war on the surviving humans. After encountering past versions of the Avengers who traveled to the future to learn what led to the end of humanity, the Maestro fights them to prevent them from altering the timeline but is defeated.
- The Maestro appears in Marvel Future Revolution, voiced again by Fred Tatasciore.

=== Merchandise ===
The Maestro received a figure in the Marvel Legends line.

=== Miscellaneous ===
An alternate timeline incarnation of the Maestro appears in Hulk: What Savage Beast, by Peter David.

== See also ==
- Alternative versions of the Hulk
