= Marvel Realm of Champions =

2020 video game

- Developer: Kabam
- Publisher: Kabam
- Platforms: iOS, Android
- Release: December 16, 2020
- Genre: MOBA
- Mode: Multiplayer

Marvel Realm of Champions was a mobile fighting game developed by Kabam as a spinoff for their other Marvel game Contest of Champions. A free-to-play game with in-game store purchases, it launched globally on December 16, 2020. On January 13, 2022, it was announced that the game would shut down on March 31 of that year.

== Setting ==
Realm of Champions was set in the continuity of Kabam's previous Marvel game Contest of Champions and ran concurrently with it. While Contest was based on the Contest of Champions story arc and depicted multiple Marvel Comics characters from various alternate realities being abducted to participate in the titular Contest in the "Battlerealm", Realm drew inspiration from Secret Wars storyline and was set on the Battleworld, a patchwork planet made from various alternate Earths. Remnants of each reality formed a "House" which was ruled by a "Baron", all of whom were alternate takes on existing Marvel character (such as Gwen Stacy, who took on the role of Madame Web, or Shuri, who became Queen of Wakanda). Players controlled original characters who were members of each House's special fighting force, such as "Sorcerers Supreme" or "Web-Warriors". There was cross-promotion between the two games, as several characters who originated in Realm were added to Contest as playable characters.

== Plot ==
When Battleworld was formed, Maestro united each of the realms. One day, Maestro was found mysteriously murdered. Because of this, armed conflicts erupted around the realms causing widespread war that was imminent. In a last-ditch effort, the leaders of each "Houses" gather in a secret location. These leaders consist of:

- Stark Prime, CEO of the House of Iron
- Madame Web, Master Weaver of the Spider Guild
- Skaar, Warlord of the Gamma Horde
- President Peggy Carter of the Patriot Garrison
- Stephen Strange, the Ancient One of the Temple of Vishanti
- War Thor, Warrior Queen of the Asgardian Republic
- Logan, Shogun of the Clan of Wolverine
- Queen Shuri of Wakanda
- Deadpool Supreme of Los Mercs 4 Gold

They gain late arrivals in the form of:

- Apocalypse, Pharaoh of Pyramid X
- Viv Vision of the Ultron Network, which was seeking independence from the House of Iron prior to the story's abrupt end.
- King Groot of the Land of Groot

Apocalypse states that "all of us should have a voice in this council". When the Barons start arguing, Stark Prime is revealed to be an Iron Man armor operated by Tony Stark's A.I. hologram called F.R.I.E.N.D. (short for Finite Recording Intelligence Embodiment Nanotech Defense). He states that Maestro has kept their rivalries in check as he proposes that they can shape the upcoming conflict into something that they can control as he quotes "If fighting a secret war will prevent an open one, I'm game". He then breaks the fourth wall by quoting to the viewers "Will you join me" as the other Barons look towards the viewers.

=== Marvel Realm of Champions: Elegy ===
The tie-in web series Marvel Realm of Champions: Elegy, which concluded the game, has the news reporter Anathi of Wakanda investigating the death of Maestro. When she combs Maestro's palace for clues, she is confronted by Stark Prime, Madame Web, Skaar, President Carter, Stephen Strange, War Thor, Queen Shuri, and Apocalypse. Upon noting that different items from different Houses were found at the crime scene, Anathi states that this was a Caesar situation. Stephen Strange reveals that 8,000 Barons actually did it.

Taken into the past by Stephen Strange using a spell, Anathi is shown that the Barons were originally supposed to combine their powers and apprehend Maestro. Unfortunately, Maestro was too strong for them. As a last resort, Stephen Strange arranges for a Multiversal attack by calling the Barons from other versions of Battleworld to help out. They manage to weaken Maestro, but a cosmic will tests them to see if they can be as ruthless as Maestro. They all pass.

Strange Supreme and Anathi are then attacked by a celestial parasite called the Chronoserpent. Upon being dragged into Battleworld, the Chronoserpent is confronted by a version of Doctor Strange who summons Galactus. This causes President Carter to initiate a planetary evacuation. They reach an Iron Man-type spaceship as they evacuate to the Contest of Champions.

Anathi reports on the Chronoserpent to her remaining listeners stating how Chronoserpents use worlds as hosts and use hosts to grow stronger as the Chronoserpent did to Maestro. As Galactus fights the Chronoserpent, everyone evacuates Battleworld as Anathi states that it will not survive the conflict. Anathi concludes her report by stating that she will miss the world containing wizards, mutants, robots, and spider people. She also mentions that Battleworld had the best coffee and that the sunset was a patchwork of different skies of many colors. As she concludes her broadcast, Anathi hopes that her subscribers escaped from Battleworld or else they would be crushed by Galactus.

== Gameplay ==
Players control a fighter for one of the Houses, who are named in honor of a legacy character (such as Hulk, Storm or Black Panther). Each character utilizes different skills, intended to represent different playstyles. There is no storyline mode and no other solo missions to advance, as all game modes are a variety of multiplayer: Arena Conquest, in which two groups of three players each fight over control of an area; Stronghold, in which three players protect a core from a group of enemies; Deathmatch, with three teams of two players fighting one another over points; and Onslaught, a survival mode against waves of enemies of progressing difficulty. After each match, players receive a selection of equipment (only usable for specific characters) and currency which can be applied to improving desired equipment on a selected character.

== Reception ==
The game received mixed reviews at launch. Zach Guida of Hardcore Droid complimented the quick matchmaking and the short duration of the matches, giving the game 4 stars out of 5. Eric Halliday of App Trigger Gaming also criticized extremely limited character selection, lack of storyline and mismatched outfits on the characters, concluding that game was not worth one's time.

In a mid-2021 review that followed several game updates, Alex Sinclair Lack of MobileGames.com complimented the addition of Thor as a new character and cinematics which added actual story content, but also noticed that the lack of new game modes made the short matches feel very repetitive, while visuals of the hero abilities were disappointing, and the graphics were below industry average. He gave the game an overall 6/10 score, concluding that the game lacked anything exceptional.
