= Carnival Island =

2011 video game

- North American PlayStation 3 cover art
- Developer: Magic Pixel Games
- Publisher: Sony Computer Entertainment
- Platform: PlayStation 3
- Release: NA: November 15, 2011; AU: November 17, 2011; EU: November 18, 2011; JP: December 1, 2011
- Genre: Party game
- Modes: Single-player, multiplayer

Carnival Island is a 2011 party video game developed by Magic Pixel Games and published by Sony Computer Entertainment for the PlayStation 3. It utilizes the PlayStation Move controller. It was announced at Electronic Entertainment Expo 2011 on June 5, 2011. It is the first title by Magic Pixel Games, whose team previously worked on the Boom Blox series.

== Reception ==
Reception

Aggregate score
Aggregator	Score
Metacritic	66/100

Review scores
Publication	Score
Destructoid	5/10
Electronic Gaming Monthly	7/10
Famitsu	29/40
GamesMaster	74%
PlayStation Official Magazine – UK	7/10
Play	53%
PlayStation: The Official Magazine	6/10
Common Sense Media	4/5

Carnival Island received "average" reviews according to the review aggregation website Metacritic. In Japan, where the game was ported for release on December 1, 2011 under the name Happy Charlie to Soratobu Carnival (ハッピーチャーリーと空飛ぶカーニバル, Happī Chārī to Soratobu Kānibaru; lit. "Happy Charlie and the Flying Carnival"), Famitsu gave it a score of one seven, one eight, and two sevens for a total of 29 out of 40.
