= Star Wars: Uprising =

2015 video game

- Developer: Kabam
- Publisher: Disney Interactive Studios
- Director: Daniel Erickson
- Producer: Greg Hill
- Platforms: iOS, Android
- Release: September 10, 2015
- Genre: Action role-playing
- Modes: Single-player, multiplayer

Star Wars: Uprising was an action role-playing game by Kabam and published by Disney Interactive Studios for iOS and Android. It was released on September 10, 2015. On September 22, 2016, it was announced that all servers would be shutting down on November 17, 2016.

== Plot ==
Set shortly after the events of Return of the Jedi, Imperial Governor Adelhard of the Anoat Sector refuses to release his grip, instead locking down the sector to prevent all incoming and outgoing space traffic to keep everyone within and allow him to maintain an iron rule. He refuses to accept the death of Darth Vader and Palpatine as the fall of the Empire, keeping Palpatine's death under wraps. As the Rebel Alliance only has a small presence in the sector, smugglers, assassins, crime lords, nobles and crime cartels form their own rebellion against Adelhard.

== Characters ==
Name	Portrayal	Description
Dapp	Voice: Steven Blum (Uprising)	"Happy" Dapp is a man that an unnamed smuggler and their sister Riley worked for during the Galactic Empire's Iron Blockade.
Riley	Voice: Catherine Taber (Uprising)	Riley is the sister of an unnamed smuggler. They both worked for "Happy" Dapp during the Galactic Empire's Iron Blockade.

== Gameplay ==
Players were able to create avatars and were able to purchase skills and upgrades. They could amass a crew to assist them in battles. The game could be played by up to four players. Playable classes included the Smuggler, Bounty Hunter, Rebel Guerilla, Diplomat, Gambler.

== Reception ==
It has a score of 65% on Metacritic. Pocket Gamer awarded it 6 out of 10, saying "There's nothing really wrong with it, but if you were hoping for a Star Wars mobile game with a little more bite than the usual card battlers and tower defence titles, you're going to come away disappointed." IGN awarded it a score of 5.5 out of 10, saying "Star Wars: Uprising boils down to the pursuit of upgradeable stuff administered through simple action and scant story."
