= R2Games =

Game publishing company

- Company type: Private
- Available in: 9 languages
- Founded: 2010
- Headquarters: Shenzhen, China
- No. of locations: 4 (Shenzhen, Shanghai, San Francisco, Hong Kong)
- Area served: Worldwide
- CEO: Jared Psigoda
- Key people: Owen Luo; Jared Psigoda; Ben Chen
- Industry: Video games
- Employees: 250+
- Website: r2games.com

Reality Squared Games (Hong Kong R2 GAME CO., LIMITED), also known as R2Games or simply R2, is an international online video game publisher specializing in Free To Play browser games and mobile games. It primarily licenses games throughout Asia, publishing them for global audiences. Its games are free to play, although they do use a micropayment system to generate revenue, through in-game item purchases.

Data breaches in 2016 and 2017 exposed user account data from over 20 million user accounts cumulatively.
