= The Walking Dead: No Man's Land =

2015 video game

- Cover art
- Developers: Next Games (2015-2023), Deca Games (2023-present)
- Publishers: Next Games (2015-2023), Deca Games (2023-present), AMC
- Platforms: iOS, Android, PC
- Release: WW: October 2015
- Genre: Strategy

The Walking Dead: No Man's Land is a 2015 mobile strategy video game developed by Finnish game company Next Games, based on the comic book series The Walking Dead by Robert Kirkman, Tony Moore and Charlie Adlard. The game was released in the United States as part of AMC's big The Walking Dead advertising campaign. At the beginning of 2016, Next Games reported that the game had been downloaded from app stores about ten million times.

The game was released for PC, on the Epic Games Store on January 10, 2024, and on the Steam platform, on July 30, 2024.

== Gameplay ==
In the game, the player controls a group of survivors and maintains their base. Updating the base can be accelerated with micropayments. From time to time, the player fights in turn-based XCOM-style battles against zombies. Teams of three people are used in the battle, and you can choose members from six different character classes. Members can specialize in either close combat or firearms.

== Reception ==
Pocket Gamer UK praised the game's gameplay and graphics, calling it a good introduction to the world of The Walking Dead.
