= Marvel Contest of Champions =

2014 video game

- Developers: Kabam; Raw Thrills (arcade)
- Publishers: Kabam (Netmarble); Dave & Buster's (arcade)
- Platforms: iOS, iPadOS, Android, Arcade, Windows
- Release: Android, iOS; December 10, 2014; Arcade; 2019; Microsoft Windows; June 18, 2025
- Genre: Fighting
- Modes: Single-player, multiplayer

Marvel Contest of Champions is a 2014 fighting video game developed and published by Kabam. It was released on December 10, 2014, for iOS and Android. The fighting game is primarily set in the Marvel Universe. The game is heavily based on the events of the limited comic book series Contest of Champions. An arcade version was released in 2019, developed by Raw Thrills and exclusive to Dave & Buster's locations. A port for Microsoft Windows via Steam was announced on May 15, 2025, with the demo version being released on May 29, 2025 and only available from June 9th to the 16th, 2025 during Steam Next Fest. The full Microsoft Windows version was released via Steam on June 18, 2025.

== Gameplay ==
A gameplay screenshot shows Spider-Man fighting Captain America at Stark Tower.

Players assume the role of the Summoner, tasked by the Collector to build a team of Marvel heroes and villains and pit them against one another in combat. Gameplay is similar to that of Injustice: Gods Among Us and Mortal Kombat X, where the game's fighting arena is rendered in 3D with a 2D plane for the superheroes' movements and actions. New players begin with access to two 1-star characters and can work to access additional characters at higher star levels, ranging from two to seven. Each of the 300+ playable characters from Marvel Comics is upgradable, featuring their own classes, movements, traits, abilities, and special moves, although many share animations.

Gameplay features an energy system that limits the number of quest-based battles in which players can compete. Energy recharges automatically at a set rate over time or players can refill their energy manually. The energy limit is increased as players increase their level. Game items (such as crystals) that impact play are found at the end of quests. In addition to quests, users can battle opponents in the game's "Multiverse Arena" mode, pitting their champions against those of another player in one-on-one matches or three-on-three limited-time arenas. However, the opponents are A.I.-controlled, so it is not an actual player battle in real time. Marvel Contest of Champions requires a persistent Internet connection for both single and multiplayer modes.

Controls are designed for touch, rather than adapting buttons or virtual joysticks. Gameplay includes light, medium, and heavy attack options, as well as block and dodge. The character can shuffle back or sprint forward, and each hero has three of their own special attacks (unlocked with ranks and stars), as well as unique abilities and an unlockable signature ability (if a duplicate of the champion is collected). Synergy bonuses reward the player for combining characters who have a unique relationship. For example, playing Doctor Doom on the same team with Mister Fantastic rewards every team member with a 6% increased attack. As characters take and deal damage, a power meter fills which indicates the potential for unique moves. When the player levels-up their characters, more-powerful special attacks are possible but can be used less frequently due to their higher power cost.

Battles between the characters take place in a variety of locations pulled from Marvel Comics or the Marvel Cinematic Universe, such as Asgard, Hell's Kitchen, Knowhere, Oscorp, Savage Land, Stark Tower, Wakanda, and a S.H.I.E.L.D. Helicarrier.

Characters can be leveled up by using ISO-8 and Gold and ranked up with Catalysts, which are all gained when fighting in Story Quests, special events, and arena. Class-specific ISO-8 provide heroes of the specified class a bonus. Completing quests provides XP (experience points) and unlocks the ability to add more heroes to the player's questing team, up to a maximum of five heroes. In addition to taking part in a global chat feature, players can also join Alliances. Alliances allow chat amongst other members and provide the opportunity to work together in Alliance Quests and Wars, to earn Glory for rank up materials and shards to form crystals.

Marvel Contest of Champions features 3 primary in-game currencies – Gold, Units, and Battlechips – along with other special event currencies. Gold is used to upgrade champions and buy Alliance tickets and items. Units are the primary currency used to buy potions, revives, crystals, bundles, mastery items and Alliance tickets. Battlechips are used to purchase arena crystals, which can give Gold, Units, or a chance at collecting the Punisher. Joining and being active in an Alliance also grants access to Loyalty, which can be used to buy additional crystals that offer a chance at collecting Unstoppable Colossus.

In addition to the main story quest and the versus arenas, Marvel Contest of Champions features a series of other quests for specific purposes. Typically, there is a monthly storyline and corresponding event quest revolving around the new character releases. There are also specific quests for collecting Catalysts and Gold, along with a handful of other selections.

Players can team up with other players up to 2 players to enter a dungeon, later rebranded to Incursions, where there are 6 enemies and a boss. There are 2 paths in the map and the player has to choose to fight an enemy from a single path. Each enemy has a linked node which players have to defeat to weaken the other enemies. This mode introduces a new mechanic called "hacks". A player can choose a hack when arriving on a hack node. After defeating the boss, the player can go to a node where they are presented with 3 options: Revive their team members with 20 percent health, have the option to choose a boss hack or heal 40 percent health of all their living teammates. Incursions can award you Gold, crystal shards and a new currency called Artifacts. Artifacts can be used to purchase crystals and crystal shards from the Incursion store. When an Incursion is complete, the player is awarded with points. After reaching a specific point criteria, the player is awarded with Gold and hero crystal shards.

With the second anniversary of the game (Version 11.1 – 10 December 2016), Kabam introduced titles that players can select. The player starts off with the default title "Summoner" and the various other titles are unlocked by fully completing quests or meeting other in-game achievements.

In September 2022, Kabam released Battlegrounds; a one-versus-one competitive game mode where players battle against each other using decks of their collected characters. The mode includes a drafting phase where the player can strategically select match-ups for their opponent while countering the opponent's picks as well. The player starts in the Victory Track, and can progress through the track to reach the Gladiator's Circuit, where the player can push to achieve a spot on the global leaderboard. The game mode is organized by season, and each season resets monthly with a week of off-season.

In October 2023, Kabam announced Battlerealm Brawl, an in-person Battlegrounds tournament. Players qualified by reaching the top eight positions during the August 2023 Battlegrounds season. These eight players then competed against each other in a bracket-style tournament.

== Characters ==
Marvel Contest of Champions features a wide selection of playable heroes and villains from the Marvel Comics universe, referred to in the game as "Champions". Originally featuring twenty-six playable Champions in December 2014, the game features over 300 playable characters. Kabam typically releases two new champions per month—though this number has varied from one to four. Playable Champions are found in a series of tiers, escalating in power level and abilities from rankings of one to seven stars. Not all Champions are available in every tier, and while most can be obtained through standard crystals, others can only be obtained via specific crystals, limited time arenas, or special promotions.

Each playable Champion is assigned to one of six classes:

- Cosmic Champions include representatives from various alien races, gods, and powerful beings with access to primordial forces of the universe. Examples include Captain Marvel, Thor, and Venom. Their symbol is a teal-colored ringed planet.
- Tech Champions rely on technology to enhance their own prowess in combat, such as advanced weaponry, robotics, or mechanized suits. Examples include Iron Man, Star-Lord, and Ultron. Their symbol is a deep blue-colored circuit trace.
- Mutant Champions are humans born with the X-gene, which produces an extraordinary superpower. These Champions are mostly restricted to members of the X-Men, their spin-off teams, and villains. Examples include Wolverine, Cyclops, and Colossus. Their symbol is a yellow-colored DNA helix.
- Skill Champions primarily rely on their own physical strength and trained fighting ability as assassins, martial artists, or weapons masters. Examples include Black Widow, Blade, and Daredevil. Their symbol is a red-colored fist.
- Science Champions gained their abilities through some sort of scientific experiment or accident. Examples include Captain America, Hulk, and Spider-Man. Their symbol is a green-colored chemistry beaker.
- Mystic Champions wield or channel extra-dimensional energy or magic, otherwise known as the Mystic Arts. Examples include Doctor Strange, Iron Fist, and Scarlet Witch. Their symbol is a purple-colored Eye of Providence.

In some quests, using a Champion of a particular class will get the player through "gates" that block other paths. There are also relationships between each class, and each has an advantage over another (e.g., Cosmic has an advantage over Tech, Tech over Mutant, Mutant over Skill, Skill over Science, Science over Mystic, and Mystic over Cosmic). Champions with a class advantage over their opponent gain a class bonus, boosting their base attack by a certain percentage during the fight and reducing the base attack of their opponent.

Additionally, a few Champions belong to the Combined class, having an advantage over all other classes, and are represented by an aquamarine-colored symbol.

Some characters are non-playable, serving either as permanent guides and/or bosses in Story Quests, or as temporary allies/opponents in Event or Alliance Quests.

== Development ==
Kabam creative director Cuz Parry describes the game as a "one vs. one, arcade-style fighting game with multiplayer as well as role-playing game elements with a quest/story mode where you're pitted against a wide range of heroes and villains from the Marvel Universe".

In April 2015, Kabam and Longtu Games announced Marvel Contest of Champions would be published in China in late 2015. Some elements of the game were changed for the Chinese market. The version was later shut down and all players were transferred to the international version.

In June 2015, Marvel announced the publication of a comic book adaptation of the game that takes place in the main Marvel universe. The comic also introduced new heroes such as Guillotine, a French heroine with a mystical sword, and White Fox, a heroine from South Korea. Maestro served as the antagonist in the series.

A spin-off mobile game was created by Kabam and Marvel Games, launching on December 16, 2020. Marvel Realm of Champions takes place in the same universe and expands on the story from Contest of Champions. The synopsis stated that Maestro brought the shattered realms together as Battleworld and ruled it until he was mysteriously slain, causing the Barons to rise up and control their lands. There was cross-promotion between the two games, as several characters who originated in Realm were added to Contest as playable characters. On January 13, 2022, it was announced that Realm of Champions would shut down on March 31 of that year.

== Reception ==
Reception

Aggregate score
Aggregator	Score
Metacritic	iOS: 76/100

Review scores
Publication	Score
IGN	85%
Pocket Gamer	4/5
TouchArcade	4/5

Marvel Contest of Champions has received a generally positive response, with critics highlighting its combat system and extensive roster of characters while also critiquing its monetization practices. Upon release in December 2014, the game was named Editors' Choice on the App Store. Most positive reviews praise the game’s minimal yet strategic input system, describing it as an effective adaptation of traditional fighting game mechanics to touchscreen devices.

Marvel Contest of Champions has received criticism for its aggressive monetization practices. A 2022 article in SuperJump Magazine argued that the game prioritizes revenue generation over player experience, citing its reliance on in-game purchases and time-gated progression. Several academic sources have used the game as a case study to illustrate common critiques of free-to-play models, including player manipulation and exploitative design.

=== Player count and revenue ===
On 29 November 2019, Marvel Contest of Champions generated close to $3 million in the United States alone. The game accumulated over 215 million downloads and 2.8 billion hours of playtime as of December 2019. As of 2025, the Android version has more than 100 million downloads. Marvel Contest of Champions generated over $2 billion since its launch as of 2025.
