= Kingdoms of Camelot =

2009 video game

- Developer: Kabam
- Publisher: Kabam
- Release: November 2, 2009
- Genres: Multiplayer Browser Game
- Mode: Multiplayer

Kingdoms of Camelot is a massively multiplayer online real-time strategy browser game created by the studio Kabam when it was named Watercooler Inc. It went into beta on November 2, 2009 and was released four days later. On December 9, 2014, Kabam announced it was selling most of its web games, including Kingdoms of Camelot, to RockYou. The transfer formally happened at the beginning of April 2015.

== Gameplay ==
Essentially a build and warfare game, Kingdoms of Camelot relies heavily on timers and resource management. All actions take time, from a few seconds to days. The game includes a chat feature for both "global" and "alliance" conversations.

Kingdoms of Camelot includes a Tournaments feature to create competition and reduce the monotony of game-play.

=== Might of Winter ===
The "Might of Winter" event ran from Saturday, 13 Feb 2010 08:00:00 GMT to Saturday, 20 Feb 2010 08:00:00 GMT. Prizes ranged from 1000 gems for first place to 100 gems for fifth. Players scoring between sixth and one hundredth place received in-game items.

=== Tournament of Crests ===
The "Tournament of Crests" event ran from Friday, 26 Feb 2010 02:00:00 GMT to Friday, 05 Mar 2010 08:00:00 GMT. The event served as an introduction to collecting items known as crests—named after knights in Arthurian legend—which are required to start a third city in the game. Prizes for this event were identical to those in the Might of Winter.

== Development ==
The game was made for Facebook and was first released as a beta release. The wide release was November 6, 2009.

The game was transferred to RockYou and supported by RockYou as of the beginning of April 2015, though Kabam still hosted the game and Kabam Rewards still applied to the game until 2017. The game is now managed by Popreach.

== Reception ==
The game was generally rated positively by critics. IGN rated it 7.6.

== Kingdoms of Camelot: Battle for the North ==
Kingdoms of Camelot
- Developer: Kabam
- Publisher: Kabam
- Release: March 1, 2012
- Genres: Multiplayer Browser Game
- Mode: Multiplayer

Kingdoms of Camelot: Battle for the North is the mobile version of Kingdoms of Camelot developed for iOS and Android. It went into beta on November 21, 2011 and was released for iOS on March 1, 2012.

This game was another major milestone for Kabam, being its first mobile game. It is a standalone title with no connectivity to the Facebook game, as Kabam targeted a different player base for the mobile version. KoC: Battle for the North was a huge financial success and became the top-grossing iPhone app of 2012.

Critical reviews were generally positive. Metacritic gave it 65/100 and GameRankings gave it 63%.

On January 7, 2016, Kabam sold a number of its older titles, including Battle for the North, to Chinese publisher GAEA Mobile. Along with The Hobbit: Kingdoms of Middle Earth, both games were Kabam's top-grossing titles in 2013.
