= NASCAR Cup Series career of Jeff Gordon =

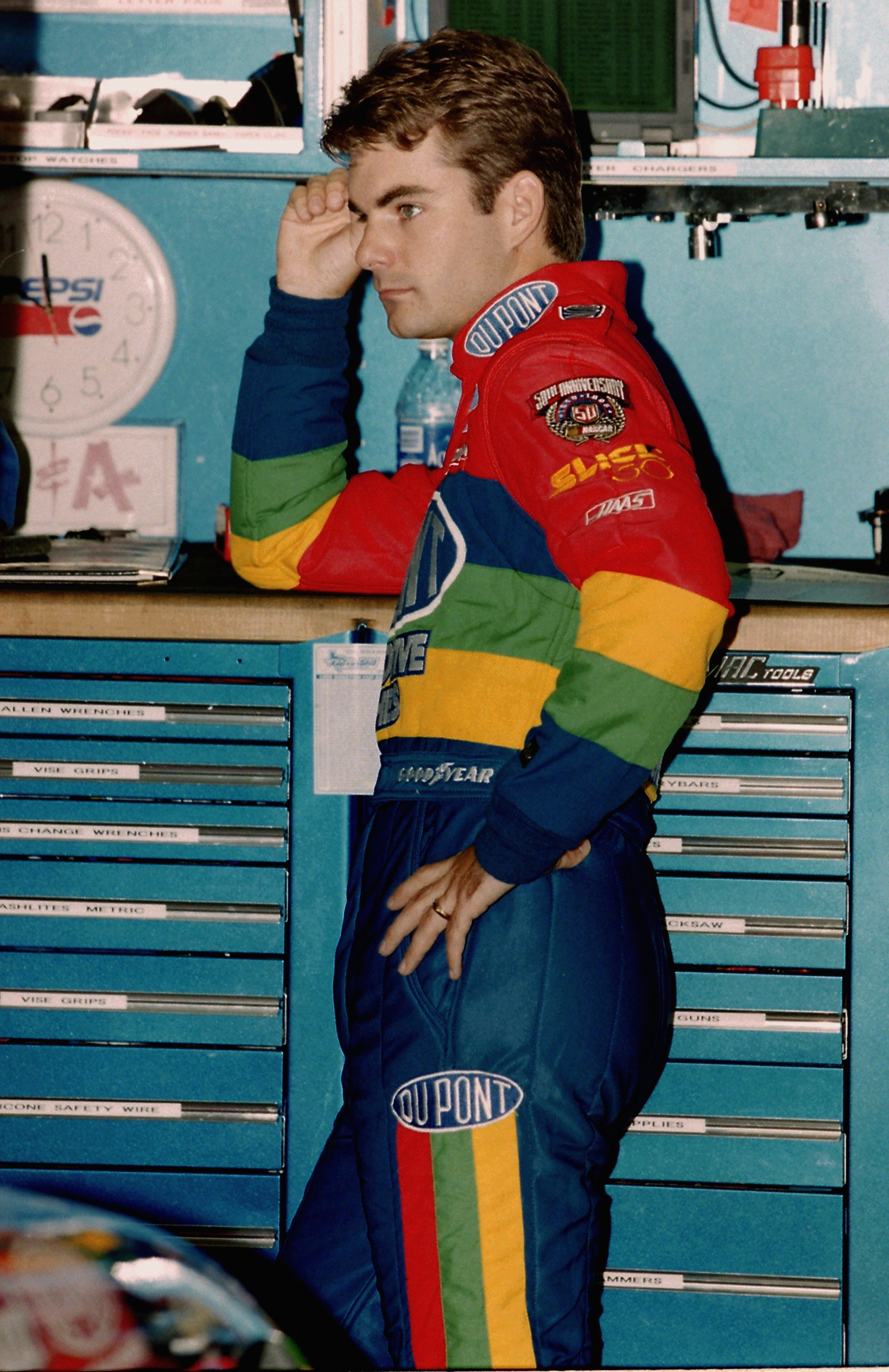
Gordon during the 1998 season

American stock car racing driver Jeff Gordon enjoyed a successful career in the Cup Series, the top category of NASCAR. Gordon spent his entire driving career with Hendrick Motorsports, making 797 starts between 1992 and 2015 in the No. 24 Chevrolet for 24 seasons. (Note: Gordon made his Cup Series debut at Atlanta Motor Speedway in the 1992 Hooters 500, the final race of the season. Gordon joined the Cup Series full-time for the 1993 season, his official Rookie of the Year campaign. In total, Gordon competed full-time for 23 years.) He briefly came out of retirement during the 2016 season by competing in HMS' No. 88 Chevrolet for eight races, giving him a career total 805 starts. Gordon's career achievements include four championships (1995, 1997, 1998, and 2001), 93 points-paying victories (including three Daytona 500s and five Brickyard 400s), and 81 poles.

== Career ==
=== 1992–1994: Early career ===
==== 1992–1993: Cup debut and rookie season ====
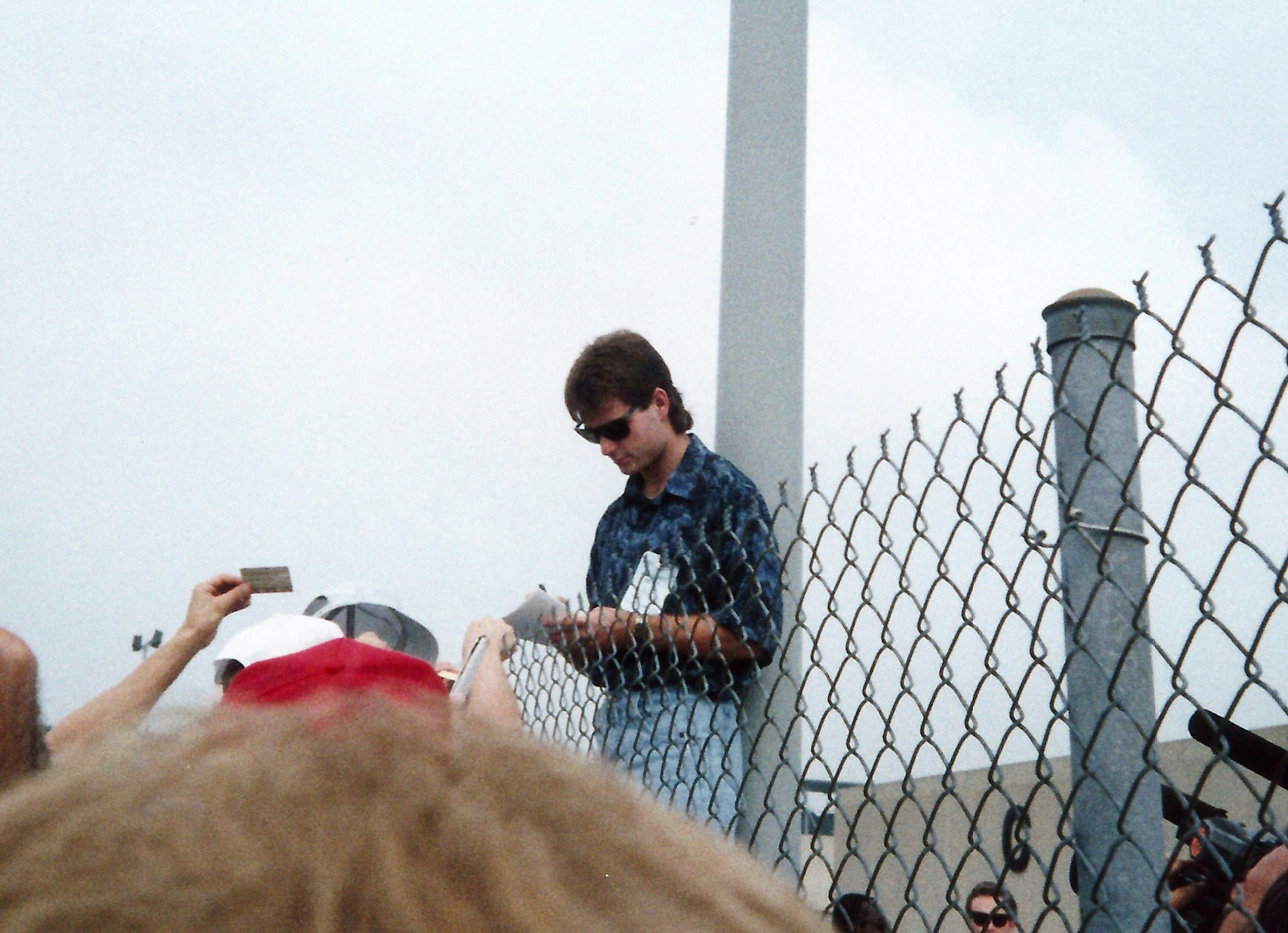
Gordon signing autographs for fans at the Open Test at the Indianapolis Motor Speedway in 1993.

In 1992, Roush Racing owner Jack Roush expressed interest in signing Gordon, which would keep him in the Ford Racing stable. However, Gordon's stepfather John Bickford had wanted Ray Evernham as crew chief, but Roush stated he selected crew chiefs, not his drivers. During the year, Rick Hendrick watched Gordon compete in a Busch race at Atlanta, and two days later, signed him to Hendrick Motorsports. Gordon made his Winston Cup debut in the 1992 Hooters 500 at Atlanta, the last race of that season, and finished 31st after crashing. In addition to the race being Richard Petty's final race in NASCAR and the championship battle among six drivers (eventually won by Alan Kulwicki by virtue of his second-place finish in the race), this was Gordon's first start in the No. 24 Chevrolet for Hendrick Motorsports that he has driven for his entire Cup Series career.

Gordon began driving the No. 24 car full-time in the 1993 Winston Cup season, with Evernham serving as his first crew chief. Gordon started his rookie season by winning one of the Gatorade Twin 125's, becoming the youngest driver to win a Daytona qualifying race. He followed this with a 5th-place finish in his first Daytona 500. He eventually won the Rookie of the Year Award, and finished 14th in the points standings. Gordon's success in the sport reshaped the paradigm and eventually gave younger drivers an opportunity to compete in NASCAR. However, during the 1993 season, many doubted Gordon's ability to compete at such a level at such a young age because of his tendency to push the cars too hard and crash. His last-place finish at the 1993 First Union 400 was a firm example of this theory. In addition, driver Darrell Waltrip wrote he told Hendrick during the 1993 season that Gordon had "hit everything but the pace car that year."

He was given the nickname "Wonder Boy" by Dale Earnhardt, and his pit crew were called the "Rainbow Warriors".

==== 1994: First wins ====
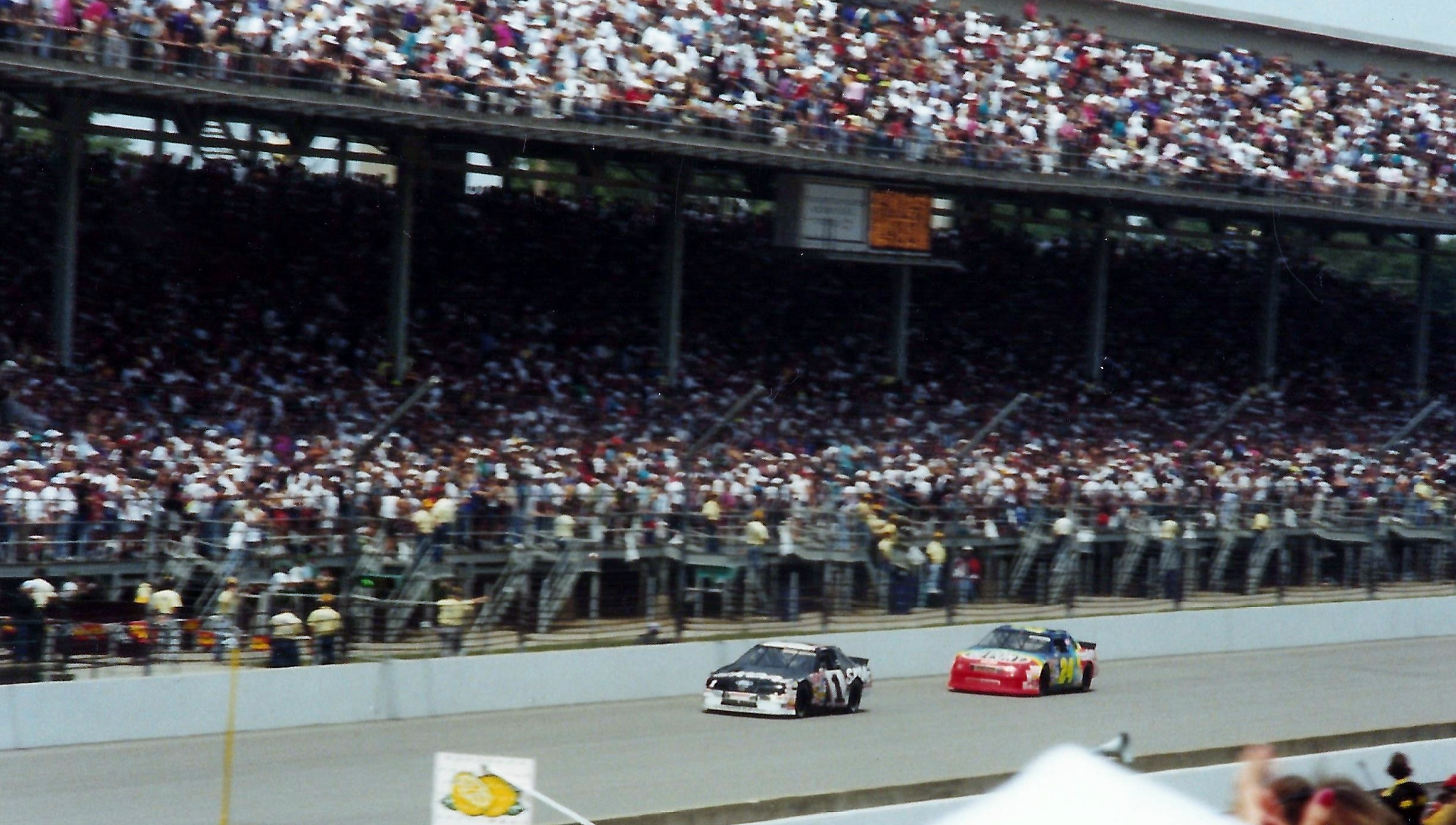
Gordon chasing down Rick Mast at the 1994 Brickyard 400.

In 1994, Gordon opened the season with a win in the Busch Clash; on lap 19 of the 20-lap race, he and Brett Bodine passed Dale Earnhardt, who was attempting to pass the leader Ernie Irvan, in turn 2, and Gordon held off Bodine to win by .3 seconds. Gordon described the pass as a "desperation move" with a "one-in-10" chance of succeeding, and stated he had "to give Earnhardt a little nudge off turn 2, and it worked, because Brett [Bodine] went with me and that's why it worked." He followed the exhibition race win with a fourth-place finish in the Daytona 500. In the next nine races, he recorded two Top 10 finishes at Richmond and Atlanta. However, he also had five finishes outside the Top 30, even though he was able to rebound from his 37th-place finish at Sears Point Raceway by collecting his first career win at the Charlotte Motor Speedway in the Coca-Cola 600 from the pole; late in the race, he decided to take two tires on a green flag pit stop instead of four, and was able to hold off Rusty Wallace by 3.91 seconds. Afterwards, Gordon scored three Top 10’s at Pocono and Daytona, followed by a popular hometown victory at Indianapolis Motor Speedway in the inaugural Brickyard 400, passing Irvan for the lead late in the race when Irvan cut down a tire. After Indianapolis, Gordon recorded Top 10’s at Watkins Glen International, North Wilkesboro Speedway, and Phoenix International Raceway. He finished 8th in the Winston Cup point standings for the 1994 season just 918 points behind Earnhardt, who grabbed the drivers' championship for the seventh (and final) time.

=== 1995–2001: Championship years ===
==== 1995: First championship ====
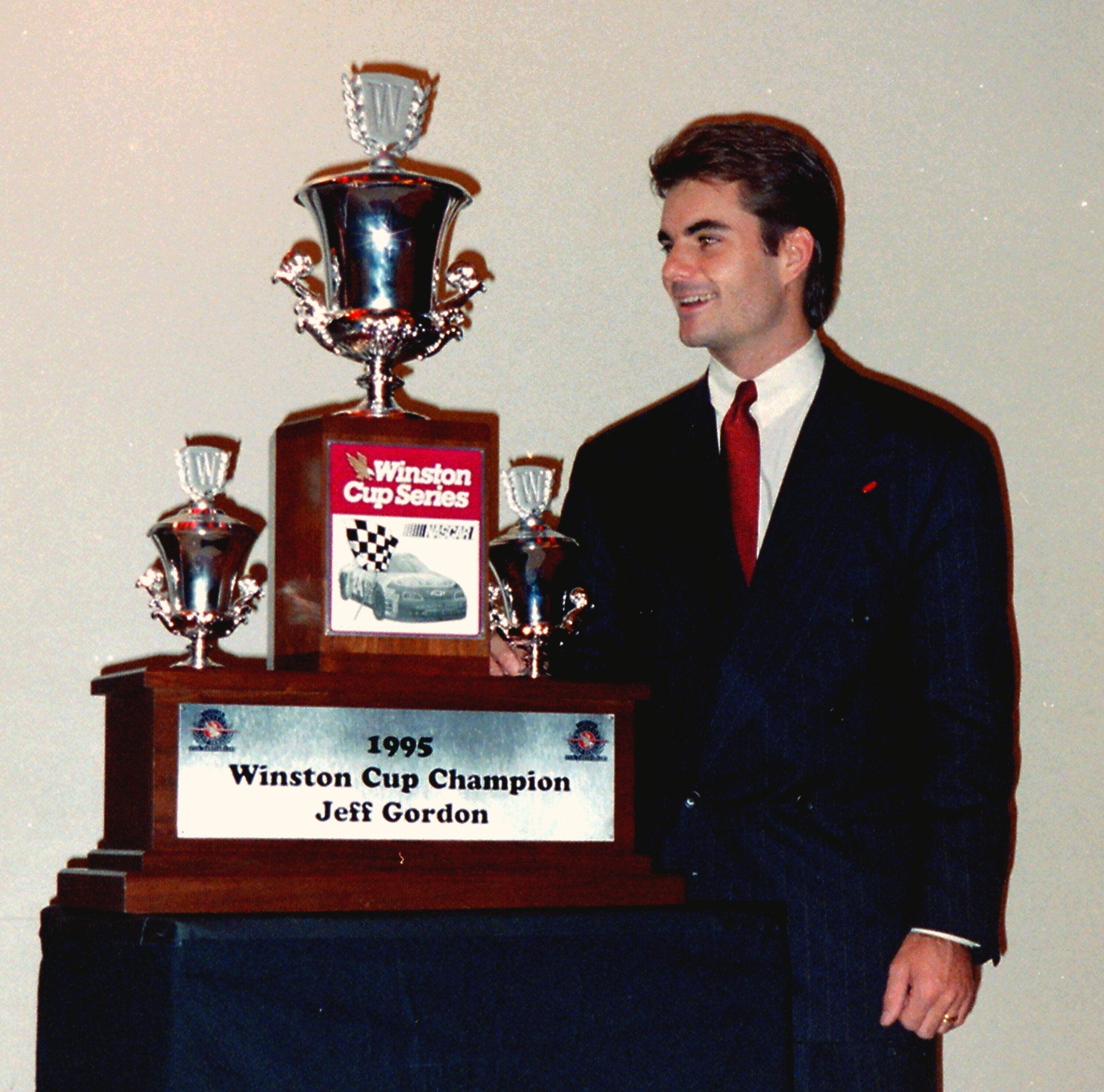
Gordon with his 1995 trophy

In 1995, Gordon had a rough start in the Daytona 500, finishing 22nd after starting 4th. The following week at Rockingham, he won the pole with a lap speed of 157.620 miles per hour (253.665 km/h), breaking the previous track record of 157.099 mph (252.826 km/h) set by Ricky Rudd. Gordon eventually won the race, after leading 329 laps. At Richmond, he won the pole, but a fuel pump ended his day, causing him to finish 36th. A week later, Gordon won at Atlanta, followed by his third one of the season at Darlington, only to crash. Gordon won his third race of the year at Bristol, followed by yet another pole at North Wilkesboro. He won his fifth pole of the season at Charlotte but after that race, NASCAR officials found unapproved wheel hubs on his car, and fined the team $60,000 while placing Ray Evernham on probation indefinitely. Gordon later won four more poles during the season (Dover, Michigan, Indianapolis, Martinsville) while winning races at Daytona, New Hampshire, Darlington, and Dover. The results during the season gave him a 300-point lead over Dale Earnhardt, and Gordon won his first ever career Winston Cup championship. The team's consistency was much better as well, having had three DNF's in 1995, compared to 21 in his previous two seasons combined.

==== 1996: Title defense ====
Gordon got off to a rocky start in 1996, but rebounded to win 10 races. The No. 24 team collected wins at Richmond, Darlington (winning both the spring race and the Southern 500), Bristol, Dover (winning both races there), Pocono, Talladega, Martinsville, and North Wilkesboro (winning the final official NASCAR race at the track). This would start a third-year streak of winning double-digit races. He finished 2nd to his teammate Terry Labonte for the championship, losing by 37 points.

==== 1997–1998: Back-to-back championships ====
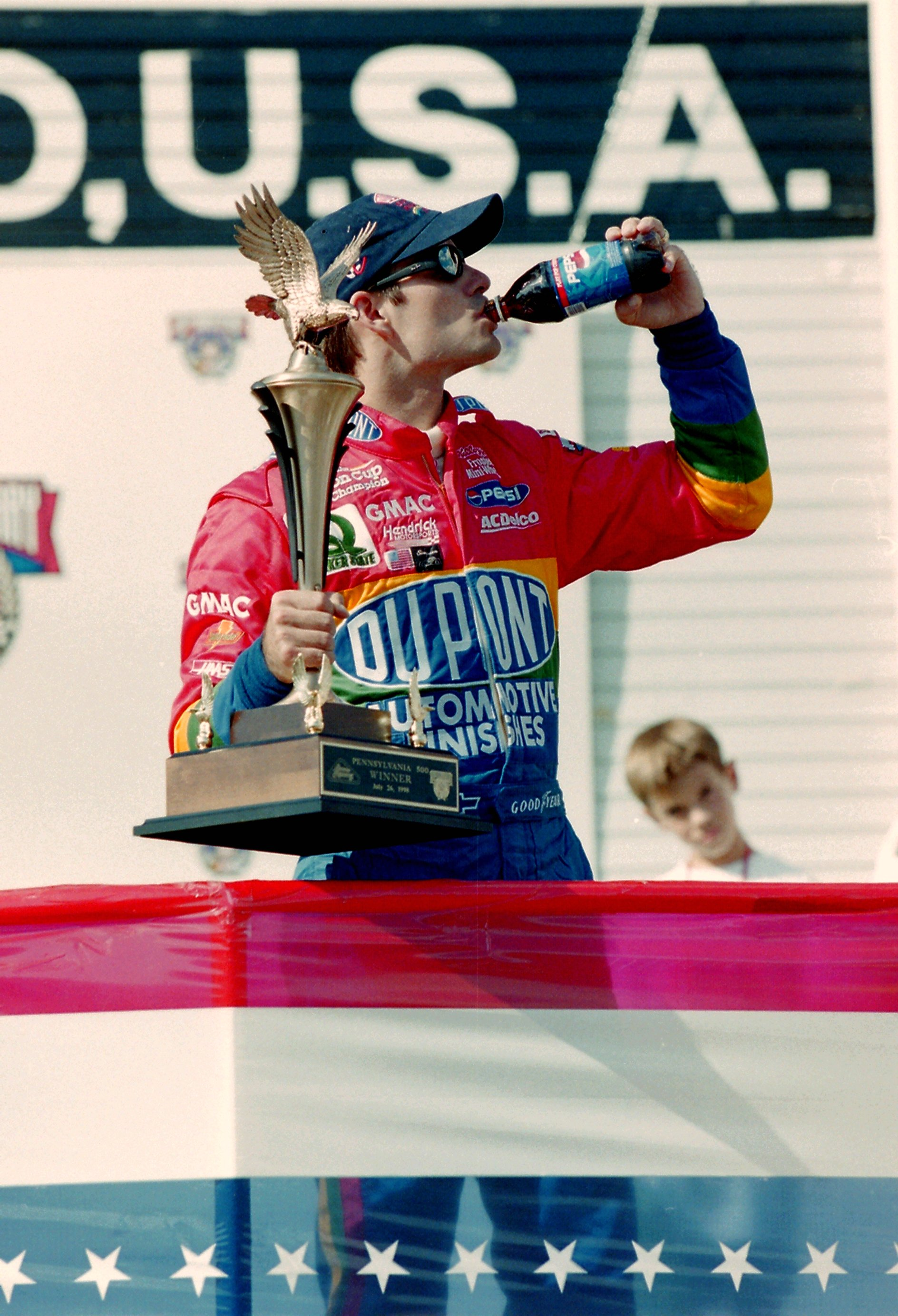
Gordon celebrates his Pocono win in 1998

In 1997, Gordon won his 2nd Busch Clash; after finishing in 12th in the first segment, Clash rules inverted the field for the second one, allowing Gordon to start 3rd. He passed Bobby Labonte on lap 12, and dominated the remainder of the race. Despite allegations that he had sandbagged to claim a better starting spot for the second segment, Gordon said that "once the drivers began running on the racing line, it became difficult to pass without assistance". Later in Speedweeks, Gordon won his first Daytona 500, becoming the youngest driver in history to win the race, a record that would stand until Trevor Bayne won the 2011 race, 14 years later. Gordon won the second race of the season at Rockingham the following week, followed by a third win at Bristol; during the final lap of that race, Gordon made contact with Rusty Wallace in turn 3, causing Wallace to slide up the track, and allowed Gordon to win. In May, Gordon won The Winston at Charlotte in a Jurassic Park: The Ride scheme; the car was modified by Evernham with assistance from Hendrick chassis engineer Rex Stump, and as a result, it was considered illegal by other team owners. Eventually, NASCAR was forced to rewrite much of its rulebook, and later seized the car; it was later restored and placed on display at the Hendrick Motorsports Museum. Gordon would later win the Coca-Cola 600 (also at Charlotte) and he had a chance to become the first man since Bill Elliott in 1985 to win the "Winston Million". Gordon completed the feat by holding off a charging Jeff Burton in the final laps of the Southern 500 at Darlington. While Elliott failed to win the Winston Cup in 1985, Gordon claimed his second Winston Cup championship in 1997, completing one of the most impressive single-season performances in NASCAR history. He finished the season with 10 wins (Daytona, Rockingham, Bristol, Martinsville, Charlotte, Pocono, California, Watkins Glen, Darlington, and New Hampshire) for the second season in a row. His win at California was in Auto Club Speedway's inaugural race, and his win at Watkins Glen began a streak of seven consecutive road course victories.

Gordon started the year of 1998 with a 16th-place finish in the Daytona 500, which was won by Dale Earnhardt. He eventually won the following week at Rockingham, followed by another win at Bristol four weeks later. From 1995 to 1998, Gordon had won at least one of the two events at Bristol in each of those four years. He would go on to win a modern-era record 13 races at Charlotte, Sonoma, Pocono, Indianapolis (which provided at the time the largest amount of prize money in auto racing with $1,637,625), Watkins Glen, Michigan, New Hampshire, Darlington, Daytona, Rockingham, and Atlanta. Gordon won his third Winston Cup points championship with a 364-point lead over Mark Martin. Gordon set Cup records during the season, including four consecutive wins and 17 consecutive Top 5 finishes. He ended the season with seven poles, 25 Top 5's, and 27 Top 10's.

==== 1999–2000: Title defense and crew chief swaps ====
Gordon began the 1999 season with his second Daytona 500 win. He went on to win races at Atlanta, Fontana, and Sears Point, the latter in which he defeated Mark Martin by .197 seconds (the closest finish at the track since electronic scoring was introduced). He scored yet another win at Watkins Glen in a dominant victory over Ron Fellows, making him the first driver since Martin to win three consecutive races at the road course. In September, Evernham left HMS to form Evernham Motorsports. In his place, team engineer Brian Whitesell was named the interim crew chief.

Gordon received a new crew chief for 1999 in the form of Brian Whitesell. Despite winning seven races in 1999, Gordon had seven DNF's and finished 6th in the points standings. During the year, Chip Ganassi Racing owner Chip Ganassi contacted Gordon, expressing interest in signing him, while Dallas Cowboys owner Jerry Jones wanted to partner with him to form a team. However, Gordon signed a lifetime contract with Hendrick Motorsports starting in 2000, which allowed him to become an equity owner in his No. 24 team.

The 2000 season saw Gordon enter his first campaign with Robbie Loomis as his crew chief. Loomis previously had been with Petty Enterprises for years. That team struggled as the rebuilding process went on. Gordon scored his first win of the season in the spring Talladega race, giving him his 50th career victory. He went on to win races at Sears Point and Richmond. Gordon finished the season 9th in points.

==== 2001: Fourth championship ====
Many people questioned Gordon's ability to win championships without Evernham, especially after Gordon's 9th-place points finish in 2000. Gordon answered those doubts in 2001 by winning six races beginning with the Las Vegas race. In May of that year, in The Winston, rain made the track slick, causing Gordon spin in turn 2 on the first lap, and was t-boned on the driver's side by Michael Waltrip. However, NASCAR permitted drivers who had crashed to use their backup cars, and Gordon would win the race, tying Dale Earnhardt with three wins in the All-Star Race. Gordon later won at Dover, Michigan (the 100th win for Hendrick Motorsports), Indianapolis (Gordon started the race 27th, the lowest starting position for a winning driver at Indianapolis), Watkins Glen, and the inaugural race at Kansas. Gordon became the third driver to win four Cup championships in NASCAR history, second only to Richard Petty and Dale Earnhardt (both winning it seven times), and with a 344-point margin ahead of Tony Stewart.

The 2001 season for Gordon ended in a controversial finish at Loudon in which journeyman Robby Gordon punted Gordon with a few laps left to take the lead. Gordon lost several spots and got black-flagged by officials for trying to payback Robby. Robby went on to win the race while Gordon finished 15th. Jeff said in his post race interview that Robby should be embarrassed to win that race.

=== 2002–2003: Late Winston Cup years ===
Gordon entered the 2002 season as defending champion, but the year was far from perfect. A strong showing in the Daytona 500 was ruined when Sterling Marlin sent Gordon spinning in the infield grass with a handful of laps remaining, while leading the race. Gordon had won his 125 qualifier, but finished 9th in the Daytona 500 after the contact with Marlin. It was announced to the media during the spring event at Darlington that Gordon's then-wife, Brooke, was filing for divorce. Gordon did not win until the Sharpie 500 night race at Bristol in August after passing Rusty Wallace, who was slowed by lapped cars, with three laps left. This was his only victory in the night race at Bristol. He followed that up with a fifth victory in the Mountain Dew Southern 500 at Darlington a week later. Gordon won for the third and final time in 2002 at Kansas Speedway, making this his second consecutive win at the track. The 24 team finished the season 4th in points.

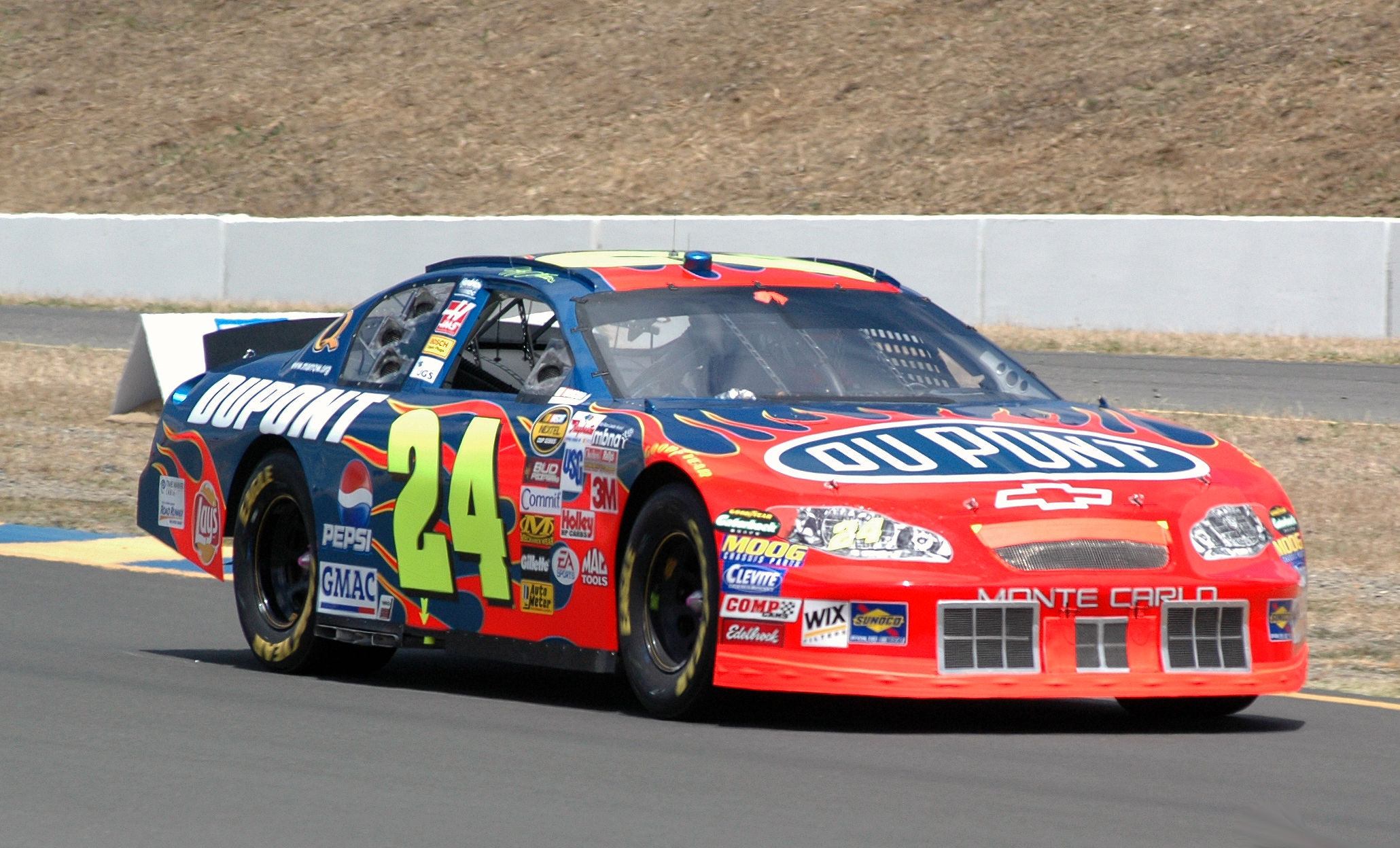
Gordon at Infineon Raceway in 2005

In 2003, Gordon returned with Robbie Loomis for a third season together. Gordon won early in April, winning at Martinsville from the pole, but suffered from various accidents during the midseason, but eventually recorded six consecutive Top 5 finishes, followed by wins at Atlanta and the second Martinsville race in the fall. He finished the year fourth in the NASCAR standings, with three wins, 15 Top 5 finishes, and 20 Top 10 finishes. Gordon also was in 2nd to Matt Kenseth for the championship early in the season.

=== 2004–2007: Nextel Cup years ===
==== 2004: First Chase ====
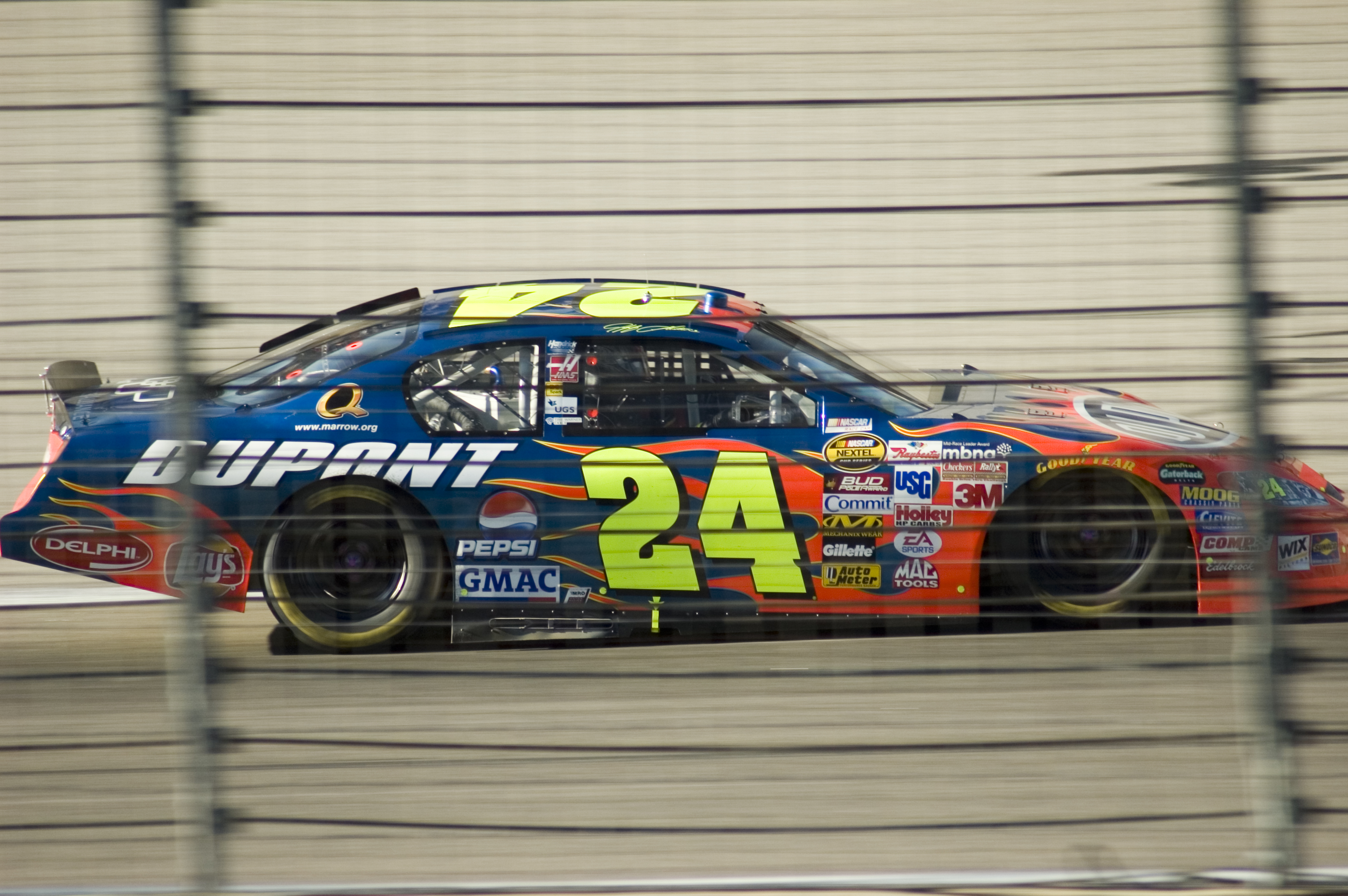
Gordon during the 2005 Dickies 500

2004 was a huge rebound for the team. Gordon won the Brickyard 400 in August 2004, obtaining his fourth Indy win (1994, 1998, 2001, 2004). Gordon holds the title for the NASCAR driver with most Brickyard 400 victories at Indianapolis Motor Speedway with five, and one of only five drivers to have four victories at the historic track. Prior to this victory, Gordon won at Talladega (ending the DEI dominance on restrictor plate tracks, as well as their winning streak at the track), and followed that up with a victory the following weekend at California, in which he won with no fuel remaining. He also won at Infineon Raceway, leading a track-record 92 of 110 laps to claim his NASCAR record eighth road course win. Gordon followed that up with a victory the following weekend in the Pepsi 400 at Daytona after receiving a push from teammate Jimmie Johnson for his second consecutive restrictor plate win. While the Hendrick Motorsports team celebrated success with Gordon and Johnson winning five and eight races, respectively, the team suffered a major off-track tragedy. On October 24, during the Subway 500 race weekend at Martinsville, a Hendrick Motorsports plane carrying engine builder Randy Dorton, team President John Hendrick (Rick Hendrick's brother), Vice President Jeff Turner, Ricky Hendrick (Rick Hendrick's 24-year-old son and teammate of Gordon with JG Motorsports) and more crashed on its way to the track, killing everyone on board. On race day, Gordon finished ninth, while Johnson won. Despite a 34th-place finish at Atlanta the following week, Gordon ended the season with three consecutive 3rd-place finishes. Prior to the new Chase for the Cup, Gordon recorded five wins, and held a 60-point lead over Johnson, but despite the success, when the format came into play after Richmond (the 26th race), the points were reset for the 10 race chase. As a result, after the tenth chase race, which was the season finale at Homestead, Gordon finished third under the new points format behind champion Kurt Busch by 16 points and Johnson by eight. Had the Chase not existed, and if the old points system was still the same, Jeff Gordon would have won the championship by 47 points over his teammate Jimmie Johnson.

==== 2005: Crew chief swap, Collapse ====
Gordon started the 2005 season with his third Daytona 500 victory followed by a win at Martinsville in the Advance Auto Parts 500. Subsequently, Gordon won at Talladega after surviving a two-lap green-white-checker finish for his fourth restrictor plate win in the last five races. However, inconsistency would plague him throughout the year. Despite having 14 Top 10s, he also had nine DNFs, and at Chicagoland Speedway, Gordon was wrecked by Mike Bliss, which led to a confrontation at a local airport. A late season charge (notably Top 10s at Indy and Bristol) put him in position to qualify for the Chase, but in the last race before the Chase at Richmond, Gordon made contact with the turn 2 wall and failed to start for the Chase.

On September 14, crew chief Robbie Loomis resigned from the No. 24 team. Loomis stayed on with Hendrick Motorsports as a consultant for Jimmie Johnson's No. 48 team through the Chase for The NEXTEL Cup in 2005. Steve Letarte, Gordon's car chief for most of the 2005 season and longtime member of the 24 crew, replaced Loomis as crew chief effective at New Hampshire International Speedway on September 18. Despite these disappointments, on October 23 Gordon won the Subway 500 at Martinsville, his first win in 22 points races, and his seventh career victory at the 0.526-mile (0.847 km) track, which leads all active drivers at the facility. He went on to finish 11th in the Championship and received a $1,000,000 bonus as the top driver finishing outside the Chase. It was Gordon's first time outside the Top 10 in the point standings since 1993. Gordon also finished the season with a career-low eight Top 5 finishes.

==== 2006: Ninth road course win ====
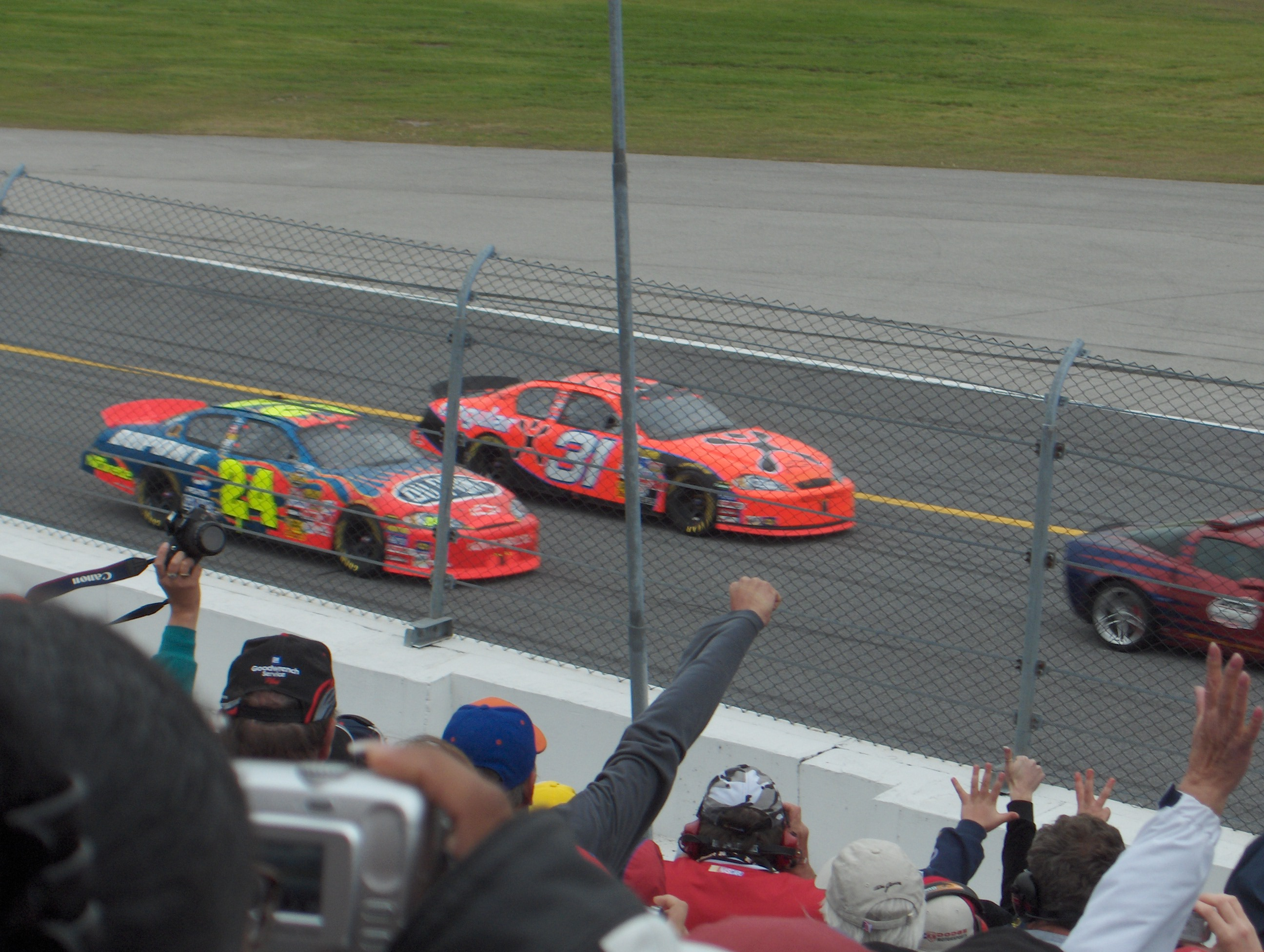
Gordon alongside Jeff Burton at the 2006 Daytona 500

Gordon opened 2006 with a second-place start in the Daytona 500, but eventually finished 26th. During the Food City 500 at Bristol Motor Speedway on the final lap, Gordon had pulled the bump and run move on Matt Kenseth for third place the lap before in turns 3 and 4 before Kenseth went all over the back bumper of Gordon in turns 1 and 2 and turned Jeff around. Gordon would end up finishing 21st. Kenseth was already mad with Kurt Busch after Busch knocked Kenseth out of the way for the lead with 5 to go and Kenseth showed his displeasure with Busch after the checkered flag. Kenseth then walked up to Gordon on pit road as if to apologize for wrecking him as Gordon climbed out of his car. But before words were exchanged, Gordon, who still had his helmet on, shoved Kenseth before he was separated by NASCAR officials. Gordon was fined $10,000 and was placed on prohibition by NASCAR. Gordon won his ninth road race, the 2006 Dodge/Save Mart 350, at the Infineon Raceway for his first win of the season and fifth at Infineon. The day before the race, he announced his engagement to Belgian model Ingrid Vandebosch. On July 9, Gordon won his first race at Chicagoland at the running of the USG Sheetrock 400 after bumping into race leader Matt Kenseth's rear bumper with three laps left. Gordon made the Chase with his improvements on the intermediate 1.5/2-mile downforce racetracks from 2005. Gordon started the Chase with a third-place finish at Loudon, followed by his first pole of the season at Dover, with a lap speed of 156.162 miles per hour (251.318 km/h), and finished with another third-place finish. However, Gordon finished outside the Top 20 in three consecutive races at Kansas, Talladega and Lowe's, due to troubles with the fuel pump, a crash and an engine problem, respectively. Gordon rebounded with three consecutive Top 10 finishes at Martinsville, Atlanta, and Texas, followed by a pole at Phoenix and a fourth-place finish in the race. Gordon eventually finished sixth in the NASCAR NEXTEL Cup Series standings, 219 points behind champion and his teammate Jimmie Johnson.

==== 2007: Surpassing Dale Earnhardt ====
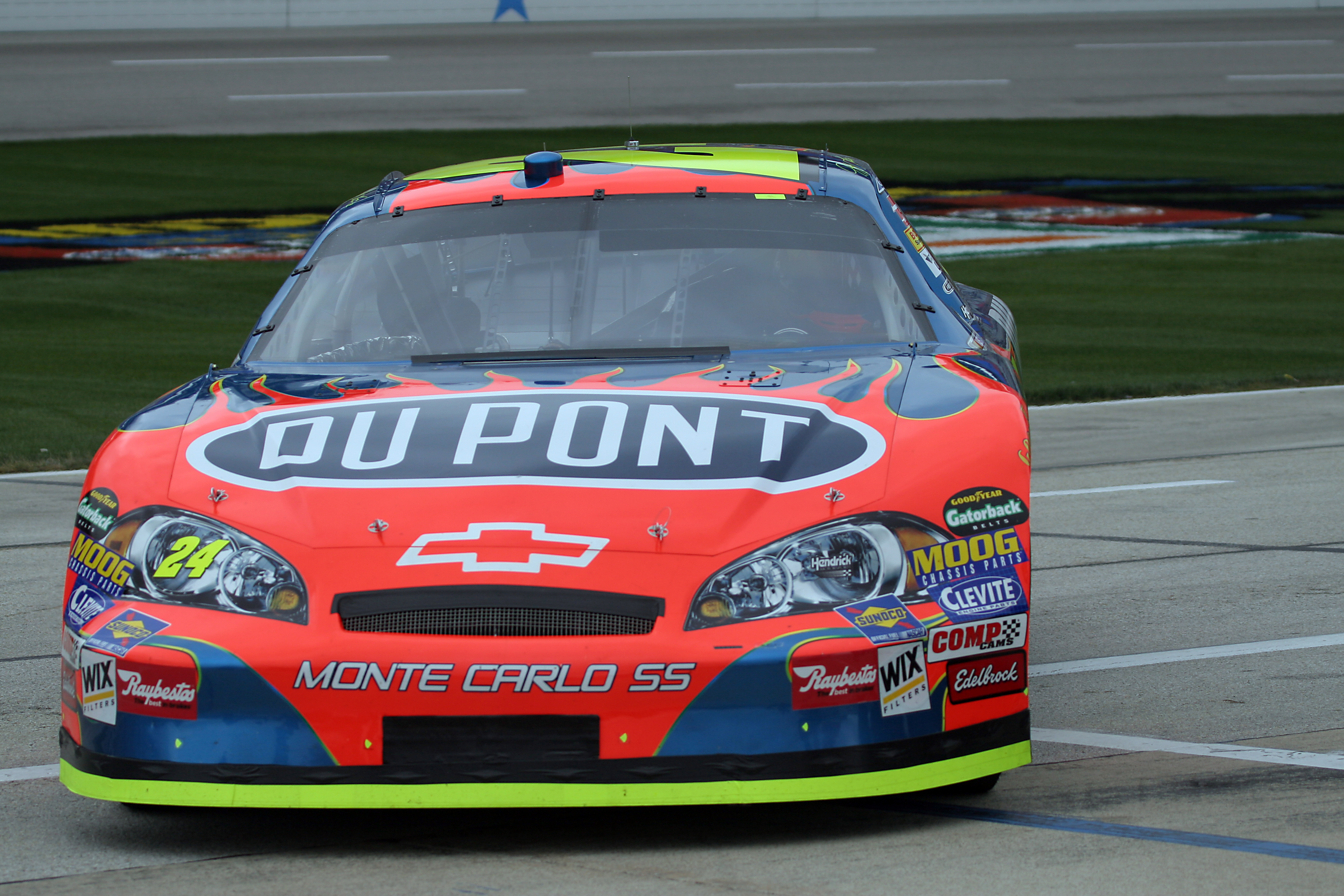
Gordon pulling behind the wall in the 2007 Samsung 500 at Texas

Gordon began the 2007 Cup season by winning his fourth Gatorade Duel qualifying race. Due to a rear shock bolt breaking during the race on his car, he failed the post-race inspection which found that the rear of his car was too low and, as a result, had to start 42nd in the Daytona 500. He went on to finish 10th in the race despite being involved in a crash during a spectacular last-lap finish.

On March 23, Gordon won his 58th career pole for the Food City 500 at Bristol, the first race for the Car of Tomorrow. He went on to a third-place in the race, which gave him the points lead for the first time since the 2005 Daytona 500. At Texas Motor Speedway, Gordon started on the pole because qualifying was rained out. He led the most laps before brushing the wall coming out of turn 4 and finishing fourth. On April 19, 2007 at Phoenix, Gordon won the pole, and tied Darrell Waltrip's modern-day record of 59 career poles. Two days later, at the Subway Fresh Fit 500, he won for the first time at PIR, ending also a streak of 21 races of non-pole winners at the track. With the win, he also tied Dale Earnhardt for sixth all-time in overall number of NEXTEL Cup series wins (second in the modern era). After winning the race, he held a black flag with the #3 to honor the late Earnhardt.

On April 28 at Talladega, Gordon and David Gilliland tied for the pole with identical speeds of 192.069 mph (309.105 km/h), but as Gordon was higher in the standings, he was awarded the pole, breaking the tie with Darrell Waltrip for career poles with 60. One day later, he passed Dale Earnhardt for sixth on the all-time wins list with 77 by winning the Aaron's 499. As a result of the accomplishment, unhappy fans began throwing beer cans at Gordon's car; Gordon stated, "On one side, I want to jump up and down and be fired up about getting 77 (wins) here at Talladega knowing that 3/4 of the grandstand are pulling against us. On the other side, I respected Dale so much, learned so much from him, and today being his birthday and knowing how many of those people up there wanted to see Dale Earnhardt, Jr. win this race today, it's tough. I certainly didn't want to start a riot today." On May 13, Gordon held on despite an overheating car and a late charge by Denny Hamlin to win the Dodge Avenger 500, the 78th win of his career and his seventh at Darlington Raceway. Two weeks later, in the Coca-Cola 600 at Lowe's Motor Speedway, Gordon crashed after making contact with Tony Raines and A. J. Allmendinger on lap 61, only 91.5 miles (147.3 km) into the race, ending his streak of completing every lap during the season at ten races.

On June 11, Gordon earned his fourth win of the year and 79th of his career in a rain-shortened race at Pocono Raceway. Six days later, he scored a ninth-place finish at the Citizens Bank 400 at Michigan International Speedway, the 300th Top 10 finish of his career. On September 8, Gordon earned a place in the Chase for the NEXTEL Cup. With his four wins in the first 26 races, he earned the "Regular Season" Championship, and the second seed (teammate Jimmie Johnson earned the top seed with six wins) in the Chase.

At Watkins Glen for the Centurion Boats at the Glen Gordon started on pole after qualifying was cancelled due to rain. He led 51 laps-the most of any driver and when he appeared to have the win wrapped up, Gordon spun out with two laps to go. Tony Stewart won the race while Gordon finished ninth.

On October 7, Gordon led only the final lap in winning the UAW-Ford 500 at Talladega Superspeedway for his 80th career victory after receiving pushes from Dave Blaney and Stewart past Jimmie Johnson, along with using a strategy of staying near the end of the field until nearly the end of the race to avoid the inevitable "big one", especially with the unknowns involved in racing the Car of Tomorrow. With the win, he swept the 2007 season races at Talladega, and won his 12th race at a restrictor plate track (Daytona and Talladega), making him the all-time leader for restrictor plate wins. On October 13, Gordon led 71 laps and, although fuel was a question near the end of the race, he was able to finish the race and earned his 81st career victory in the Bank of America 500 at Lowe's Motor Speedway.

Finishing fourth in the Ford 400, Gordon finished the Chase second in the standings to Hendrick Motorsports teammate Jimmie Johnson, trailing by 77. However, Gordon's top-ten finish at Homestead left him with a total of 30 Top 10 finishes for the season, setting a new modern era Cup Series record. This marked the second time that Gordon lost a championship because of the Chase points system. Had the Chase not existed, and if the old points system was still the same, Jeff Gordon would have won the championship by 393 points over his teammate Jimmie Johnson. As with 2004, he recorded the most points over the entire season, but lost the title because of the ten race championship system.

=== 2008–2010: Struggles ===
==== 2008: First winless season ====
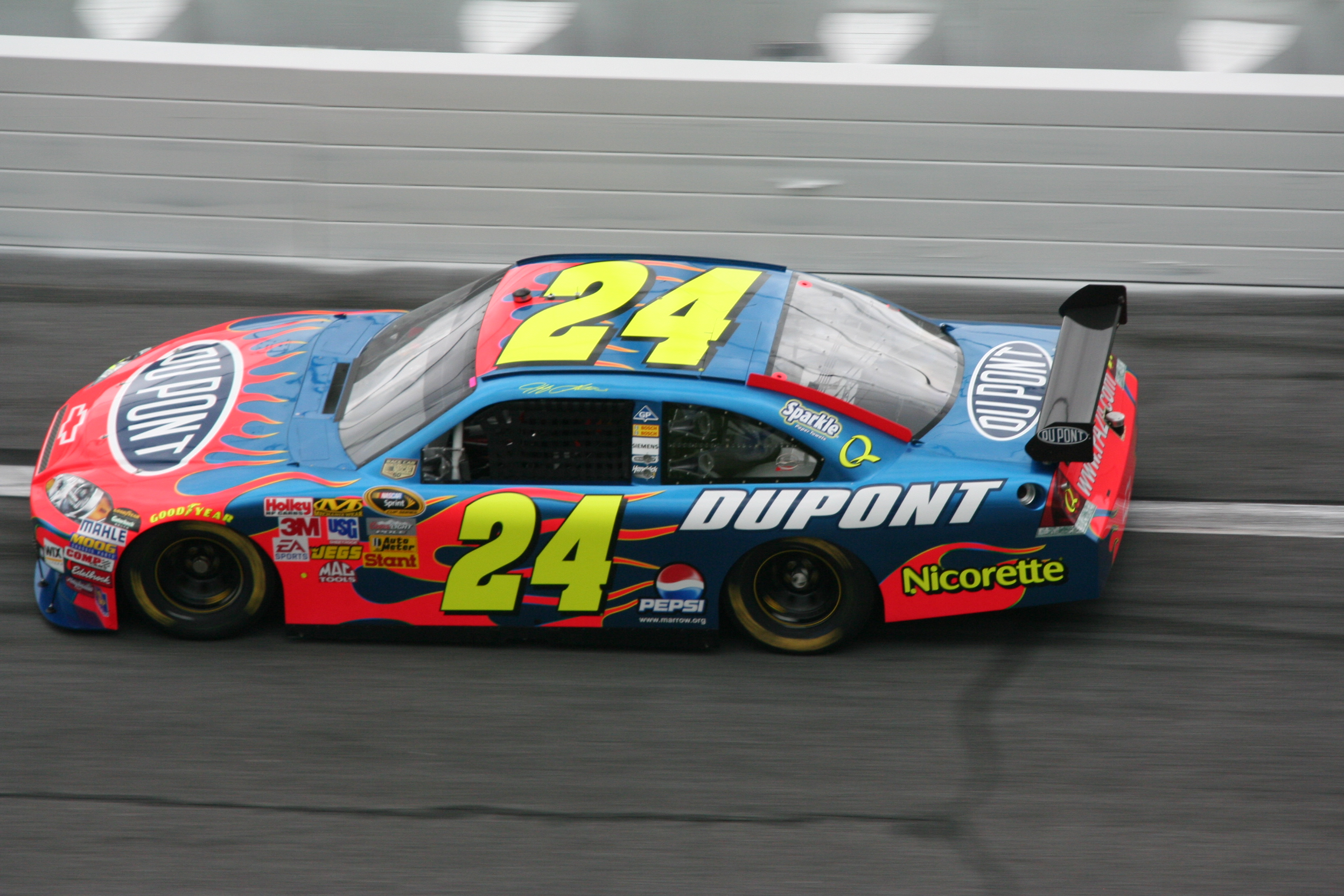
2008 DuPont Cup car during Speedweeks at Daytona

Gordon finished fourth in the 2008 Budweiser Shootout and finished third in the Gatorade Duel qualifying race. He started the 50th annual Daytona 500 from the eighth position and led eight laps, some under caution, but on lap 159 suffered suspension failure and finished 39th.

Gordon wrecked with five laps to go at Las Vegas Motor Speedway, claiming that it was one of the hardest wrecks he's ever had, and leading him to call for safety improvements on the inside walls of LVMS and other similar tracks. The wreck has had drivers and owners from all around NASCAR now concerned with the lack of a SAFER barrier on the inside walls at tracks and the design of the wall where it allows access for emergency vehicles. Greg Biffle went as far to say that the wreck should be taken as seriously as the one that killed Dale Earnhardt in 2001. Other drivers who have publicly supported Gordon's call for safety improvements include Jeff Burton, Tony Stewart, Robby Gordon, and Kurt Busch (whose brother Kyle, a former teammate of Gordon's, would break his leg hitting a similar SAFER barrier-lacking inside wall seven years later).

Gordon collected his 64th career pole for the Kobalt Tools 500 on March 7, then went on to finish fifth in the race after only leading three laps. Three weeks later, at the Goody's Cool Orange 500 on March 28 at Martinsville, Gordon won the pole, and finished second in the race after being caught up in a crash caused by Aric Almirola and coming back from the tail end of the field; Gordon led 90 laps in the race. The week later at Texas, Gordon finished a career-low last-place after being involved in a crash in turn 4 on lap 110. At Darlington's Dodge Challenger 500, Gordon recorded his fourth consecutive Top 3 finish in the event after finishing third. At Sonoma, Gordon also finished third to claim his fourth Top 3 finish in the last eight races.

On September 7, with his 8th-place finish at Richmond, Gordon made his fourth appearance in the Chase for the Sprint Cup earning the 10th seed out of 12 drivers.

Gordon collected his 66th career pole at the Dover International Speedway for the Camping World RV 400, and led 30 laps in the race while scoring a Top 5 finish, while Greg Biffle won. On October 31, Gordon earned his fourth pole of the 2008 season, and first ever at Texas Motor Speedway. Gordon finished second to Carl Edwards.

Gordon finished seventh in the 2008 Chase for the Sprint Cup, 368 points out of first-place. He finished winless for the first time since 1993. This was also the final season the team ran the flames paint scheme that was introduced in 2001. In 2009, the 24 car would unveil its third 'regular' paint scheme. The new scheme was not much different from the previous flames design, but the color blue was replaced with black. This was the first time in Gordon's career that his primary paint scheme did not feature the color blue.

==== 2009: Rebound ====
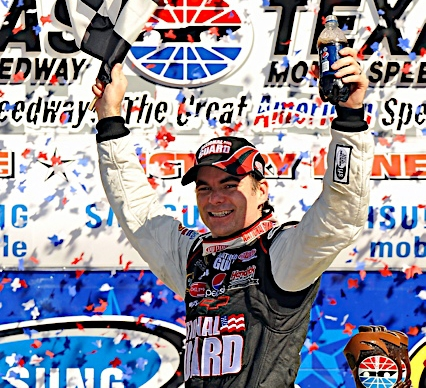
Gordon in victory lane at Texas Motor Speedway

Gordon started off the 2009 season by drawing the 28th and final position of the Budweiser Shootout. Gordon finished fourth in the Shootout, the same finish he had in 2008 after getting through three wrecks, including a last lap crash. He held off Tony Stewart to win his fifth Gatorade Duel. It was his first win in 41 races, dating back to October 2007. As a result of the win, Gordon started third in the Daytona 500 and, after overcoming a tire issue late in the race, finished 13th. The following week at the Auto Club 500, despite leading 64 laps, Gordon finished second to Matt Kenseth, marking Gordon's ninth Top 5 finish at California. At the Shelby 427 in Las Vegas, Gordon led 17 laps but cut a tire coming into the pits and as a result he finished sixth, despite having a shredded fender. Gordon took his first points lead since 2007. A week later at Atlanta, Gordon collected his second top five of the year in the Kobalt Tools 500 after leading 36 laps. Gordon extended his points lead to 77 points at Bristol in the Food City 500 after finishing fourth. The lead increased to 90 points over Clint Bowyer after leading 147 laps and finishing fourth at Martinsville in the Goody's Fast Relief 500.

Gordon ended his 47 race winless streak, winning the Samsung 500 for his 82nd career victory and his first at Texas Motor Speedway. He held off teammate Jimmie Johnson for the win and extended his points lead to 162 points. Gordon also led 105 of the 334 laps, earning him 10 bonus points.

Gordon scored a fifth-place in the Southern 500, despite a loose wheel in the beginning of the race. It was Gordon's fifth consecutive Top 5 finish at the track. He extended his point lead to 31 points over Tony Stewart. Gordon scored second-place finishes behind teammate Mark Martin, in both the June LifeLock 400 at Michigan and the July LifeLock.com 400 at Chicagoland. Because Martin and Gordon finished 1–2 in both races, LifeLock will pay a $1 million bonus to a Colorado family.

Gordon qualified for the 2009 Chase by virtue of his second-place standing in the points following the Chevy Rock & Roll 400. However, reseeding eventually dropped him to sixth in the points.

Gordon scored two consecutive second-place finishes at Kansas and California. He finished second to Tony Stewart and Johnson in those races and was third in points behind by 112 points by the second Texas race, and was 168 points down after Phoenix. He finished third in points giving Hendrick Motorsports the first team ever to finish 1–2–3 in the points, finishing behind teammates Mark Martin and Johnson, who became the first driver to win four consecutive titles. During the 2009 season, Gordon became the first driver in NASCAR history to pass $100 million USD in career winnings.

==== 2010: Second winless season ====
Gordon started off the 2010 season slow, starting with a 26th-place finish in the Daytona 500 and a 19th-place finish at Auto Club Speedway. However, at Las Vegas, Gordon dominated, leading 219 of the race's 267 laps. Unfortunately for Gordon, crew chief Steve Letarte opted to take two tires instead of four, arguably costing Gordon the win, as his teammate Jimmie Johnson passed him on four fresh tires. Gordon was eventually also passed by Kevin Harvick, and finished 3rd. Gordon finished 18th at the Kobalt Tools 500 at Atlanta. Gordon was leading with two laps to go at Martinsville in the spring, but a bump from Matt Kenseth and a charge from Denny Hamlin relegated the No. 24 DuPont-sponsored team to a third-place finish.

Gordon scored a runner-up finish in the Subway Fresh Fit 600 to eventual winner Ryan Newman. Gordon led 124 laps at Texas, but was involved in a multi-car wreck late in the race. Gordon went on to lead four laps at Talladega but was caught up in a wreck with Jeff Burton near the end of the race and dropped him down to a 22nd-place finish. Gordon was leading on the final restart of the Crown Royal Presents the Heath Calhoun 400, but was passed by the winner of the race, Kyle Busch. This was Gordon's eighth second-place finish since his last win came at Texas a year ago. At the Southern 500 at Darlington, Gordon led a race-high 110 laps, but was shuffled back to the end of the lead lap as a result of pitting early under caution. He eventually worked his way up in the last 20 laps to finish fourth.

In Dover, Gordon finished 11th after he was a Top 15 car all day in a 400 lap event. Gordon recorded a sixth-place finish at Charlotte, after opting for track position over pitting with 20 laps to go. Gordon did not have a very fast car, but managed to hold on to a Top 10 finish. Gordon made his 600th career NASCAR Sprint Cup start in the 2010 Lifelock.com 400 on July 10 at the Chicagoland Speedway and finished third. Gordon cut a right front tire late at the Carfax 400 at Michigan, resulting in a 27th-place finish, but remained second in the points standings. Gordon finished 13th at the Emory Healthcare 500 in Atlanta, and continued to stay in second. The Chase started well for Gordon, finishing sixth at Loudon. After struggling at Dover, he finished fifth at Kansas, and ninth at Fontana. He earned his first pole of the season at Charlotte and he was the pick to win the race, but unfortunately, he had battery issues and he was caught speeding on pit road finished a disappointing 23rd-place finish.

At Martinsville, he got wrecked by Kurt Busch, ending his championship hopes. At Texas, he was running well, until an incident occurred between him and Jeff Burton on lap 192. Burton clipped the back of Gordon's car, sending him into the wall, which eventually caused them to have a shove and a physical fight. He would finish 37th. In the Ford 400, he started 11th and finished 37th, due to an engine failure. He went winless again, and it would be the third time in his career he went winless (also in 1993 and 2008).

=== 2011–2016: Final years ===
==== 2011: First year with Alan Gustafson ====
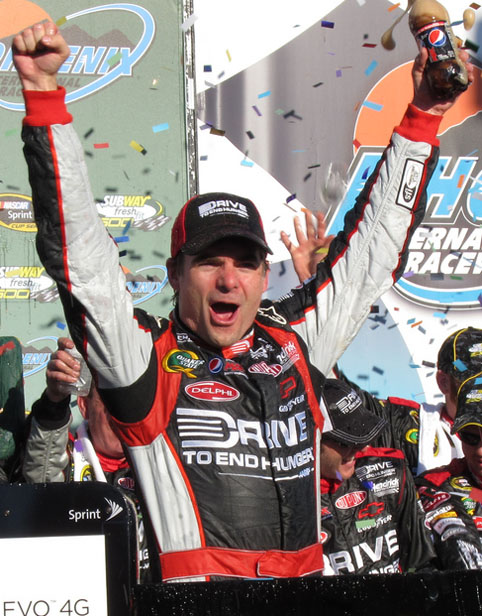
Gordon after his victory at Phoenix

Gordon would have a new crew chief in Alan Gustafson, who had moved over from Mark Martin's No. 5 team after Steve Letarte was reassigned to Dale Earnhardt Jr.'s team. Gordon would also have a new primary sponsor with non-profit AARP through the Drive to End Hunger campaign. Gordon's longtime sponsor, DuPont, had scaled back to secondary sponsorship. He started the Daytona 500 in the second position but after a pileup in turn 3 on lap 29, finished the race in 28th, right behind teammate Jimmie Johnson. The following week at Phoenix, Gordon won for the first time since Texas in April 2009 (a span of 66 races), and his second win in the previous three seasons. Over the next 5 races, Gordon only had one top 10.

Gordon won his 70th pole at the 2011 Aaron's 499 at Talladega after qualifying with a lap speed of 178.248 mph (286.862 km/h), breaking a 3rd-place tie with Cale Yarborough for most poles. All four of the Hendrick Motorsports cars swept the top four positions, with Jimmie Johnson starting on Gordon's outside, with the second row being filled by Mark Martin and Dale Earnhardt Jr. Gordon drafted with Martin for the entire race. He led a few laps at the beginning of the race, but then purposely fell outside the Top 30 to avoid any trouble. With 10 laps to go, Gordon and Martin started their charge to the front, taking the lead at the white flag. Then, while side-by-side with Clint Bowyer and Kevin Harvick, coming through the tri-oval, Johnson and Earnhardt, who had also been drafting together the entire race, squeezed to their inside. Earnhardt rubbed fenders with Martin, killing his and Gordon's momentum. Gordon finished third, in a three-wide photo-finish won by Johnson over Bowyer by 0.002 seconds.

Over the next four races, he finished outside of the Top 10. At Kansas, in the 13th race, Gordon finished 4th behind some fuel-strategy winners. After starting third at Pocono, Gordon won for the second time, his 84th career win, tying for third all-time with Darrell Waltrip and Bobby Allison, and his fifth win at Pocono, tying him with Bill Elliott for all-time wins at the racetrack. At Michigan, he had a poor finish of 17th. At Infineon he finished second. This started a streak of nine races in the top 13. At Bristol, Gordon led 206 laps, but finished third behind Martin Truex Jr. and Brad Keselowski due to the placement of his pit stall (at the start of the backstretch) slowing him down because of NASCAR's timing lines for the track.

The following Sunday race at Atlanta was delayed due to rain, and was moved to Tuesday, due to a tropical storm (Lee) on the track on Monday. Gordon held off his protégé and teammate Jimmie Johnson for the final lap and took his third victory of the season as well as his 85th career win, placing third on the all-time win list, behind Richard Petty and David Pearson; Gordon became the winningest driver in the 'modern era' of the sport, passing Darrell Waltrip. At Richmond, Gordon had a poor start, but shot back with a finish of third, with Kevin Harvick winning the race, and Carl Edwards in second. Gordon had the lead, but after Harvick's Richard Childress Racing teammate Paul Menard spun into the grass to cause a caution, Harvick beat Gordon out of the pits to take the lead.

Gordon's summer hot streak made him a top pick for the 2011 Chase for the Sprint Cup. He was seeded third for the Chase, because of his three wins. His Chase started off with a disappointing 24th finish at Chicagoland, making a deep hole to climb out of early in the Chase. At New Hampshire Motor Speedway, looked to be a rebound race for Gordon, as he ran well in the spring race. A fourth-place finish boosted him to 5th in points. At Dover International Speedway, the third race in the Chase, a solid 12th-place finish relegated him to ninth in points. At Kansas, Charlotte, and Talladega, Gordon had poor finishes of 34th, 21st, and 27th. At both Martinsville and Texas, he finished inside the Top 10. But at Phoenix, he finished 32nd, 112 points behind the leader.

To close out the 2011 season, Gordon was hoping to scratch Homestead-Miami Speedway off his list of tracks he has failed to win at in the Cup Series at the Ford 400, but Tony Stewart and Carl Edwards were the class of the field as both were fighting for the win and the championship. Gordon wound up leading a few laps and coming home with a 5th-place finish. He closed out 2011 eighth in the points with his first multi-win season since 2007.

==== 2012: Summer charge to make the Chase/Final year with DuPont ====
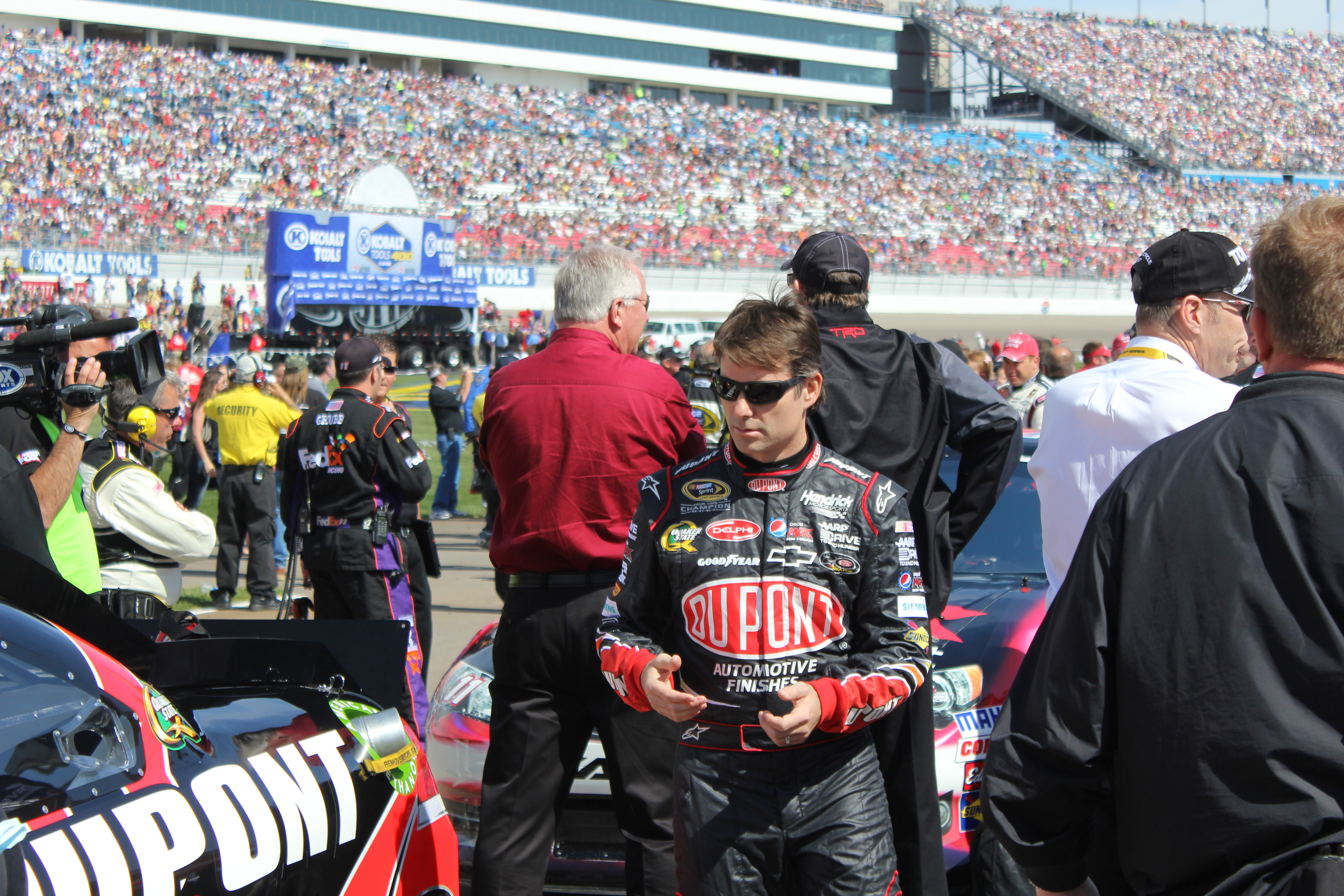
Gordon before the start of the Kobalt Tools 400

Gordon's 2012 season started on a frightening note in the Bud Shootout. With two laps to go, Gordon got into a very loose No. 18 car of Kyle Busch and spun him around, collecting other cars. Gordon moved up the race track to avoid the spinning 18, but came across the nose of the No. 51 of Kurt Busch, Kyle's older brother. This was the first time that he ever flipped a stock car.

In the Daytona 500, Gordon finished 40th after a blown engine on Lap 81, but rebounded with an 8th-place finish the following week at Phoenix. At Martinsville, Gordon led a race-high 328 laps, but Gordon would crash on the 504th lap after Clint Bowyer collided with Gordon and Jimmie Johnson on the restart and Gordon would ultimately finish 14th. At Talladega, Gordon won the pole position, and immediately began experiencing overheating issues with his car and was forced to ride in the mid 20s for a majority of the race, but was eventually caught up in a crash on lap 142 that took out him out along with Carl Edwards, Juan Pablo Montoya, Landon Cassill, Dave Blaney and Martin Truex Jr. In the 2012 Toyota/Save Mart 350, Gordon would reach a milestone by reaching the 23,000 laps led mark after leading 13 in the race, the most of the current Sprint Cup drivers and ranked 7th all-time. However, Gordon would then run out of fuel and ultimately finish 6th.

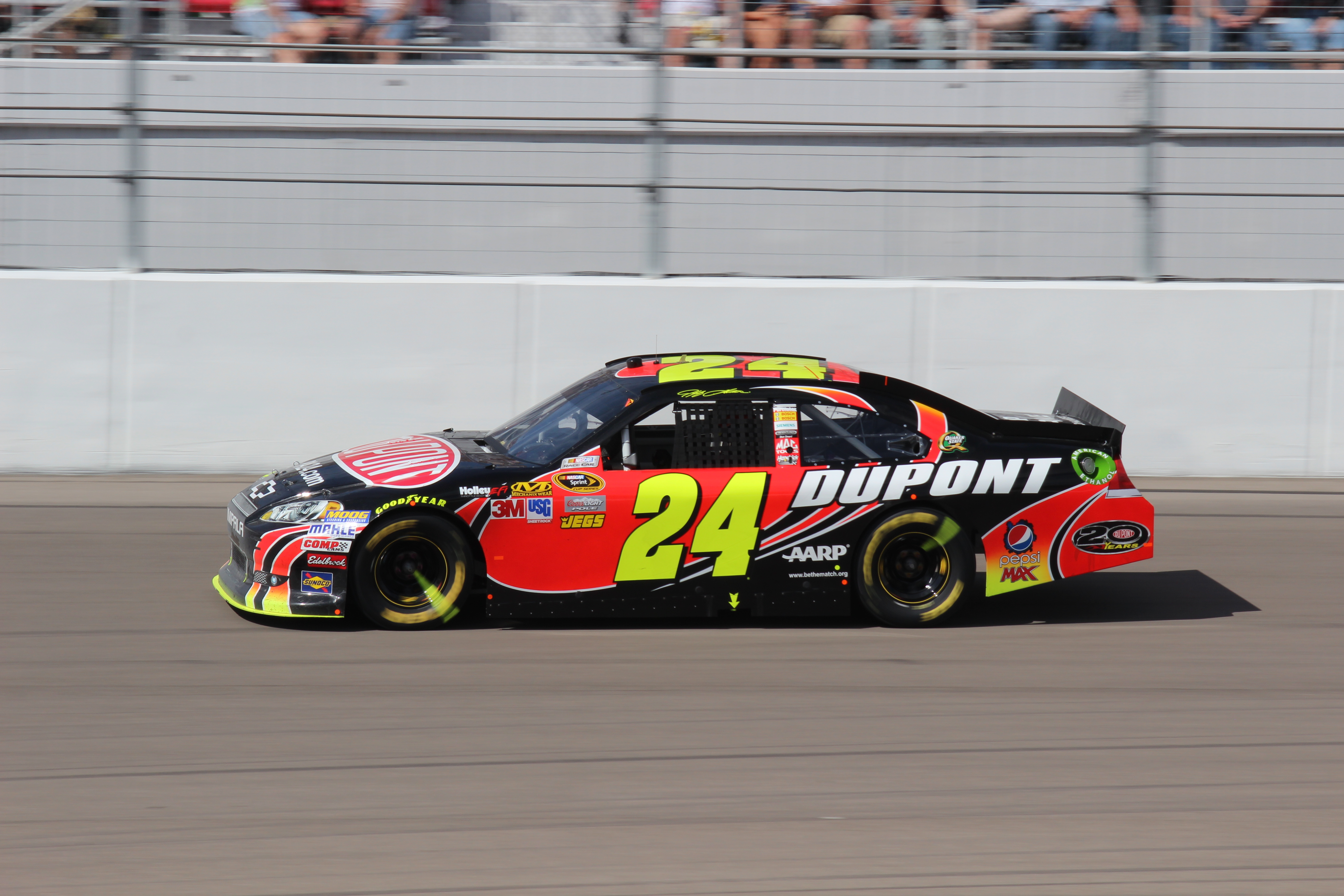
Gordon at the 2012 Kobalt Tools 400

At Pocono, Gordon took advantage of teammate Jimmie Johnson's right-rear tire failure on a late restart just immediately before an expected large thunderstorm rained onto the track thus giving him his 86th NASCAR Sprint Cup victory and his 6th at Pocono (Gordon's victory at Pocono in 2007 was also rained out), breaking the record for most wins at the track, which was previously shared with Bill Elliott. This was the first time since 2007 that Gordon had consecutive seasons with at least one win. At Atlanta, pit strategy put the 24 team in the hunt for a victory, but Gordon couldn't muster past the 11 of Denny Hamlin and wound up in second. At the end of the race, Gordon said that he wished he had "moved him out of the way" to win.

The following week at Richmond, despite troubles early in the race that mired him a lap down, Gordon rallied to finish second to Clint Bowyer, and made his 8th Chase for the Sprint Cup. At Chicagoland, Gordon started 19th and raced his way up to the 4th position, but on Lap 188 Gordon's throttle became stuck, sending him crashing into the turn 1 wall. He would then finish 35th, the tenth time in the 2012 season that he finished 21st or lower.

At the November Phoenix race, Gordon was running near the front until Bowyer again made contact and forced him into the wall. Gordon then cut a tire when trying to retaliate and was penalized with a black-flag for both his attempt at retaliation and failing to come down pit road to fix his tire. In reply to the black-flag Gordon retaliated by intentionally wrecking Bowyer, collecting Joey Logano and Aric Almirola in the process thus ending Bowyer's hopes to win the Cup title. The two crews began brawling while a furious Bowyer climbed out of his car. Bowyer frantically sprinted to Gordon's hauler, but he was restrained by officials just in front of Gordon. Both drivers along with crew chiefs Alan Gustafson and Brian Pattie were summoned to the Oval Office. Gordon was fined $100,000, docked 25 points, and placed on probation until December 31 while Gustafson was fined $50,000 for failing to take control of the 24 crew.

He recovered from his penalty by winning the season finale Ford EcoBoost 400 the next week for his 87th Sprint Cup victory of his career. Ironically, Bowyer finished in second-place behind Gordon. It was Gordon's (and Hendrick Motorsports') first win at Homestead-Miami Speedway, and heading into the 2013 season, leaves Kentucky Speedway as the only Sprint Cup track where Gordon has not won at least one race. In victory lane Gordon gave his public apology for his behavior at Phoenix but maintained that NASCAR should have tried to handle he and Bowyer's year-long feud before the Phoenix race. Gordon's victory also marked the end of a 20-year partnership with sponsor DuPont Automotive Finishes, as it would be purchased by The Carlyle Group in 2013 and rebranded as Axalta Coating Systems.

==== 2013: Struggles and Martinsville win ====
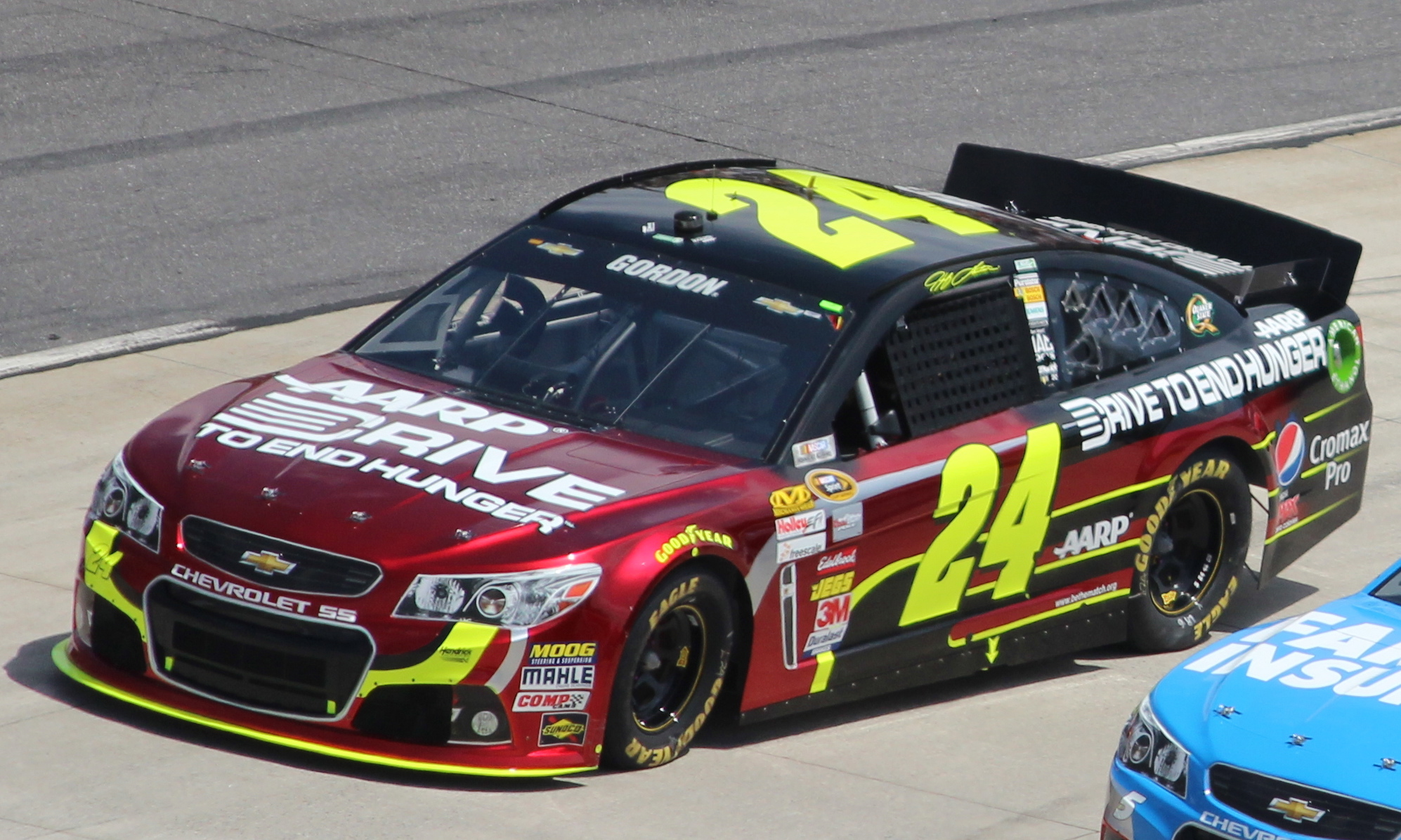
Gordon competing in the 2013 STP Gas Booster 500 at Martinsville Speedway

Gordon's 2013 season started with a crash in the Sprint Unlimited on lap 15. He qualified second for the Daytona 500 and led the first 31 laps. However, he had trouble with his car's engine and water temperatures rising, the former exceeding 240 degrees, throughout the race and would end up finishing 20th after he lost drafting help near the end of the race. He rebounded at Phoenix, finishing ninth, but then had a 25th-place finish at Las Vegas. At Bristol, he cut a tire while leading late in the race, collecting second-place Matt Kenseth in the ensuing crash. However he managed an 11th-place position in Fontana after experiencing problems in a crash in the early stages of the race, forcing him to drop down to 28th. However, later he had a good pace and managed to resurface in top 20. His next top-five finish was a third-place finish at Martinsville, finishing behind Jimmie Johnson and Clint Bowyer.

In the NRA 500 at Texas, Gordon led 15 laps, but the right-front hub broke on his car, and finished 38th. In Gordon's 700th consecutive start, the Bojangles' Southern 500, Gordon finished 3rd, marking his 300th career top-5 finish. In the Coca-Cola 600, on lap 324, Gordon was involved in a crash with Mark Martin and Aric Almirola, which brought out the red flag. At Dover, Gordon finished 3rd, tying David Pearson for third all-time in top-five finishes with 301. In the Quicken Loans 400 at Michigan, Gordon was involved in a crash with Bobby Labonte on lap 6, but eventually returned to the race. Gordon then fell five spots, and finished 39th. At Sonoma, early in the race, Gordon opted to pit as rain was arriving, but reached pit road as officials raised the yellow flag, and was forced to restart at the end of the line in 39th. However, Gordon was able to reach second by lap 77, and led the field two laps later, and by the time the caution was flown, Gordon led four laps. With ten laps left, Gordon was in third, and after passing Juan Pablo Montoya, finished the race in second behind Martin Truex Jr. for his eighth straight top ten finish at Sonoma.

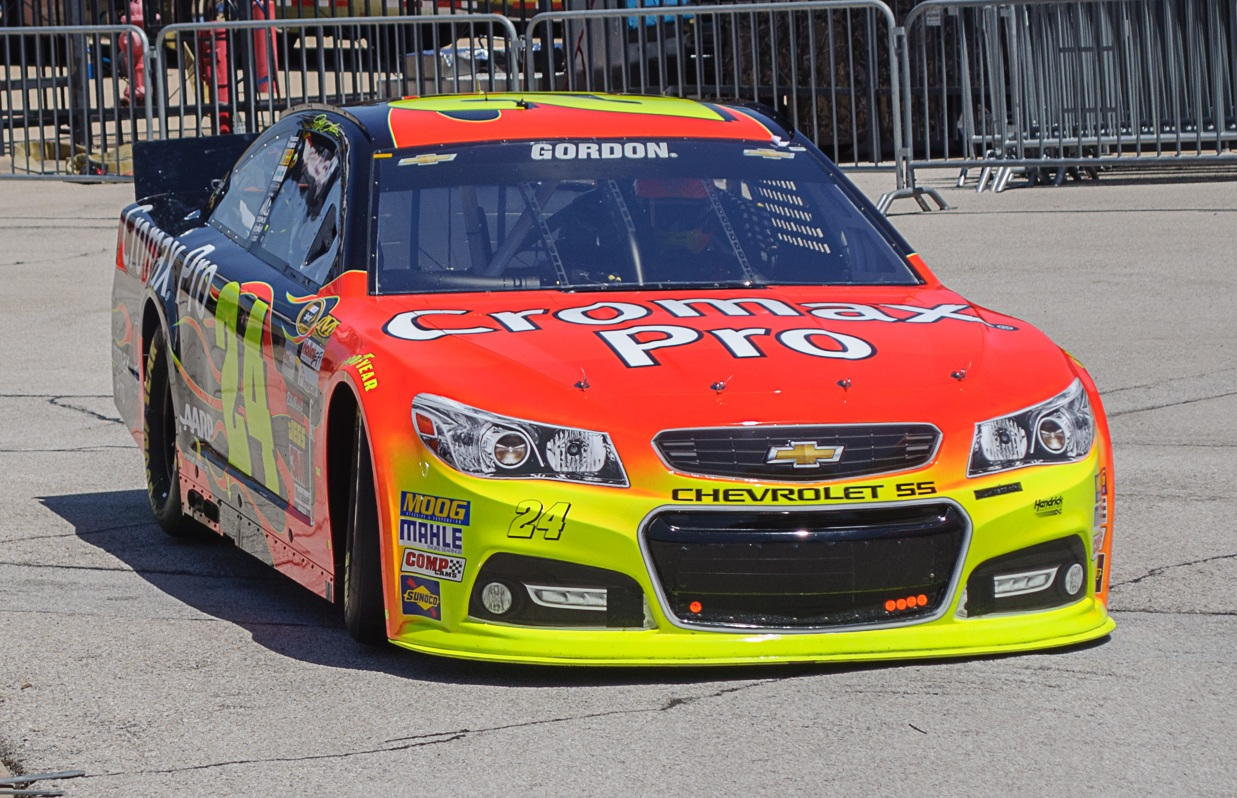
Gordon during practice for the 2013 NRA 500 at Texas Motor Speedway

Gordon had another top ten with an eighth-place finish at Kentucky. However, the following week at Daytona, Gordon was running well until he was caught up in a crash with Denny Hamlin, Matt Kenseth and A. J. Allmendinger in the tri-oval on lap 149, leaving him with a 34th-place finish. He rebounded, though, with a tenth-place finish at New Hampshire and a seventh-place finish at Indianapolis.

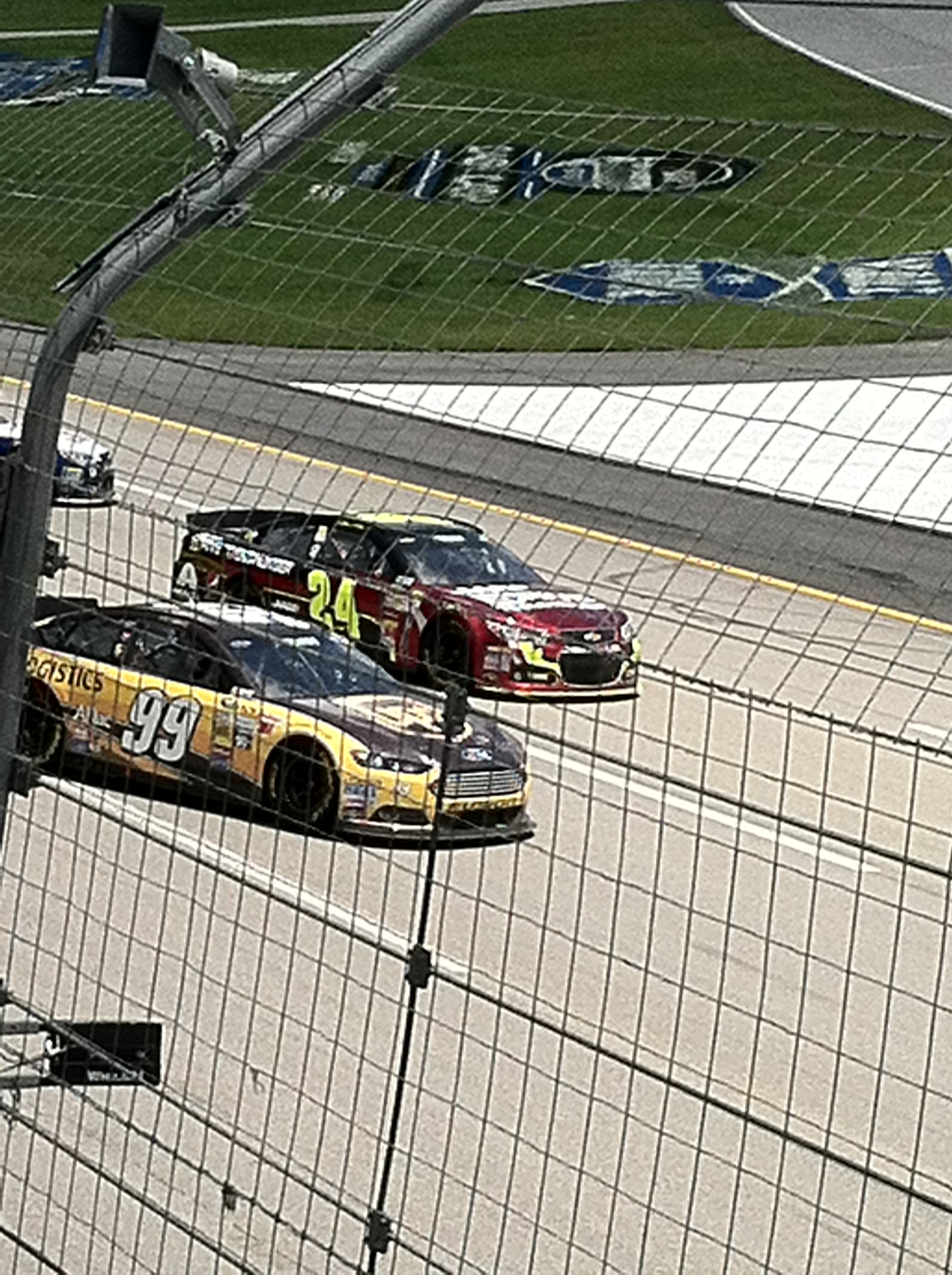
Gordon during a red flag at the Quaker State 400 at Kentucky Speedway

At the return to Pocono in August, Gordon ran his 42nd start at the track on his 42nd birthday, and almost became the second driver of the season to win on his birthday, after Matt Kenseth had done so at Las Vegas. Gordon started deep in the field, in 22nd-place, and took the lead from teammate Kasey Kahne with seven laps remaining. It looked like he was going to win, but a caution caused by Matt Kenseth spinning out erased the lead Gordon had built up on Kahne. Gordon restarted on the inside with two laps remaining, and battled Kahne side-by-side until Kahne cleared him past the tunnel turn, forcing Gordon to settle for second (by coincidence, Kurt Busch, who finished third behind Gordon, was celebrating his 35th birthday). Had Gordon won, it would have been a reversal of the rain-shortened August Pocono race of the previous year, as Gordon had won that race with crew chief Alan Gustafson celebrating his 37th birthday.

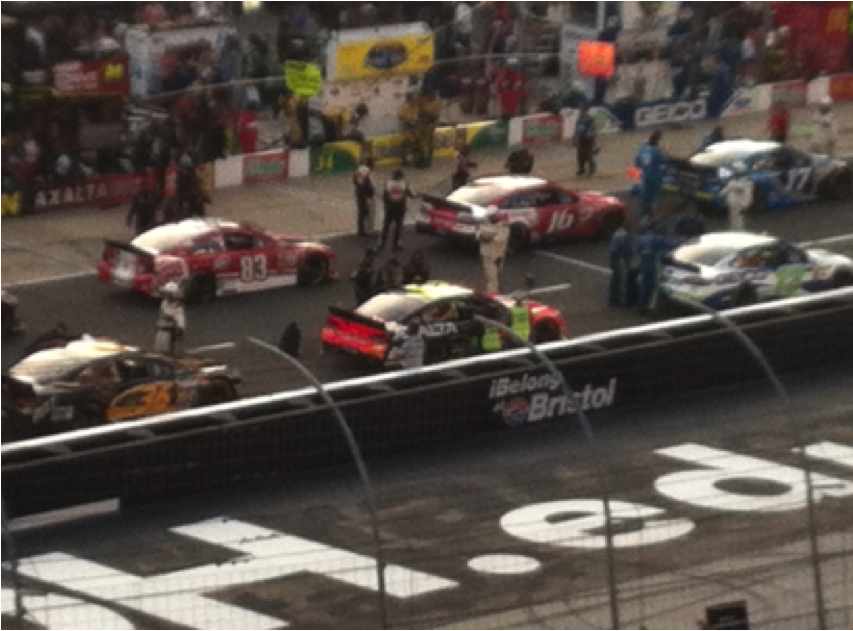
Gordon's car sitting on pit road prior to the start of the Irwin Tools Night Race

In the Cheez-It 355 at The Glen, on lap 14, Gordon was forced off course and slammed into the wall; Gordon finished 36th. In qualifying for the Federated Auto Parts 400, Gordon set a track record with a lap speed of 130.599 mph (210.179 km/h) and a time of 20.674 seconds for his first pole of 2013 and fifth at Richmond, breaking the tie with Mark Martin for most poles at the track among active drivers. Gordon's winning a pole in 21 consecutive seasons set a NASCAR record. However, despite finishing 8th, Gordon was winless and was knocked out of the Chase initially by finishing one point behind Joey Logano. However, on September 13, it was announced that Gordon would be added into the Chase after it was found that Logano's team had collaborated with David Gilliland's team for Gilliland to give up a spot to Logano so that Logano could secure his tenth-place point position over Gordon. This marked the first time the Chase field comprised more than 12 drivers.

After finishing 6th in the GEICO 400, in the Sylvania 300, Gordon was in contention for the lead, but slid past his pit box by the length of the splitters, and was forced to reverse back into his stall, causing him to fall behind to 22nd; Gordon finished 15th. At the Bank of America 500, Gordon won the pole with a lap speed of 194.308 mph (312.708 km/h) for his ninth career Charlotte pole, the second most in track history. Gordon finished 7th in the event. At the Goody's Headache Relief Shot 500, Gordon took the lead from Kenseth with 21 laps to go, and won his first race of 2013, and first at Martinsville since 2005. This broke a 32-race winless streak for Gordon. In the AAA Texas 500, Gordon's left front tire blew on lap 74, and collided with the wall, damaging the right side. Gordon finished 38th, and his third position in the points standings dropped to sixth. Gordon ended the season with a career-low eight top-five finishes, tying the amount he had in 2005, but his sixth-place points finish was the highest since 2009.

==== 2014: Return to Championship form ====
At NASCAR's Media Day in Daytona on February 13, Gordon opened up the possibility of retiring after the 2014 season in the event he won the championship, and stated that he is "probably more serious (than joking). If that (fifth title) happened, that would be all the reasons I need to say, 'This is it. I'm done.' Go out on a high note." Gordon later recanted that statement in an interview with talk show host Larry King, during an appearance on Larry King Now taped from Auto Club Speedway.

The 2014 season began in the Sprint Unlimited, in which Gordon was collected in a nine-car crash on the sixth lap of segment two. Gordon started the season with a fourth-place finish in the Daytona 500. In the following races at Phoenix, Las Vegas and Bristol, Gordon finished fifth, ninth and seventh, and was the only driver to finish in the top ten in every race up to the Bristol race; the four top tens to start the season is a career-best. In the Auto Club 400, Gordon was penalized for speeding on pit road, along with trouble with a pit entrance warning light, but later managed to take the lead on lap 106; Jimmie Johnson later became the leader, with Gordon following. Despite leading by .720 seconds by lap 178, and Gordon starting to suffer from a vibration with 15 laps to go, Johnson's flat tire with six laps remaining allowed Gordon to take the lead, but Clint Bowyer's spin with two laps left and the ensuing pit stop relegated Gordon to seventh. Gordon finished 13th after a green-white-checker finish. At Texas, a caution with two laps remaining led to Gordon taking only two tires, and despite leading on the restart, Gordon was passed by Joey Logano on the final lap, and finished second. However, Gordon managed to take the points lead after the race, his first time leading the standings since May 2009. In the Toyota Owners 400, Gordon led a race-high 173 laps, but finished second to Logano, marking his seventh top ten in nine races, tied with Matt Kenseth for the most.

At Kansas, Gordon claimed the lead late in the race after Brad Keselowski pitted, and defeated Kevin Harvick by 0.112 seconds for his 89th career victory. During the Coca-Cola 600 weekend, Gordon complained of back spasms, and skipped final practice; Regan Smith was tabbed to run in the event Gordon needed to be substituted, but Gordon ran the full 600 miles, finishing seventh.

Entering the Brickyard 400, the twenty-year anniversary of his first win in the 1994 race, the day was declared "Jeff Gordon Day" by Indianapolis mayor Greg Ballard. Gordon passed teammate Kasey Kahne with 17 laps to go to win, breaking a tie with teammate Jimmie Johnson for most wins in the event, and tied with former Formula One driver Michael Schumacher for the most wins at Indianapolis. The following week at the Gobowling.com 400, Gordon led a race-high 63 laps, reaching 24,000 career laps led, including being the first driver to lead 1,000 total laps at Pocono, and finished sixth.

In qualifying for the Cheez-It at The Glen, Gordon won his first pole of 2014 with a lap at 129.466 mph (208.355 km/h). The pole was his third at Watkins Glen International, 75th overall and extended his record of consecutive pole-winning seasons to 22 years. During the race, Gordon led the first 29 laps, and was running second when his car lost power after 40 laps; Gordon would finish 34th. The following week, Gordon won the pole for the Pure Michigan 400 with a lap time of 34.857 seconds and speed of 206.558 mph (332.423 km/h), three-tenths of a second faster than the previous track record set by Harvick. The speed would also be the seventh-fastest in Cup Series history. In the race, Gordon held off Harvick for his first win at Michigan since 2001. On September 28, Gordon claimed his 4th win of the year by winning the AAA 400 at Dover, his 92nd of his career and his first at the track since 2001.

Returning to Texas for the AAA Texas 500, Gordon was involved in a controversial late race incident. He and Brad Keselowski were racing along with Jimmie Johnson for the win with a handful of laps left when Keselowski tried to shoot between Johnson and Gordon, which cut Gordon's left rear tire and spun him out. Gordon fell to 29th, while Keselowski would finish third. Following the race, Gordon verbally confronted Keselowski in pit road over the incident with both drivers being surrounded by their pit crews. However, it escalated into a brawl due to Keselowski being shoved from behind by Harvick, who had also battled with Keselowski in the final laps. The brawl ended up involving the crew chiefs of both teams as well as other members from Kahne, Danica Patrick and Paul Menard's teams. Both Gordon and Keselowski sustained facial cuts. At Phoenix, Gordon finished 2nd to Harvick, but Newman edged him out for the fourth and final championship spot by one point to transfer to the final four in contention for the championship. Gordon won the pole for the final race at Homestead, and led a race-high 161 laps, but the decision to pit with 13 laps to go relegated him to 24th, and he finished 10th. The finish marked his 454th top-ten, surpassing Mark Martin for second in all-time top tens, behind Richard Petty's 712. After the season ended, Gordon finished sixth in points. This would be the 3rd time that Gordon would have lost a championship because of the Chase points system, but this time, an elimination format. Had the Chase not existed, and if the old points system was still around, Jeff Gordon would have been the 3rd driver in NASCAR history to win 7 Cup Series championships, joining Richard Petty and Dale Earnhardt. Championships 5 and 6 would have occurred in 2004 and 2007. He would have won his 7th title by 149 points over Joey Logano. Gordon, along with Austin Dillon, were the only drivers in 2014 to finish every race.

==== 2015: Final season ====
Gordon leads the field to the green flag at the Daytona 500

On January 22, 2015, Gordon announced that 2015 would be his last season as a full-time driver, but did not rule out retirement entirely. On January 29, Gordon stated he does not plan to run any more Daytona 500s after 2015.

During the 2015 season, various tracks performed acts in tribute to Gordon. Atlanta Motor Speedway president Ed Clark gave him a Bandolero racing car with the names of his children, Ella and Leo, inscribed on it; at the following race, Las Vegas Motor Speedway's president Chris Powell gave him a customized blackjack table. For the Food City 500 at Bristol, Ella and Leo were the race's grand marshals. On April 29, Gordon announced that he would be serving as the pace car driver for the Indianapolis 500, the same day as the Coca-Cola 600. At Sonoma and Kentucky, he was given an 18 litres (4.8 US gal) wine bottle and 96 bottles of bourbon whiskey, respectively. For November's Quicken Loans Race for Heroes 500, Phoenix International Raceway was renamed "Jeff Gordon Raceway". For the season-ending race, Gordon's Hendrick teammates painted their car numbers with the same yellow that Gordon had used on his cars.

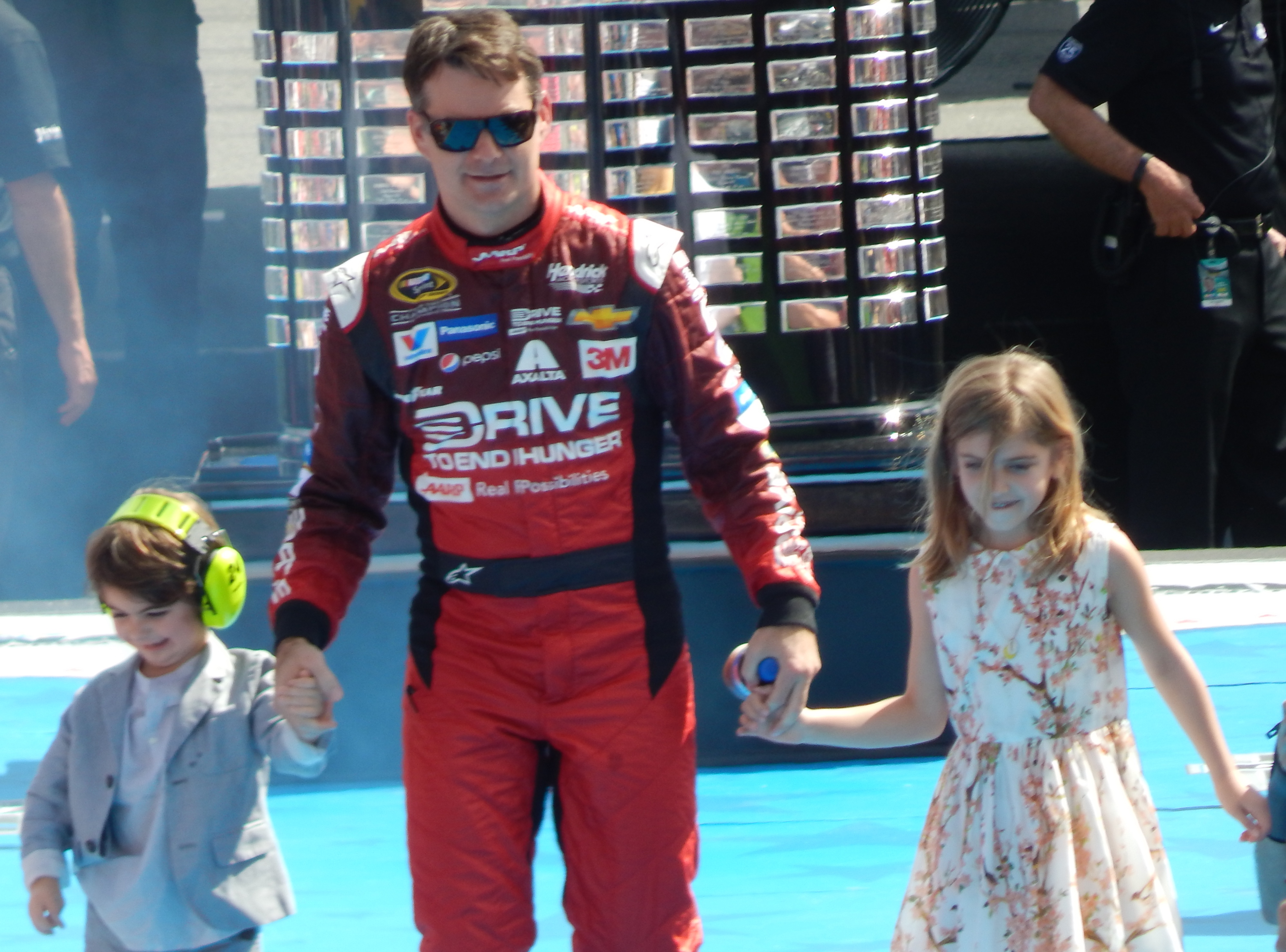
Gordon with his children prior to the Daytona 500

Gordon started the season by winning the pole for the Daytona 500. Despite leading 87 laps, Gordon began slipping, and crashed on the final lap, finishing 33rd. In the next race at Atlanta, Gordon, along with twelve other drivers, were unable to complete a qualifying lap due to inspection of the car's rear camber exceeding the length of the first round of qualifying, and as a result, he was relegated to 35th. In the race, he was clipped by Jamie McMurray with 70 laps to go, sending Gordon into a concrete inside wall, a few feet short of the SAFER barrier, but was not injured; Gordon finished 41st. In the wake of Kyle Busch's injury in Daytona's Xfinity race the week before after colliding with an unprotected wall, Gordon stated, "I don't think we can say any more after Kyle's incident at Daytona. Everybody knows we have to do something, and it should have been done a long time ago. All we can do now is hope they do it as fast as they possibly can."

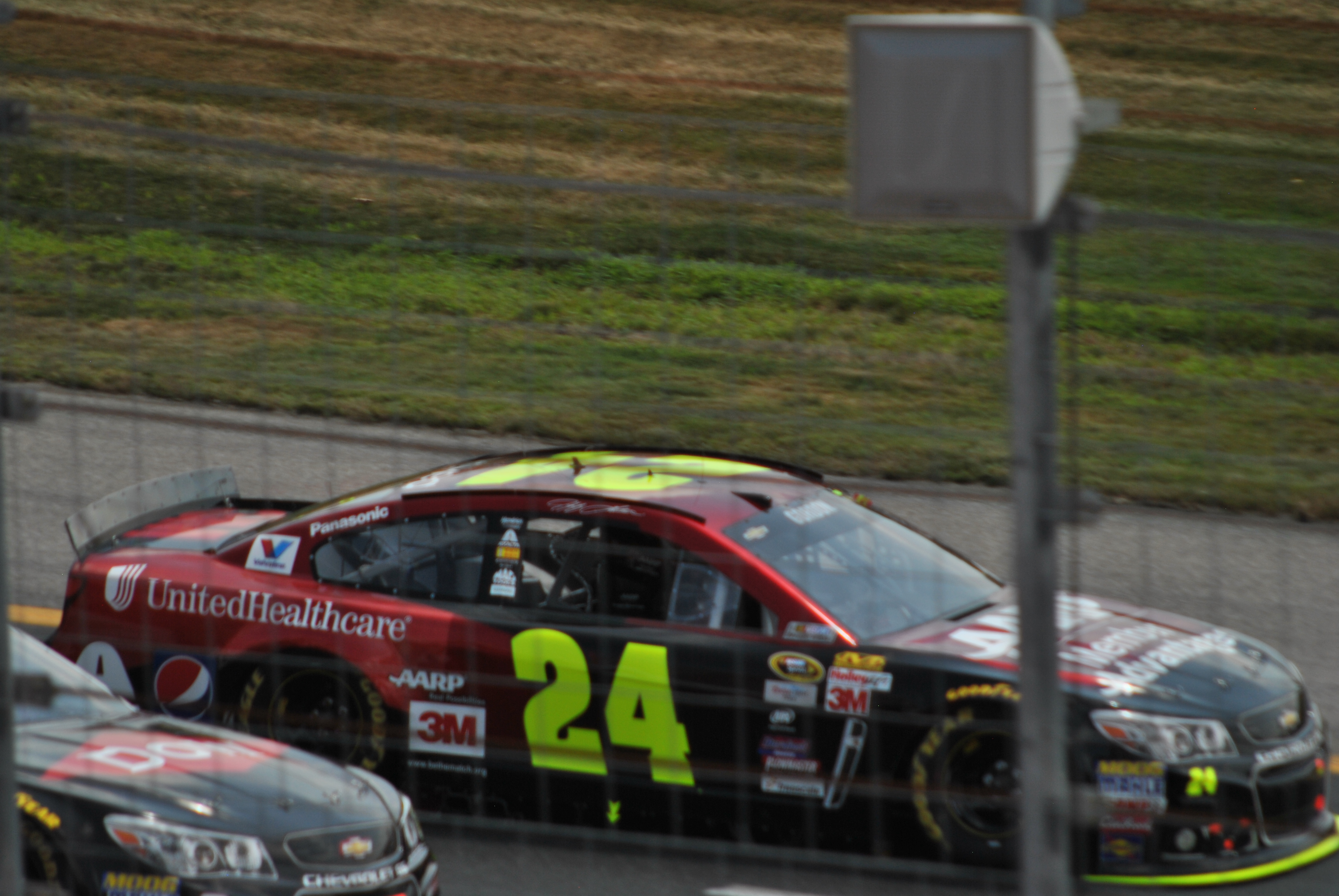
Gordon racing at New Hampshire Motor Speedway in 2015

In qualifying for the Kobalt 400, Gordon won his second pole of the year and first ever at Las Vegas with a track-record speed of 194.679 miles per hour (313.305 km/h) and time of 27.738 seconds, but his car was so badly damaged following contact with Danica Patrick during final practice that he needed to use his backup car and started the race at the rear of the field. After rear-ending Jeb Burton, he never recovered and finished one lap down in 18th. During the year, Gordon won the pole at the two Talladega races (GEICO 500 and CampingWorld.com 500), completing a Hendrick sweep at plate tracks in 2015. At the Goody's Headache Relief Shot 500, Gordon capitalized on Team Penske drivers Brad Keselowski and Joey Logano's crashes (the latter caused by Matt Kenseth intentionally, making Kenseth the second Joe Gibbs Racing driver in five years to miss the Texas race because of intentionally crashing another driver after Kyle Busch wrecked Ron Hornaday in the 2011 Trucks race at Texas) to claim his 93rd and final career Cup victory; the win advanced him to the Championship Four at Homestead. In the 2015 Ford EcoBoost 400, Gordon qualified fifth, the second-best of the Championship Four, and led nine laps. As the race continued, Gordon battled a poor-handling car to a sixth-place finish.

==== 2016: Reserve role in the No. 88 ====
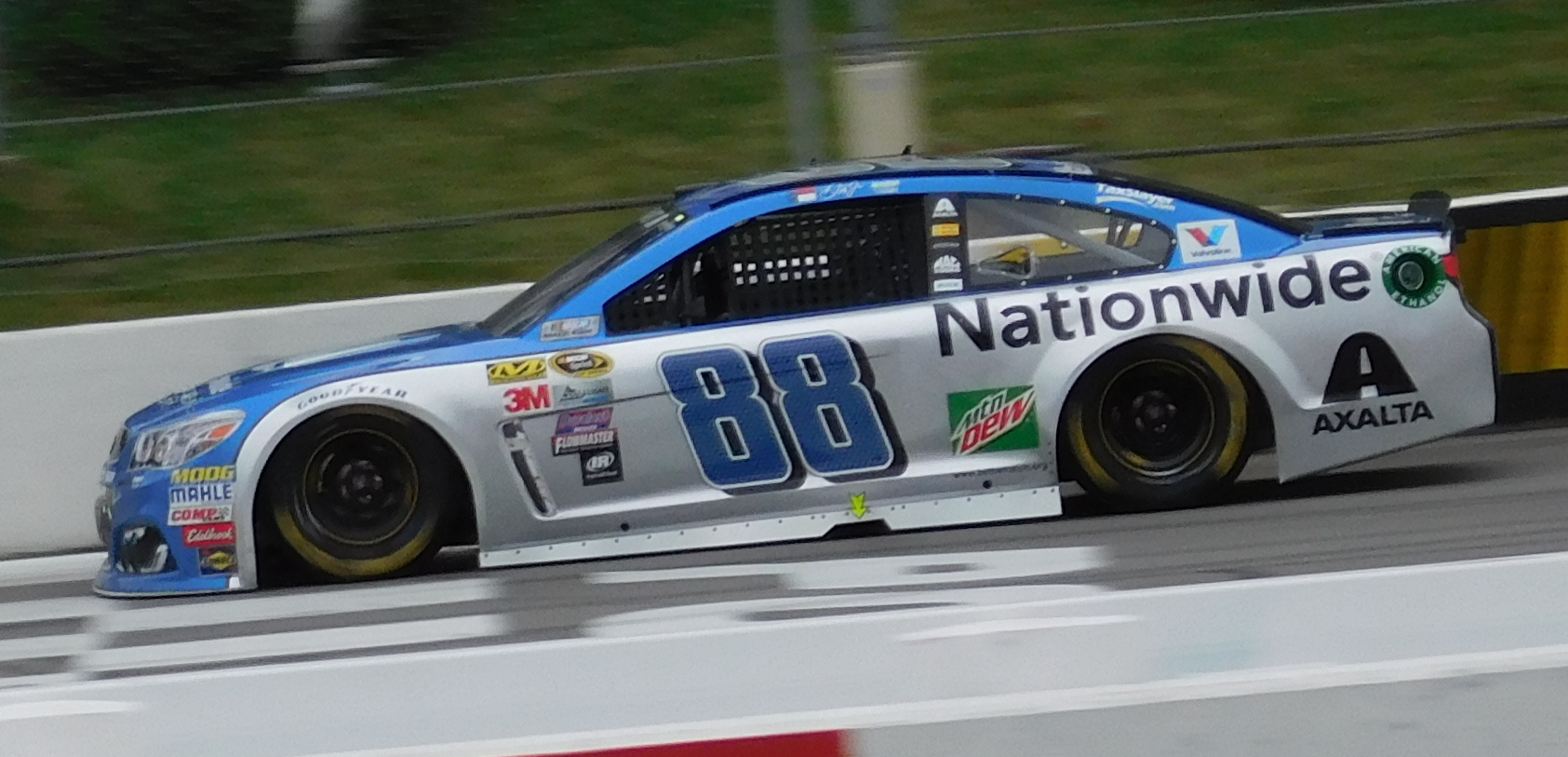
Gordon driving the No. 88 in the 2016 Pennsylvania 400

On July 15, 2016, Hendrick Motorsports announced Gordon, having finished his commitments to Fox Sports for the 2016 season at the Toyota/Save Mart 350 at the end of June, would be the No. 88 team reserve driver for the Brickyard 400 following Dale Earnhardt Jr. being sidelined with concussion-type symptoms a day earlier, forcing him out of the car for the rest of the 2016 season. Five days later, Hendrick officially announced Gordon would fill in for Earnhardt at Indianapolis and Pocono. In Gordon's return to Indy, his first Cup race in 245 days, he qualified 21st and fell as far as 26th and a lap down. Eventually, he finished 13th.

Gordon reached his 800th career start at Watkins Glen International, becoming the ninth driver to reach 800 starts. Of the other eight drivers, five are in the NASCAR Hall of Fame and all but one have won a major race – either one of the four legs of the Grand Slam or Indianapolis. Gordon's 802nd start was at the Bojangles' Southern 500 in Darlington on September 4, as he was unavailable for the Pure Michigan 400 (Earnhardt's Xfinity Series driver Alex Bowman, who drove at Loudon when Gordon was on vacation, drove at Michigan); he made further starts at the Richmond, Dover and Martinsville races. He recorded his best finish of the season at Martinsville with a sixth-place run.

== Team ==
=== Numbers ===
Gordon has claimed that his favorite number is 16, and that he originally wanted to use it in NASCAR; however, the No. 16 belonged to Roush Racing driver Wally Dallenbach Jr. when Gordon entered the Cup Series. Additionally, Gordon's stepfather John Bickford stated that Gordon's number was supposed to be 46, but when he attempted to license the number, Paramount Pictures already held the trademarks for No. 46, which had been used in the movie Days of Thunder.

With a win in the 1994 Coca-Cola 600 at Charlotte Motor Speedway, Gordon became the first driver to take the No. 24 to victory lane. He remained the only driver to do so until William Byron earned his first series victory in the 2020 Coke Zero Sugar 400 at Daytona International Speedway; (Note: Prior to the No. 24 team's victory in the 2020 Coke Zero Sugar 400, Chase Elliott and William Byron drove the number to victories in the Daytona qualifying races in 2017 and 2020 respectively. Although championship points were awarded to the top ten finishers, these victories do not count towards the all-time NASCAR Cup Series wins list.) ironically Byron was 24 days younger than Gordon was when they earned their first career wins. Throughout the history of the NASCAR Cup Series, the No. 24 has been used by 65 drivers; since Gordon's retirement the number has been used by two drivers— Chase Elliott and William Byron.

Gordon drove the No. 88 during his role as a reserve driver in 2016, splitting the car with Alex Bowman. Dale Earnhardt Jr. returned to the car for his final Cup Series season in 2017. Throughout the history of the NASCAR Cup Series, the No. 88 has been used by 96 drivers.

=== Manufacturer ===
Gordon drove Chevrolet race cars during his entire Cup Series career. On December 3, 2015, Gordon received the first Chevrolet Lifetime Achievement Award at the NASCAR NMPA Myers Brothers Awards Luncheon.

=== Sponsorship and paint ===
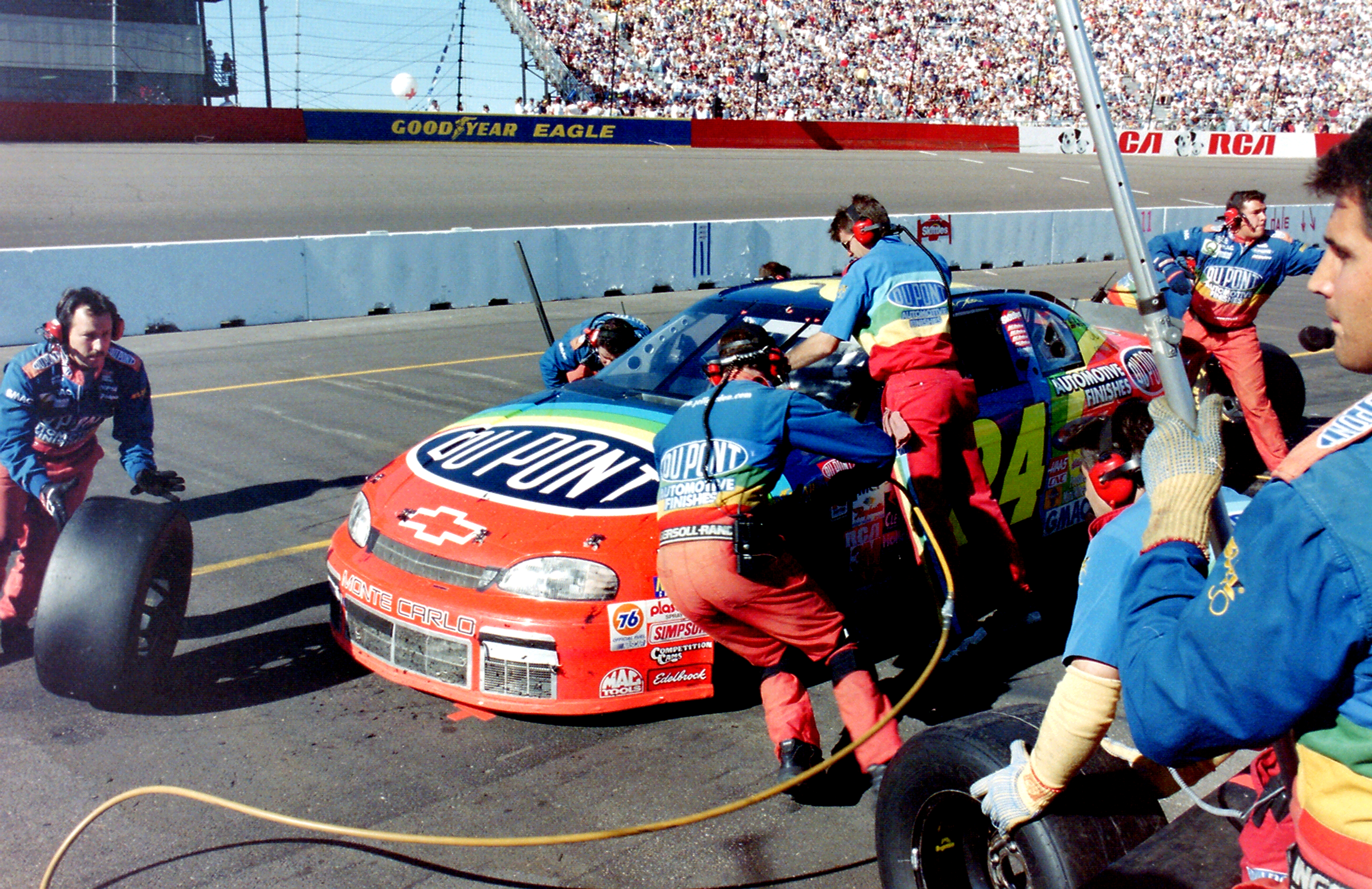
The Rainbow Warriors doing a pit stop in 1997

From 1993 to 2000, Gordon carried a rainbow scheme, designed by NASCAR artist Sam Bass, which was meant to represent DuPont's image as a "company of color". Bass had initially designed the car with a black middle instead of the blue paint that was later specially created for Gordon. Hendrick Motorsports painted a few sample cars for DuPont officials to review. Due to the resulting scheme, Gordon and his team came to be referred to as "The Rainbow Warriors".

In 1997, Gordon signed a long-term contract with Pepsi. Every year Gordon had driven a car with the Pepsi scheme (usually at a night race, particularly the Coke Zero 400).

In 2001, Gordon debuted a new scheme designed by Bass, which kept a blue base but changed the rainbow pattern to flames. The rainbow scheme would return later in Gordon's career, for the 2004 Nextel All-Star Challenge and the 2015 Irwin Tools Night Race. In 2002, Gordon raced with a special scheme in honor of DuPont's 200th Anniversary. In 2006, Gordon acquired a new sponsor, Nicorette. In 2007, Gordon increased his partnership with Nicorette, and ran the paint scheme in 4 races. At the Coca-Cola 600 in 2007, Gordon ran a scheme honoring the United States Department of Defense. Later that year, at Talladega's fall race, Gordon had a fan design contest, and Gordon ultimately won the race. Gordon occasionally ran a paint scheme that supported a different type of DuPont paint such as Cromax Pro.

Gordon announced that the primary scheme of the DuPont No. 24 Chevrolet was to change for 2009 and beyond on the QVC show For Race Fans Only. The 2009 scheme kept the flames format but the colors were radically changed to red and orange flames on a black base color. The new 2009 DuPont paint scheme was unveiled on NBC's Today show. In 2009, the National Guard signed a contract with Gordon, replacing Nicorette. The National Guard was the primary sponsor on Gordon's car for 6–8 races per season through 2010.

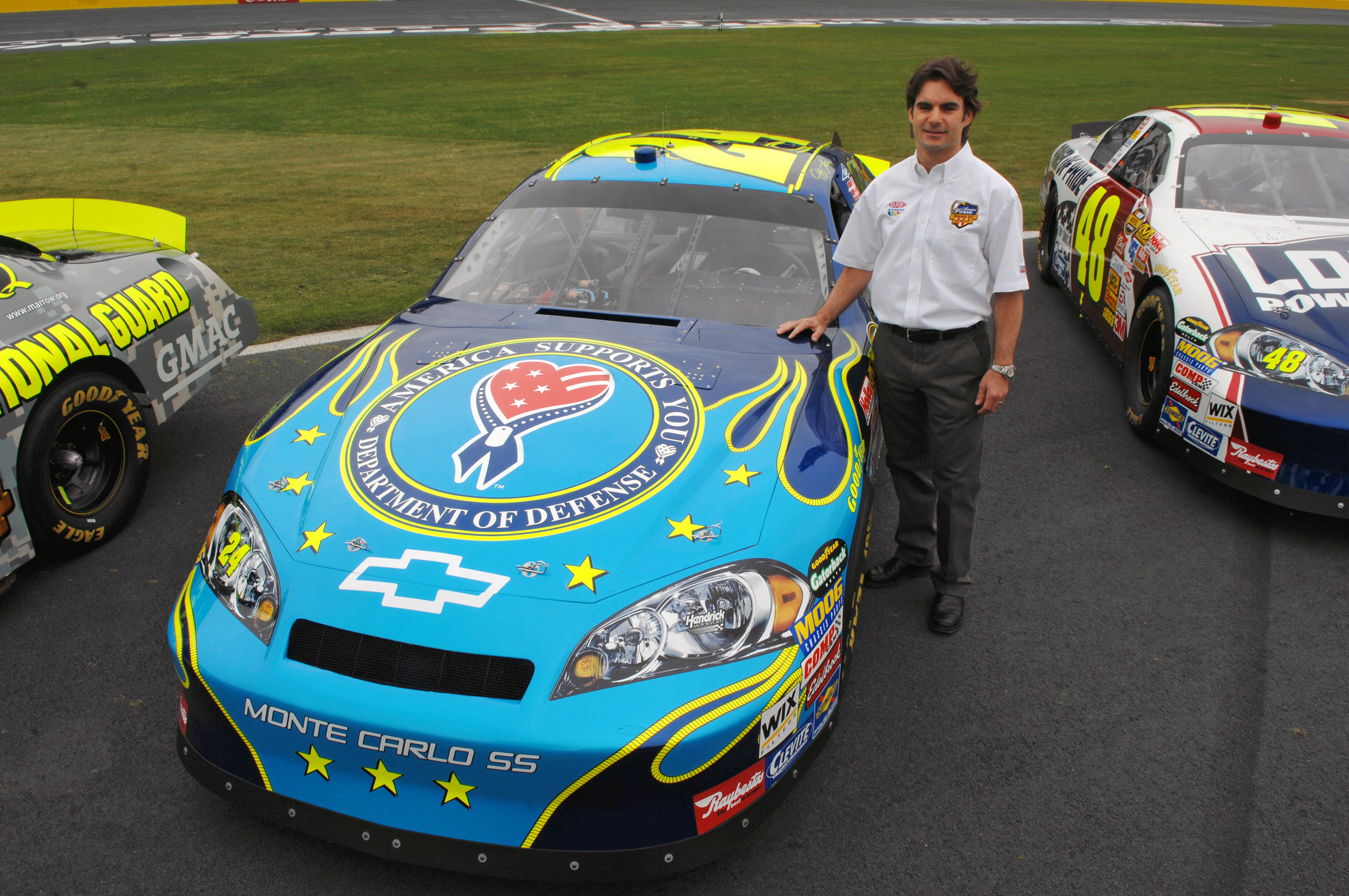
Gordon with the Department of Defense paint scheme run at the 2007 Coca-Cola 600

Hendrick Motorsports owner, Rick Hendrick, said in November 2009 that he is working on signing a contract extension with DuPont, Gordon's primary sponsor since the beginning of his career. DuPont's current contract with Gordon expired at the end of 2010, and Hendrick said he wants it to be Gordon's primary sponsor for the rest of his career. In 2010, reports surfaced that Hendrick Motorsports was in talks with Walmart to be a sponsor for the No. 24 car, but the deal never materialized.

Occasionally, a one-race sponsor steps in to sponsor Gordon's car for one race, therefore he has sometimes carried different paint. Examples are The Lost World: Jurassic Park in the 1997 Winston, Star Wars: Episode I – The Phantom Menace and NASCAR Racers in 1999, Snoopy in the 2000 Brickyard 400, and a Superman theme in 1999 and in 2006 to promote Superman Returns. Gordon ran a Megatron scheme at Charlotte to promote the movie Transformers: Revenge of the Fallen that was soon to come out on June 24, 2009.

In October 2010, Hendrick Motorsports announced a scaled-down three-year extension of its sponsorship agreement with DuPont: DuPont was Gordon's primary sponsor for 14 races, with AARP, through its "Drive to End Hunger" program, picking up 22 of the remaining races and long-term sponsor Pepsi continuing as primary sponsor for 2 races. In 2012 at Bristol, online game developer Zynga teamed with AARP and Gordon ran a FarmVille-themed scheme. Gordon also had a Teenage Mutant Ninja Turtles paint scheme on his car for the Bank of America 500 at Charlotte Motor Speedway on October 13.

In 2013, DuPont Performance Coatings was sold to Carlyle Group and became Axalta Coating Systems, which ran with Gordon for 14 races during the season. In February 2014, it was announced that Gordon's car would have a Texas A&M Engineering paint scheme at the Duck Commander 500 at Texas. During the race weekend, Axalta arranged an event for more than 20 engineering students from the school, as the company's CEO is Texas A&M University alumnus Charles Shaver. In 2015, Gordon ran with a Penn State University scheme with Pennsylvania-based Axalta as sponsor at the Axalta "We Paint Winners" 400.

On June 17, 2014, Hendrick Motorsports announced that Panasonic would serve as a primary sponsor with Gordon for two races at Sonoma and Atlanta through its Toughbook brand, and as an associate sponsor for the remaining events, on an annual basis through 2016. On August 12, Hendrick announced 3M would serve as a primary sponsor for 11 races and an associate sponsor for the remainder annually until 2017. That sponsorship continued with the No. 24 team and his successor Chase Elliott.

For his final scheduled race, Gordon unveiled a new scheme on NASCAR Race Hub. The car featured the Axalta flames, but with a silver base instead of black.

When Gordon filled in for Dale Earnhardt Jr. in the No. 88 at Indianapolis, Watkins Glen, and Bristol, the car was sponsored by Axalta, with the yellow and red "Solar Flare" livery that many fans online believe is based on a one-off 2003 NASCAR Busch Series Daytona paint scheme and the black tail panel used by Earnhardt, influenced by Earnhardt's 2001 Rolex 24 drive for Corvette Racing.

Other races with Gordon as a reserve driver featured Nationwide Insurance, the main sponsor of the No. 88. The primary Nationwide livery was used at most races, except for Darlington. The already-scheduled 1980 Daytona 500 "Gray Ghost"-inspired livery was used at Darlington. No races with PepsiCo sponsorship for Earnhardt based on the Mountain Dew brand for selected races were driven by Gordon; the primary Mountain Dew liveries are wrapped in vinyl, and not painted, a conflict since Gordon serves in an advisory role for Axalta.
