= Farmville 2: Country Escape =

FarmVille 2: Country Escape
- Developer: Zynga
- Publisher: Zynga (now a subsidiary of Take-Two Interactive)
- Series: FarmVille
- Platforms: iOS, Android, Kindle Fire, Windows Phone, Windows 8, Windows 10
- Release: iOS; April 10, 2014; Android; April 17, 2014; Windows; November 24, 2014
- Genres: Agriculture simulation, strategy
- Modes: Single-player, multiplayer (Co-Op)

FarmVille 2: Country Escape is a free-to-play farming game developed and published by Zynga. It was released globally for iOS and Android on April 17, 2014. Zynga became a wholly owned subsidiary of Take-Two Interactive in 2022. Country Escape was developed as a separate mobile game connected to, but distinct from, the browser-based FarmVille 2.

Unlike the earlier Facebook games, Country Escape was designed specifically for mobile devices and can be played without an internet connection. It also includes an Anonymous Mode that does not require a Facebook account. The game is free to download and includes optional in-game purchases and subscriptions for in-game currency.

== Gameplay ==
FarmVille 2: Country Escape is a farming game in which players grow crops, raise animals, produce goods and expand their farm. Crops and animal products can be processed into other goods using workshops, and completed goods can be sold through order boards and other marketplaces. Completing tasks and Farm Orders awards experience points, which are used to level up and gain access to additional areas and content.

=== Farming and crafting ===
Players grow crops in farm plots by planting and watering them, with crops becoming available for harvest after a set amount of time. Crops and animal products can be used as ingredients or processed into other goods at production buildings known as workshops. For example, wheat can be processed into flour at the Windmill, while milk can be made into butter at the Dairy.

Produced goods can be sold through the Farm Orders board. The game includes several workshops, including the Windmill, Pastry Oven, Dairy, Stovetop and Winery.

=== Progression and farm management ===
Players earn experience points by completing tasks and Farm Orders. Accumulating experience allows the player to level up and gain access to additional content and areas of the farm.

The Farm House is used to manage features including Farmhands, Power Pins, achievements, Prized Animals and the Back Porch. The Back Porch provides storage for workshops, crops, animals and decorations.

The game also includes separate storage systems, including the Barn, Crop Silo and Seaway Storage. Their storage capacities can be increased through upgrades.

=== Exploration and Farmhands ===
Players can send Farmhands to Points of Interest to gather resources. These locations include Grandma's Glade, Pappy's Pond, Merryweather Mine, Mallard Mill and Prosperity Pier. Different locations provide different resources. Grandma's Glade can provide blackberries and chives, while Pappy's Pond can provide trout, bass and mint.

Farmhands have different abilities that can affect the items collected at Points of Interest. Multiple Farmhands can be assigned to an expedition, which takes a fixed amount of time to complete. The game also introduces additional Farmhands through limited-time events.

=== Multiplayer and Co-Op Features ===
The game can be played offline, while an internet connection is required for some online features. Players can join Farm Co-Ops, where members can trade and share items. Players can also use the Farm Stand to buy and sell goods with other players. A social network account is not required to use these social features.

Co-Ops can participate in Boat Club Races, where members complete tasks to earn points and compete against other Co-Ops in a league system. The game also includes other online competitions. County Fair uses weekly leaderboards to rank players and award rewards based on their results. Tiny Tracks pairs players against another farmer in a timed competition.

=== Live operations and monetization ===
FarmVille 2: Country Escape is free to play and includes optional in-game purchases, including purchases of in-game currency. Keys and other currencies can be used to speed up crafting and complete certain tasks, as well as for some other in-game purchases.

The game also features recurring limited-time events. Some events include competitions and leaderboards, with rewards based on a player's position.

== Setting and characters ==
The game is set on a family farm in a coastal location, which the player restores and expands.

Farmhands are characters that can be sent to Points of Interest to gather resources. These locations include Grandma's Glade, Pappy's Pond, Merryweather Mine, Prosperity Pier and Mallard Mill. Different Farmhands can have advantages when assigned to particular Points of Interest. Limited-time events can also award additional Farmhands, including permanent Farmhands as event rewards.

== Development and release ==
=== Background and mobile development ===
In 2014, Zynga released FarmVille 2: Country Escape, which was designed specifically for mobile devices and developed separately from the Facebook version of FarmVille 2. It could be played offline and included an Anonymous Mode that did not require a Facebook account.

=== Release and localization ===
Before its worldwide release, Country Escape was soft launched in selected markets. The game began its worldwide rollout on iOS and Android on April 17, 2014. At launch, it was available in 16 languages.

Versions of the game were also made available for Windows and Windows Phone devices.

=== Post-release updates ===
The game also supports cloud saving, allowing game progress to be synchronized between devices.

In April 2026, Zynga marked the game's 12th anniversary with the Birthday Bounty event, which included in-game rewards and anniversary-themed decorations.

== Reception ==
=== Critical Reviews ===
Reception

Aggregate score
| Aggregator | Score |
|---|---|
| Metacritic | 64/100 |

Review score
| Publication | Score |
|---|---|
| Gamezebo | 70/100 |

FarmVille 2: Country Escape received “mixed or average” reviews according to Metacritic, which assigned the iOS version a score of 64 out of 100 based on four reviews. It was also a part of Apple's Best of 2014 selection.

While noting the game's changes to the social features, Kotaku said that Zynga may have "built the best FarmVille game of the series". TIME described the game as a version of FarmVille designed for portable play. The Los Angeles Times described Country Escape as the first mobile version of the FarmVille franchise and part of Zynga's move toward mobile games.

148Apps gave the game 3.5 out of 5 stars and described it as “brighter and better than the previous installment”, while also noting that it might not appeal to players who did not already enjoy farming games. Gamezebo gave the game 70 out of 100, praising its graphics, animations and touch controls while criticizing the limits placed on farm size and customization.

Zynga promoted Offline Mode as allowing players to play without an internet connection, while Anonymous Mode allowed play without connecting through Facebook. GameSpot also noted both features when the game launched.

=== Commercial Performance ===
Soon after launch, GameSpot reported that the game reached third place among free games on the iTunes App Store and 42nd on its Top Grossing chart. It also entered the top 100 free games on Google Play.

Data analytics platforms like Sensor Tower placed its lifetime downloads in the tens of millions, and the game played a significant role in cementing Zynga's position as a mobile-first developer before the company's acquisition by Take-Two Interactive. The figures covered the game from its 2014 release through the first quarter of 2019.

== Post-release content ==
=== In-Game Events ===
FarmVille 2: Country Escape has regularly featured limited-time events with themed tasks and rewards. Zynga later changed events held near Eagle Eye Eddie to a 14-day schedule. The game's Season Pass was also changed to the same 14-day duration.

=== Anniversary Milestones ===
FarmVille 2: Country Escape was released in 2014 and continued to receive updates and in-game events in subsequent years. In April 2026, Zynga marked the game's 12th anniversary with the Birthday Bounty event.

== Legacy ==
FarmVille 2: Country Escape was developed as a separate mobile entry in the FarmVille series. Unlike the original game, it could be played without a Facebook account and included an offline mode. The original FarmVille, which had launched on Facebook in 2009, was later discontinued in 2020.

The FarmVille series later continued on mobile with FarmVille: Tropic Escape and FarmVille 3. FarmVille 3 was released worldwide in November 2021.
