= FarmVille =

2009 video game

- Developer: Zynga
- Publisher: Zynga
- Engine: Flare3D
- Platforms: Android iOS; Adobe Flash; HTML5
- Release: Facebook: WW: 19 June 2009; HTML: WW: 13 October 2011
- Genre: Simulation
- Modes: Single-player, multiplayer

FarmVille is a series of agriculture-simulation social network games developed and published by Zynga beginning in 2009. It is similar to Happy Farm and Farm Town. Its gameplay involves various aspects of farmland management, such as plowing land, planting, growing, and harvesting crops, harvesting trees and raising livestock. The sequels FarmVille 2 and FarmVille 3 were released in 2012 and 2021.

The game was available as an Adobe Flash application via the social networking website Facebook and Microsoft's MSN Games. It was briefly available as a mobile app for the iPhone, iPod Touch, and iPad in 2010. The game is free to play, but to progress quickly, players are encouraged to spend Farm Cash (in FarmVille) or Farm Bucks (in FarmVille 2), which are purchasable with real-world currency. FarmVille was thus one of the first major freemium games.

After launching on Facebook in 2009, FarmVille became the most popular game on the site, and held that position for over two years. At its peak, in March 2010, the game had 83.76 million monthly active users. Daily active users peaked at 34.5 million. After 2011, the game's popularity declined considerably. By May 2012, it was ranked the seventh-most popular Facebook game. As of April 30, 2016, it had fallen to the 110th-most popular Facebook game as measured by daily active users, while FarmVille 2 had climbed to 42nd place.

On September 27, 2020, Zynga announced that it would discontinue the first FarmVille on Facebook on December 31, 2020, as Facebook was to stop supporting games running on Flash Player—required by FarmVille—on that day. Like FarmVille 2, FarmVille 3 focuses on mobile devices.

== Gameplay ==
Once a player begins a farm, they create a customizable avatar, which can be changed at any point.

One player's customized farm

The player begins with an empty farm and a fixed starting number of Farm Coins, the primary currency in the game. Players earn XP (experience points) for performing certain actions in the game such as plowing land or buying items. At certain XP benchmarks, the player's level rises. As the player obtains more items and progresses through levels, crops and animals become available to them via the "market" where items can be purchased using either Farm Coins or Farm Cash. Farm Cash is earned by leveling up or completing offers, or purchased for real money.

The main way a player earns Farm Coins, the less important of the two in-game currencies, is by harvesting crops or visiting their neighbors. The player does this by paying coins for plowing a unit of land. This readies the land for planting seeds, which are eventually harvested after a set amount of time. How much time it takes a crop to mature, and how much money it yields when harvested, depends on the crop planted and is noted on its entry in the "market" dialog. They wither or are of no use when a crop-specific amount of time elapses equal to 2.5 times the amount of time taken to grow the crop (for example, crops that take 8 hours to grow wither after 2.5×8=20 hours). But players can use Farm Cash (purchasable with real-world cash) to buy an "unwither" to rejuvenate the crops, or use a biplane with "instant grow" to cause crops to be immediately available for harvest. Although the biplane can be purchased with coins, this special feature is available only for Farm Cash. As players level up more, crops with a higher payoff and economy become available. Sometimes a crop needs a permit that costs Farm Cash to be planted.

A player can buy or receive from friends livestock and trees or bushels, such as cherry trees or chickens, which do not wither but become ready for harvest for preset amounts of money a set amount of time from their last harvest. Trees and livestock cannot die.

=== In-game purchases ===
The two main in-game currencies, Farm Coins and Farm Cash (in FarmVille) or Farm Bucks (in FarmVille 2), were available for purchase from Zynga with real-world money. Coins could also be "earned" within the game by completing tasks or selling crops, and could be spent on basic in-game items such as seeds. Farm Cash and Farm Bucks were more difficult to acquire within the game, and could not be earned within the farm's economic system, only by special actions like leveling up or completing tasks. Farm Cash and Farm Bucks provided a route to acquire further in-game items, such as additional animals for the farm, or to acquire in-game resources like animal feed, water, fuel and power, which were otherwise slow or laborious for players to acquire.

=== Social interaction ===
Like most Zynga games, FarmVille incorporated the social networking aspect of Facebook into many areas of gameplay. Contacting other players allowed the player to improve their farm more quickly, by using their help as farmhands or by gaining rewards from helping them. Often the aid of other players was a substitute for Farm Cash, the game's purchasable in-game currency, giving players an effective choice between spamming their friends with FarmVille messages and requests, or paying real-world cash. FarmVille had allowed players to add neighbors that are not Facebook friends, thus allowing the player to have many neighbors at hand. Players invited friends or other players that were not Facebook friends to be their neighbors, allowing them to perform five actions on each other's farms per day by "visiting" it. Neighbors could also send gifts and supplies to each other, complete specialized tasks together for rewards, and join "co-ops" - joint efforts to grow a certain amount of certain crops. Gifts were sent as mystery gifts with expensive, but random items, special deliveries with building supplies, or by choosing a particular item to send. They cost the sending user nothing. For FarmVille's 2nd birthday, a series of different mystery gifts were added to the Gifts Page.

== Development ==
The game was presented as a concept to Zynga by a small team from the University of Illinois, and was based on a previous Sims-style browser game. The team of four was hired and paired up with other Zynga staff, and an initial version of the game was released about 5 weeks later.

The game used Facebook's then-new API access, which allowed the game to exploit the interconnectedness of players.

In order to maintain engagement, the game demanded that players return frequently, e.g. to harvest a virtual crop before it withers and dies. This was beneficial to Facebook, since it drove some engagement with the platform.

=== Partnerships ===
FarmVille occasionally ran in-game partnerships where users can visit another company's virtual farm and buy or receive items with their brand logo. For example, as of June 9, 2011, users could get free McDonald's hot air balloons, McCafe products and the ability to visit McDonald's' virtual farm. Other brand partnerships include Minion, Frito Lay, Dish Network Hopper, Capital One, American Express, Lady Gaga, Rio (the motion picture), Haiti Relief Fund, Discover Card, Cascadian Farms, Megamind, Farmers Insurance, Microsoft Bing, and 7-Eleven. FarmVille also offered engagement advertising where users could interact with a brand in exchange for free Farm Cash through an ad platform called SVnetwork.

== Release ==
FarmVille has added numerous expansions over the game's lifetime, where players farm in new locales that include England, Hawaii, Japan, Atlantis, Winter holiday locations, Australia and more. As of 2014, FarmVille releases a new farm approximately every six weeks. It reached one million Daily Active Users four days after launch.

== Board games ==
In 2012, Zynga, in conjunction with Hasbro, released several kids' "Animal Games" based on FarmVille under the "Hasbro Gaming" imprint. These include versions of Memory (in a "Disco Dancing Sheep" pouch), Go Fish (in a "Groovy Chicken" pouch), Old Maid (in a "Rockstar Cow" pouch), and Hungry Hungry Herd (a redux of Hungry Hungry Hippos with the characters Gobbling Horse, Munching Pig, Snacking Sheep and Chomping Cow replacing the Hippos in the original game).

This is one of several games in the Zynga game library to be released as physical board game versions. Others include Draw Something, Words with Friends and a CityVille edition of Monopoly.

== Reception ==
Despite the initial success of the game, it has received a negative reaction from critics, video game designers, and personalities. Time magazine called the game one of the "50 Worst Inventions" in recent decades due to it being "the most addictive of Facebook games" and a "series of mindless chores on a digital farm".

In a December 2010 interview with Gamasutra, game designer and programmer Jonathan Blow criticized FarmVille for being designed to create an atmosphere of negativity, requiring an unprecedented commitment to the game, and encouraging users to exploit their friends.

The video game researcher Ian Bogost designed Cow Clicker as a satire of FarmVille and similar Zynga games to deconstruct the repetitiveness and perceived absurdity of such games.

=== Awards ===
FarmVille won an award at the Game Developers Conference for the "Best New Social/Online Game" in 2010. The crowd booed a Zynga executive as he accepted the award. During the 13th Annual Interactive Achievement Awards, the Academy of Interactive Arts & Sciences awarded FarmVille with "Social Networking Game of the Year", along with receiving nominations for "Outstanding Innovation in Gaming" and "Outstanding Achievement in Online Gameplay".

== Sequels ==
On June 26, 2012, FarmVille 2 was unveiled, and it was released in September 2012. It differs from the original FarmVille in a number of ways.

FarmVille 2: Country Escape for mobile devices (iOS, Android, Windows Phone and Windows operating systems) was released on April 10, 2014, and received a positive review from The New York Times. Unlike other games in the FarmVille series, FarmVille 2: Country Escape can be played offline.

FarmVille 3 was released on November 4, 2021 onto the Play Store and the App Store for iOS and Mac.
