= Justin Waldron =

American internet entrepreneur (born 1988)

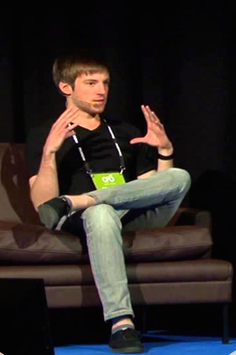
- Waldron speaking in Helsinki, Finland
- Born: Watertown, Connecticut, U.S.
- Education: University of Connecticut
- Occupations: Entrepreneur, investor
- Known for: Co-founder, Zynga; Co-founder, Zynga.org; Co-founder & president, Playco; Angel Investor

Justin Waldron is an American internet entrepreneur known as the co-founder of Zynga, a mobile social gaming company, and Zynga.org, a non-profit organization to promote and facilitate the use of social games for philanthropic initiatives. In 2020 Waldron co-founded Playco, a mobile instant game company backed by Sequoia Capital, where he currently serves as president.

Zynga is considered to be the pioneer of the social games industry. In 2011, Zynga held a $1 billion IPO and as of 2021 is the largest mobile gaming company by market share. Waldron is an angel investor in more than 50 technology companies and was named as one of the top 100 seed investors by Business Insider in 2021.

Zynga's most popular games include: FarmVille, CityVille, Zynga Poker, Mafia Wars, Words with Friends, and CSR Racing 2.

== Early life and background ==
Waldron was born and raised in Watertown, Connecticut. He began programming his first video games and websites at 11 years old, shortly after receiving his first computer. His early software projects included hacking AOL, a favorite childhood pastime shared by other notable technology company founders such as Mark Zuckerberg. Waldron also reverse engineered the disassembled MIPS machine code of PlayStation 2 games in his spare time to add his own features.

In high school, Waldron cracked Burger King's coupon code algorithm and launched a website to programmatically create unlimited free sandwich coupon codes for visitors. The website grew quickly in popularity resulting in a cease and desist notice from Burger King.

== Career ==
=== Zynga ===
In 2007, Justin dropped out of The University of Connecticut and co-founded Zynga at 19 years old. He created Zynga's first title, Zynga Poker in 2007. In 2008, Waldron led the game studio behind YoVille and later led product strategy across Zynga's studios. Waldron also worked on special projects with Zynga's other founders. He lived in Tokyo during Zynga's expansion to Japan. Waldron served as the SVP of Product at Zynga until 2013.

=== Playco ===
In 2020, it was announced that Waldron had co-founded Playco, which has received over $100 million in funding from Sequoia Capital and others. Playco is creating games that can be played instantly with friends without app downloads. The company's games are available within popular social applications such as Facebook, LINE, Snapchat, Viber, TikTok, Zoom and others.

=== Web3 / Blockchain ===
Waldron is active in the Web3 and broader blockchain ecosystem. In 2017, Waldron invested in the first blockchain focused hedge fund, Polychain Capital. In 2018, Waldron became an advisor to Dapper Labs, the creators of CryptoKitties and NBA Top Shot. Waldron also advises Immutable X, the first gas-free NFT platform on Ethereum. Waldron has advised Decentraland since 2018.

=== Investing ===
Waldron has made early-stage investments, advised, or served on the board of directors for companies such as Substack, Lambda School, Kik Messenger, Asia Innovations Group, Snappr, and over 50 others.

== Philanthropy and community service ==
=== Zynga.org ===
In October 2009, Waldron and his co-founders started Zynga.org, which is "committed to transforming the world through virtual social goods." Zynga.org has since raised more than $20 million for more than 50 international nonprofits by occasionally selling virtual goods for charitable causes.

On March 11, 2011, Zynga announced that 100 percent of the proceeds from the purchase of virtual goods from more than seven of its games would go toward Japan's Save the Children Earthquake Emergency Fund. During the 2012 holiday season, Zynga.org partnered with Toys for Tots in its largest charitable campaign not related to disaster relief. The campaign raised $745,000, with 100 percent of the purchase price of certain virtual goods going to Toys for Tots.

=== Thiel Foundation ===
Waldron is a mentor at Peter Thiel's Thiel Foundation, using his experience as a college dropout to help young entrepreneurs in the Thiel Fellowship's 20 Under 20 program.

=== Government ===
Waldron is a special advisor to the Shibuya city government in Tokyo, Japan. His focus is helping to grow the startup ecosystem in Japan.
