= Daniel J. Porter =

American Internet entrepreneur (born 1966)

Daniel Jonathan Porter (born June 13, 1966) is an American Internet entrepreneur. He is the founder and former CEO of Overtime, a digital sports media company that is geared towards Generation Z sports fans. He was previously the Head of Digital at William Morris Endeavor, the former CEO of OMGPOP and the creator of the Draw Something mobile game. Following the sale of OMGPOP to Zynga, he was the GM of Zynga New York for one year. He also served as the first president of Teach For America.

== Background ==
Born in Cambridge, Massachusetts, Porter was raised in Ardmore, Pennsylvania, a suburb of Philadelphia. His parents were college professors at the University of Pennsylvania and Bryn Mawr College.

His great uncle is the Nobel Prize–winning economist Milton Friedman.

Porter is married to filmmaker Melanie Judd, and they have two sons.

== Education ==
Porter graduated from Friends Central School, in Wynnewood, Pennsylvania.

Porter is a 1988 graduate of Princeton University with an A.B. in History. While at Princeton, Dan focused on music, spending four years with the Princeton jazz band as a keyboardist and weekends earning money playing piano at Faculty Club brunches.

He is a 1995 graduate of NYU with an M.A. in Latin American Studies.

== Educational career ==
Porter began by teaching at Clara Barton High School in the Crown Heights neighborhood of Brooklyn, New York.

In 1990 he joined the early team of Teach America at its first summer training institute. In 1994 he became the first president of Teach For America, where he worked on the expansion of the program to Phoenix and Seattle and the Americorps program.

After leaving Teach For America, Porter ran Cities in Schools, a youth organization in New York City, which also was a partner with Goldman, Sachs in running the Metropolitan Corporate Academy.

== Business career ==
In 1999 Porter served as the president of TicketWeb. He led its sale to TicketMaster (IAC) in 2000.

Porter also worked for Richard Branson's Virgin Group, where he started the Virgin Festival in North America, ran Corporate development for Virgin USA and invested in several companies.

In 2009 Porter became the CEO of Iminlikewithyou which subsequently changed its name to OMGPOP. In February 2012 the company released the mobile game Draw Something. In 50 days it had 50 million downloads, making it, at the time, the fastest-growing mobile game ever. On March 22, 2012 Zynga acquired OMGPOP for $180 million. Draw Something eventually recorded over 250 million downloads.

In 2012 he was named by Business Insider as the 6th most influential person in New York tech.

In April 2013 Porter left Zynga.

From 2013 to 2016 Porter ran digital at WME - IMG where he conceived of and launched the Esports practice, culminating in the E League; led the digital talent division; launched the fashion network Made to Measure; and launched and led WME Ventures.

== Overtime ==
In November 2016 Porter left WME - IMG to launch Overtime.

Overtime raised a $2.5 million seed round led by Greycroft and former NBA Commissioner David Stern in January 2017.

Overtime raised a $9.5 million A round, led by Andreessen Horowitz and included Kevin Durant, announced in February 2018.

In 2018, its first year of operations, Overtime generated over one billion video views. By 2019, Overtime was doing a billion video views every month and had expanded to basketball, football, soccer and video games.

Overtime raised a $23 million B round led by Spark Capital and included Carmelo Anthony in February 2019.

Overtime raised an $80 million C round led by Sapphire Sport and Black Capital and included Jeff Bezos and Drake in April 2021.

In March 2021, Overtime announced the launch of Overtime Elite, a professional basketball league for 16-to-19 year-olds.

In March 2022, Overtime announced the launch of OT7, a seven-on-seven football league.

Overtime raised a $100 million D round led by Liberty Media Corporation in August 2022.

In March 2026, Porter departed Overtime.

== Controversy ==
Porter stirred controversy when, over Twitter, he slammed a former employee who decided to leave OMGPOP concurrent with the acquisition by Zynga.

Porter was involved in a back and forth over Twitter with Notch of Minecraft fame.
