= Zynga Bingo =

2012 video game

- Developer: Zynga
- Composer: Brian L. Schmidt
- Platform: Facebook
- Genre: Social network game
- Mode: Multiplayer

Zynga Bingo is a social network game developed by Zynga and released on Facebook in February 2012. The game is part of a larger franchise called Zynga Casino, which was announced in October 2011 at the company's Unleashed event, and also includes Zynga Poker.

== Gameplay ==
During the game, numbers are called out randomly as players try to score five numbers in a row, or all four corners on their card to win a “bingo”. Players are able to chat with other players as they compete against each other.

Players earn coins, cards, and keys to move up levels and unlock themed rooms within the game and may have up to six Bingo cards at any given time.

The games take place in themed rooms, including Vegas Lights, where the bingo balls shoot out of a classic Cadillac; Pirate's Paradise, which features a pirate map, golden coins, and a treasure chest; and FarmVille Bounty, where users are able to play inside scenes from Zynga's popular game FarmVille. As a bonus, players earn coins and tickets that can be used to unlock hidden rooms.

Each player is able to see how many current players there are for a particular room, the top available prize, and how many tickets it will cost to play. Players can also challenge friends to a race to see who can get Bingo first.

=== Power-Ups ===
Players can buy Power-Ups to accelerate the game. Each Power-Up is different. Some Power-Ups supply the player with mystery crates and keys while others contain a free daub. Some have the ability to charge up power-ups that can be used at any time thereafter. These power-ups may add piles of coins to the board, or automatically daub different numbers, if the player is struggling to achieve Bingo.

Friend Boost Power-Up allows a player to ask friends to help. Friends can offer help even when they're not signed in, and their Facebook profile picture will substitute as a Bingo chip on the board.
