= Word Streak with Friends =

2012 video game

- Developer: Zynga
- Platforms: iPhone, iPod Touch, iPad, Android
- Genre: Word game
- Mode: Multiplayer

Word Streak (formerly Scramble with Friends) is a word game developed by Zynga with Friends for iOS and Android and released in January 2012. Gameplay is similar to that of Boggle—players try to find as many words as possible in a jumbled 4x4 grid of letters by connecting adjacent letters to form words within a two-minute time frame - though with extra features and a different scoring system. Words may be formed vertically, horizontally, and diagonally. Scramble with Friends is one of the top ranking games in the iOS application store, available as both a free ad-supported version and an ad-less paid version. Scramble with Friends replaced Scramble Challenge at the end of 2011, but did not retain the solitaire option of the latter.

In June 2015, the game was rebranded as Word Streak with Friends as part of a major update.

== Gameplay ==
Players can play the game in one of four modes: head-to-head (against a friend), daily challenge, tournaments (against several other real-time competitors), and solo play.

Each game consists of three rounds played in series and the winner is the player with the highest total score of all three rounds. The second round introduces tiles with double letter and word multipliers, the third round triple multipliers. The scoring system favors both longer words and words containing less common letters.

There are four power-ups which players may employ: 'Freeze' grants the player a few seconds of extra time, 'Inspiration' highlights words for the player to play, 'Scramble' rotates/flips the board granting the player a new perspective, and 'Vision' gives the player 3 words to find and if all words are found, gives the player a time bonus.

A token system operates, players must pay one token per round and a second token if they wish to use two powerups in a round rather than one. A new token is earned every 20 minutes (regardless of whether the app is open). Extra tokens are available for purchase, and the paid ad-free version boasts a faster token earning rate (1 token every 10 minutes).

Players may sign in through Facebook and invite friends to play, search for opponents by username or be matched with random users. In addition, there is a chat feature built in the game that allows chat between opponents.

== Boggle with Friends ==
In 2017, Zynga officially licensed Boggle, and released Boggle with Friends. Boggle with Friends offers the same game play with new features and enhancements, and shares its games database as Word Streak with Friends and likewise, with Scramble with Friends (a player can start a game in one app and finish it in the other). The major differences between the two are the names, graphics, color schemes, and that Boggle with Friends continues to receive new updates.

== See also ==
- Words with Friends
