= Six Degrees patent =

The Six Degrees patent, United States patent #6,175,831, "Method and apparatus for constructing a networking database and system", granted to Andrew Weinreich, et al., has been considered the definitive patent covering social networking by the owners of Tribe.net and LinkedIn. The patent claims covered the building of an online social network by having participants identify contacts who are related to them (i.e. their online friends), and then obtaining from each of these contacts a confirmation accepting the connection or not. The patent was sold along with SixDegrees to YouthStream Media Networks in 2000 and later to Reid Hoffman of LinkedIn and Mark Pincus of Zynga and Tribe.net for $700,000 at an auction in 2003. When explaining his reasoning for purchasing the Six Degrees patent, Hoffman stated, "Right now you're hearing a lot of spurious patent threats (...) And that's why I moved quickly to get a patent that was foundational." He also commented on other entrepreneurs' views of social networking: "The general attitude among entrepreneurial people is that they think that they were first and that there is no history to what they are doing (...) Both Mark and I had tracked six degrees as an intellectual precursor to our own businesses." Andrew Katz of Fox Rothschild, specialist in Internet intellectual property, said of Hoffman's and Pincus' acquisition of the patent: "It should be taken very seriously by everybody in the industry because it is in the hands of people who have the means and the business acumen to enforce it properly."
