= Andrew Bachman =

American entrepreneur (born 1983)

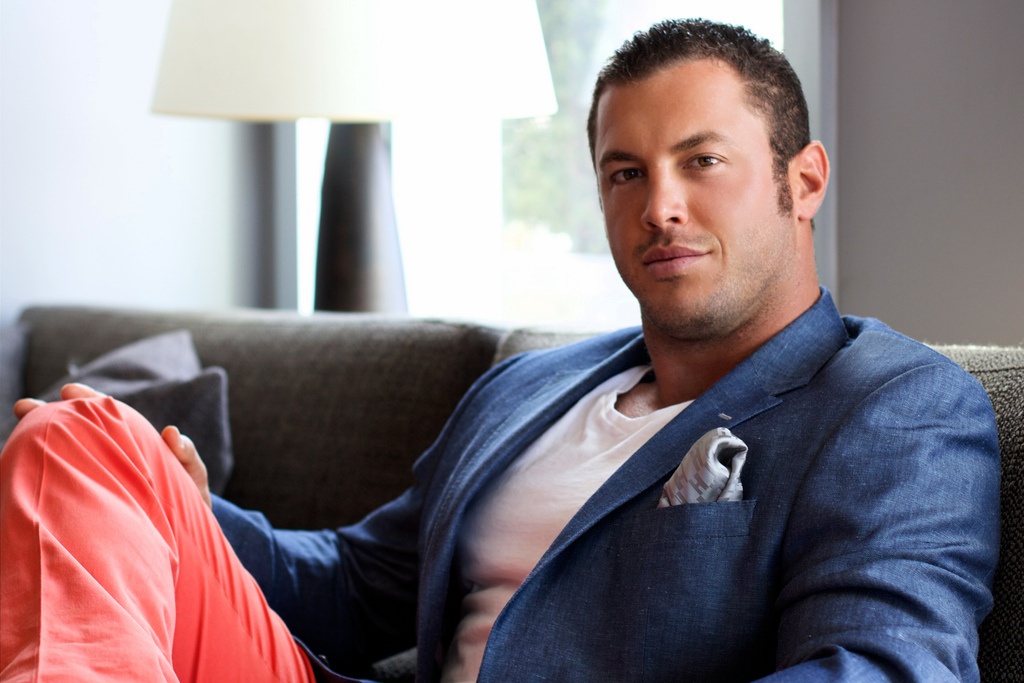
- Born: June 9, 1983 (age 43); Wayland, MA
- Education: Babson College (BA, 2006)
- Occupations: Co-founder, Tatto Media (president, 2005-09); Co-founder, Scambook (president, 2011-12); Founder, Game Plan (president, CEO, CFO & chairman, 2012-14); Co-founder, Creators Inc. (manager, 2022-present)
- Years active: 2005-present
- Website: Creators Inc.

Andrew Bachman (born June 9, 1983) is an American entrepreneur, investor, and talent agent. He was the founder of several companies, including Game Plan Holdings; after being charged with mobile cramming by the Federal Trade Commission, he resigned as president, chief executive officer, chief financial officer and chairman of Game Plan Holdings on February 11, 2014. He later agreed to a settlement with the FTC that included a monetary judgment of more than $97 million. The judgment was partially suspended based on Bachman's inability to pay the full amount, after he turned over nearly all of his assets. Following his legal issues, Bachman co-founded the Creators Inc. talent agency in 2022, which made $60 million in its first year of operation.

== Early life and education ==
Bachman was born and raised in Wayland, Massachusetts, to physician parents. He attended Babson College in Wellesley, Massachusetts, graduating in 2006. From 2010 through 2013, Bachman co-funded a scholarship at his alma mater however his sponsorship of the scholarship was rescinded by the college following the FTC proceedings and seizure of his assets

== Career ==
=== Tatto Media ===
In 2005, while at Babson, Bachman partnered with fellow Babson students Lin Miao, Lucas Brown and Lee Brown to create Tatto Media, an Internet advertising and marketing company. The company offered advertisers a different way to pay for online banner advertising, with payment based on performance rather than impressions. Bachman served as president of Tatto, which was based in Boston and also had offices in Seattle and Los Angeles.

In 2008, Tatto was named a Top Global 250 company by AlwaysOn. That year, the company reached annual revenue figures of $40 million. The following year, revenues topped $100 million, and by 2010, according to comScore, the company had become the third-largest ad network in the world, and had 120 employees.

Tatto was sued by the attorney general of Washington state in 2008 and again in 2009 for running MyLuvCrush ads that promised to reveal the identity of a user's secret admirer. Instead, users were sent a text with the name of a fake person and then charged a subscription fee for monthly horoscopes. In November 2009, Facebook banned Tatto from providing offers in games and apps. This was due to "repeated policy violations" of the social network's guidelines for offers, specifically for deceptive in-game ads and other scamming issues enabling the company to collect hidden obligations and fees. Former Zynga CEO Mark Pincus referred to Tatto as the "worst offender" on Facebook.

In 2011, mobile social network game developer Ozura World acquired Tatto Media for $60 million. By 2013, according to Liao, Tatto was defunct and no longer had any ties to Ozura World.

=== Scambook ===
On March 1, 2011, following the sale of Tatto, Bachman, Miao and Jay Edelson, managing partner of law firm Edelson PC, founded Scambook.com, a consumer-complaint platform that linked consumers with attorneys to address various types of scams perpetrated by companies. Bachman served as the company's president. In 2011, after being named to the Empact 100 list of top US entrepreneurs under the age of 30, Bachman was invited to the White House and honored for his accomplishments at Scambook. He sold his shares of Scambook in July 2012.

In 2013, Scambook was investigated by the Illinois attorney general's office for fraudulent trading. The FBI received thousands of complaints from both companies and consumers about Scambook's unethical activities and lack of transparency. Investigations alleged that Scambook would post fraudulent complaints about companies and individuals. Companies were then expected to subscribe to Scambook's business resolve service, where they effectively had to pay a monthly fee in order to remove the complaints made against them. The Chicago Better Business Bureau gave Scambook an F rating and issued a red alert against the company due to a pattern of unresolved complaints, and the fact that, in Chicago, there was no office at the address listed for the company.

=== Game Plan Holdings ===
In April 2012, Bachman became president and chief financial officer of Game Plan Holdings, a supplement company he co-founded with two of his former Babson College students. He became chairman and chief executive officer in March 2013. Game Plan Holdings was a publicly traded company under the ticker GPLH. Game Plan formerly operated the sports-related social networking sites Hazzsports.com, Totalscout.com and CheckinSave.com, all of which were folded in February 2013. At that time, Game Plan Holdings acquired Sporting Blood, a vitamin and nutritional supplements company, and launched Game Plan Nutrition, which made protein shakes and other supplements. It had an online network of trainers who earned commissions by recommending the company's products. The nutritional products were used by NFL, NBA and MLB athletes.

In November 2013, Bachman was featured in the Boston Globe as an example of "fit entrepreneurs" breaking longstanding stereotypes of the tech world. On February 11, 2014, he resigned as president, chief executive officer, chief financial officer and chairman of Game Plan.

=== Creators Inc. ===
Bachman co-founded the Creators Inc. talent agency in 2022, which is focused on supporting social media influencers.

Originally catering to OnlyFans models in the Los Angeles area, the company made $60 million in revenue during its first year of operation. The company owns an Encino, California mansion specifically designed for content creation.

Among the firm’s clients are RAF wrestler Georgio Poullas, who Bachman personally negotiated a contract for in 2026 that earned him the largest single-match salary in competitive wrestling history.

== Legal issues ==
In December 2013, charges were filed by the Federal Trade Commission in US District Court against Bachman, Miao and corporate defendants including Tatto, accusing them of a mobile cramming scheme. Miao's attorneys denied that Tatto engaged in deceptive or unfair practices, and argued the suit had no merit because Tatto was no longer in business. On June 15, 2014, the FTC announced that Miao and the corporate defendants agreed to surrender more than $10 million in assets to settle the monetary judgment of over $150 million. Although he was named in the original FTC complaint, Bachman was not named in the settlement. He was, however, said to be involved with some of the corporate defendants in the settlement at the time of the alleged scheme. Bachman stated that he was years removed from any involvement with Tatto.

In Augusts 2014, judgment was entered against Bachman in the amount of approximately $97 million. The judgment was partially suspended based on Bachman's inability to pay the full amount. He agreed to surrender over $1.2 million in assets to settle the FTC charges. He also was permanently banned from placing any charges on consumers' phone bills, misrepresenting products or a consumer's obligation to pay, and was prohibited from charging consumers for a product or service without their consent, which were similar to the conditions Miao and the corporate defendants faced in their settlement.

Among the assets Bachman was required to surrender under the terms of the settlement were:

- the contents of four bank accounts, less $4,500;
- two vehicles: a 2012 Ferrari 458 Italia and a 2012 Mercedes G550 SUV;
- shares in a number of startup companies; and
- jewelry items, including three Audemars watches, one Patek Phillippe watch, and four Rolex watches.
