= Montopia =

- Developer(s): Zynga Japan
- Publisher(s): Zynga
- Platform(s): iOS; Android
- Release: iOS, Android; September 12, 2012
- Genre(s): role-playing game
- Mode(s): Single-player with multiplayer interaction

Montopia was a role-playing game (RPG) developed by Zynga Japan and published by Zynga for iOS and Android devices. Originally launched in Japan in early 2012, it was Zynga’s first original mobile game developed for the Japanese market. The game was released globally in English on September 12, 2012, and followed with Traditional Chinese and Korean versions in October 2012.

== History ==
Montopia was originally launched in early 2012 only in Japan, for Apple iOS and Google Android devices. Montopia was released globally in English for iOS and Android in September 2012 and followed with Traditional Chinese and Korean versions in October 2012. The game was closed on December 21, 2012.

== Gameplay ==
Montopia is a mobile social role-playing game that challenged players to travel with their childhood friend, Milly, across the land of Montopia. Montopia is an island Utopia where mankind and monsters once lived before it was destroyed by a mysterious disaster. The goal of Montopia was for players to collect and train monsters and use them in battles to discover the island’s secrets.

== Currency ==
Montopia was free to download on iOS and Android devices. Through in-app purchases, players could buy energy that help them grow stronger and enhance their gameplay.

== Features ==
Monster collection and fusion: Players could discover, collect, and fuse hundreds of different monsters to enhance their abilities.

Social and PvP elements: The game included features for cooperative play and battling other players, leveraging Zynga’s social gaming expertise.

In-app purchases: Montopia was free to play, with optional in-app purchases for energy and other gameplay enhancements.

== Reception ==
Montopia was part of a wave of card-battling and monster-collecting games that became popular in Japan and were introduced to Western audiences by companies like Zynga, GREE, and DeNA. The game was noted for its engaging monster fusion mechanics and social features, but it struggled to stand out in a crowded market.

== Shutdown ==
Despite its initial launch and global rollout, Montopia was short-lived. Zynga shut down the game on December 21, 2012, only a few months after its international release. The closure reflected Zynga’s broader retreat from several underperforming mobile and social games during that period.

== Legacy ==
Montopia is remembered as one of Zynga’s early attempts to break into the Japanese and global mobile RPG market, and as an example of the company’s experimentation with the monster-collection genre.
