= Tatto Media =

American affiliate marketing advertising network

- Website type: Advertising Network
- Creators: Lin Miao, Andrew Bachman
- Employees: 22
- Website: http://www.tattomedia.com/
- Registration: Client
- Launched: February 3, 2006
- Current status: version 1.0

Tatto Media is an affiliate marketing advertising network based in Boston.

Tatto Media sold to Ozura World Ltd. for US$60 million on April 11, 2011.

== Products ==
Tatto Media has what it calls an Advertising Platform, a Display Platform, a Performance Platform and a Virtual Currency Platform.

The Self Serve Advertising Platform enables advertisers to create campaigns and place tracking codes signifying new customers. From there, Tatto Media analyzes the campaign and optimization algorithms to distribute across the right distribution channels.

The Display Platform is for display publishers looking to place advertisements. The platform can show advertisement formatted for social applications, site banners or the full page.

The Performance Platform links affiliates with exclusive advertisements.

The Virtual Currency Platform includes payment processing, advertiser network, and statistics for tracking and customization of advertisements.

== Awards ==
It was named by Business Week as one of the top 25th entrepreneurial businesses of 2007.

In late 2008 the company received the title of Babson Student Business of the Year Award.

Tatto Media is a member of the IAB and American Marketing Association (AMA).

== Controversy and legal issues ==
=== Washington State vs. Tatto Media ===
In late 2008, the company was the subject of investigation into false and deceptive advertising with the Washington State Attorney General's Office. On November 17, the company and Washington State Attorney General settled in Assurance of Discontinuance for $20,262.

In early 2009, the company had further discussions with the Attorney General's Office over a disagreement regarding the Assurance of Discontinuance of November 17, 2009 and eventually settled for half a million dollars.

Tatto Media used to partner with Zynga but this business relationship was terminated in 2009. The CEO of Zynga, Mark Pincus, had following to say about Tatto Media:

We have worked hard to police and remove bad offers. In fact, the worst offender, tatto media [sic], referenced in the techcrunch article, had already been taken down and permanently banned prior to the post.

Tatto Media has repeatedly featured as a scam advertiser. Quote from Techcrunch:

A typical scam: users are offered in game currency in exchange for filling out an IQ survey. Four simple questions are asked. The answers are irrelevant. When the user gets to the last question they are told their results will be text messaged to them. They are asked to enter in their mobile phone number, and are texted a pin code to enter on the quiz. Once they’ve done that, they’ve just subscribed to a $9.99/month subscription. Tatto Media is the company at the very end of the line on most mobile scams, and they flow it up through Offerpal, SuperRewards and others to the game developers.

The company was criticized on a similar scam using free poster offers - including The Twilight Saga stars that tied an undisclosed monthly credit card subscription fee to the poster request.

The company has been noted for running deceptive offers involving text charges and mobile subscriptions which often trick consumers into signing up for services.
