= Dream PetHouse =

2012 video game

- Developer: Zynga
- Publisher: Zynga
- Platforms: iOS, Android
- Release: February 2, 2012
- Genre: Simulation video game

Dream PetHouse is a defunct mobile simulation social network game created by Zynga. This game was available for users to download starting on February 2, 2012. The game was similar to other games that focus on building, such as Zynga Dream Zoo. In Dream PetHouse, users could collect and care for cute animals. A free version of the game was available to users, but to speed up advancement in the game, a user could pay real money to buy digital fruit, seeds or coins. This type of game is known as a freemium. The height of Dream PetHouse's popularity was in June, 2012, when according to Daily Active User (DAU) metrics, there were about 400,515 daily users. Using DAU metrics, Dream PetHouse had about 12,602 daily users in April, 2013. On May 21, 2013, Zynga announced that it would cease supporting this game on June 28, 2013. The server was finally shut down on July 4 or 5.
