= CityVille Hometown =

2011 social network video game

- Developer: Zynga
- Platforms: iOS (iPad, iPhone, iPod Touch) Android
- Release: June 2011
- Genre: Social city-building simulation game

CityVille Hometown is a defunct social city-building simulation game. Based on CityVille and developed by Zynga, the mobile game was released in June 2011 and is available on iOS (iPad, iPhone, iPod Touch).

CityVille Hometown is a standalone iOS title, but players can import existing Facebook and CityVille friends. CityVille Hometown players can exchange gifts and with one another as well as visit towns.

It was Zynga's first mobile game to be released in five languages. It was available in English, French, Italian, German and Spanish.
