= Zynga.org =

Former nonprofit organization

Zynga.org was an independent nonprofit organization started by social games developer Zynga, Inc., in October 2009. The purpose of Zynga.org was to promote and facilitate the use of social games for philanthropic initiatives. It was incorporated as a separate legal entity in March 2012. The organization was dissolved in 2016.

== History ==
Zynga.org worked with Zynga, Inc., and more than 50 nonprofit partners, corporate partners, and other game makers. As of early 2013, Zynga.org had generated more than $15 million for charitable organizations globally and launched more than 95 in-game social impact campaigns for a variety of international relief agencies, to which 3 million players had contributed.

Early Zynga.org campaigns enabled players to contribute to charitable causes by purchasing specially created virtual goods within Zynga games. For example, in October 2009, virtual sugar beets were available for players to purchase in FarmVille. Proceeds benefited two Haiti-based charities: FATEM.org and FONKOZE.org. Within the month, the sugar beet promotion had raised $427,000.

In January 2010, Zynga.org raised $1.5 million in five days for Haiti earthquake Relief. The promotion ran across FarmVille, FishVille, Mafia Wars, and Zynga Poker.

In September 2010, Zynga.org raised $500,000 in two days for L’Ecole de Choix, a K-12 school Zynga is building in Mirebalais, Haiti. Zynga.org raised more than $800,000 in December 2010 for the UCSF Benioff Children’s Hospital as part of the UCSF Challenge for the Children competition. In March 2011, Zynga announced 100 percent of proceeds from purchases of virtual goods in more than seven of its games would go to Japan's Save the Children Earthquake Emergency Fund. In the same month, Lady Gaga contributed to Save the Children and the American Red Cross from the sales of her Japan Prayer bracelets to Zynga.org. During the 2012 holiday season, Zynga.org partnered with Toys for Tots in its largest charitable campaign not related to disaster relief. The campaign raised $745,000, with 100 percent of the purchase price of certain virtual goods going to Toys for Tots.

In 2012, Zynga game player contributions enabled Water.org to provide access to clean water to about 20,655 people. A two-week FarmVille campaign in partnership with AARP’s Drive to End Hunger provided more than 700,000 meals to senior citizens in need. In a Words With Friends celebrity challenge, celebrities competed to win a portion of $500,000 to donate to their chosen charity.

In 2013, Zynga.org announced its partnership with Games for Change and Half the Sky Movement, led by journalists Nicholas Kristof and Sheryl WuDunn, to help create a Facebook game based on the book, Half the Sky: Turning Oppression into Opportunity for Women Worldwide. The game is seen as the first attempt to create a popular game based on a single complex social issue. All proceeds from the game go to nonprofit organizations.

In September 2016, the Zynga.org website was replaced with a redirect to Zynga's website. A tax return filed that year listed the organization as having been dissolved.
