= OMGPop =

Game studio acquired by Zynga Inc. in 2013

- Final logo

- Homepage The homepage as of January 2013
- Website type: Social networking service, online games, chat rooms
- Available in: English
- Owner: Zynga Inc.
- Founder: Charles Forman
- CEO: Dan Porter
- Commercial: Yes
- Registration: Free
- Launched: Late 2006
- Current status: inactive as of 30 September 2013

OMGPop, stylized as OMGPOP and formerly known as i'minlikewithyou or iilwy, was an independent flash game studio. In 2013, it was purchased by Zynga Inc.

== History ==
OMGPop was based in SoHo, in New York City. The company received seed funding from Y Combinator during its early days as a startup.

The website was listed on Time magazine's 50 Best Websites of 2009.

On 21 March 2012, Zynga announced that it would acquire OMGPop for $180 million, saying "It is our mission to provide consumers with fun, free games. We believe OMGPop will help us fulfill our promise."

Mark Pincus, CEO of Zynga, announced in an official blog post on 3 June 2013 that the company would be laying off 18% of its employees in order to restructure the company and cut back on finances. Many former OMGPop employees were laid off, and the New York office was one of the three that Zynga shut down. While this had been reported as the closure of OMGPop, the omgpop.com website remained active. However, in a statement issued by parent company Zynga in July 2013, it was announced that the site would close on 30 September 2013, with four games – Cupcake Corner, Gem Rush, Pool World Champ and Snoops – being phased out on 29 August 2013.

Around 2013, Zynga suffered a large data breach exposing over 7 million email addresses and plain text passwords for OMGPop which were later leaked in 2019. The breach was first reported to The Hacker News in September 2019 by Pakistani hacker "Gnosticplayers" claiming to have access to 218 million accounts across the Zynga portfolio. Although the breach was later confirmed by Zynga, the company did not comment on the number of accounts and may have failed to disclose the breach to users.

== Games ==
OMGPop's game selection included standard board, card, and sports video games, clones of more well known video games, and special versions of licensed games such as Atari's Missile Command.

OMGPop's most popular game was their Pictionary-like game entitled Draw Something. On 16 March 2012 it was reported that it was the most played game on Facebook registering 10.8 million daily active users, compared to Zynga's Words with Friends with 8.6 million daily active users.

On 4 April 2012 OMGPop reported that their hit game Draw Something had surpassed over 50 million downloads and that since the game's launch, over 6 billion drawings had been shared between friends.

=== List of games ===
- 9 Ball Pool
- Aim Really Good
- Aim for the Nuts
- Balloono
- Balloono Classic
- Ballracer
- Blockles
- Booya!
- Checkers
- Coin Party
- Cupcake Corner
- Defuse
- Dinglepop
- Draw My Thing
- Draw Something
- Fireworks
- Fleet Fighter
- Fourplay
- Gemmers
- Hamster Battle
- HamsterJet
- Hangman
- Hit Machine
- Hover Kart Battle
- Hover Kart Racing
- Hover Kart Party
- Jigsawce
- Letterblox
- Lottery
- Omgfife
- Poll Positions Lite
- Pool
- Puppy World
- Putt My Penguin
- Quiz World
- Rock Paper Scissors
- Sky Pigs
- Solitaire
- Spin The Bottle
- Swapples
- Tonk
- Tracism
- Trivia
- Typow!
- Typow Remix
- Pets
- Unscramble
