= Snappr =

Technology company

- Type: Private
- Industry: Photography
- Founded: 2016
- Founders: Matt Schiller (CEO); Ed Kearney (COO)
- Headquarters: San Francisco, U.S.
- Areas served: United States, Australia
- Services: On-demand professional photography, Photo analysis tools

Snappr is a technology company headquartered in San Francisco whose primary business offering is an on-demand professional photography booking service. The company also offers a free photo analysis tool for use with social media profiles. Snappr's key investors include seed accelerator Y Combinator.

== History ==
Snappr was founded in May 2016 by Matt Schiller and Ed Kearney in Sydney, Australia. The two met while attending the University of New South Wales and, while still at the university, founded prior venture, online graduation retailer, GownTown. The company initially serviced Australian cities of Sydney, Melbourne, and Brisbane. By August 2016, the company had raised $500,000 AUD in pre-seed funding with notable backing from Australian test cricket captain, Steve Smith.

In early 2017, the company received backing from the U.S. startup accelerator, Y Combinator, and opened a San Francisco office. By February 2017, the service was available in most Australian capital cities along with the U.S. cities of San Francisco and San Jose. The same year, it raised a $2 million seed funding from investors that included Airtree Ventures, Google Maps co-founder Lars Rasmussen, and co-founder of Zynga Justin Waldron. Also in 2017, the company introduced its Photo Analyzer feature for use with websites such as LinkedIn. Mattermark also ranked it the fastest growing startup in Y Combinator Winter 2017.

== Technology ==
The company's primary business offering is an on-demand professional photography booking marketplace. The service links pre-vetted professional photographers to consumers wanting a photoshoot. Photographers are required to undergo a photography portfolio review, an equipment review, a review of any past professional photography work, and a customer service interview. Around 5% of applicants are selected to be on the Snappr service.

Snappr's pricing is fixed based on the number of hours the photographer works and the number of photos the client wants to keep. Clients are matched with photographers based on proximity, availability, and specialization.

Snappr also produces the free Snappr Photo Analyzer tool. It uses artificial intelligence to gauge the efficacy of professional headshots on websites like LinkedIn. Snappr has also published anonymized reports detailing industry-based and other trends in professional photographs of tens of thousands of users.
