= Daniel Porter =

Daniel Porter could refer to:

- Daniel Porter (pirate), 18th-century Caribbean pirate and trader
- Daniel Porter (Canadian football) (born 1987), American player of Canadian football
- Dan Porter (1931–2017), American baseball player
- Daniel J. Porter (born 1966), American businessman
- D. P. Porter (Daniel Price Porter, 1835–1899), Mississippi lawyer and politician
- Daniel Porter (born 1992), known professionally as Daniel Portman, Scottish actor

== See also ==
- Daniel Porter Jordan III (born 1964), American jurist
