= Zynga with Friends =

Video game developer

- Company logo
- Type: Subsidiary
- Industry: Video games
- Founded: 2008
- Fate: Dissolved by Zynga
- Headquarters: McKinney, Texas
- Key people: Paul Bettner; David Bettner; Michael Chow
- Products: Chess with Friends (2008); Words with Friends (2009); We Rule (2010); Hanging with Friends (2011); Scramble with Friends (2012); Matching with Friends (2012); Gems with Friends (2012); Stampede Run (2013)
- Parent: Zynga (2010–present)

Zynga with Friends (formerly Newtoy, Inc.) was a video game developer founded in 2008 by brothers Paul Bettner and David Bettner, and their cousin Michael Chow. In November 2008, Newtoy, Inc. released its first game for the iPhone and iPod touch, Chess with Friends, an asynchronous multiplayer game released for the Apple App Store. In August 2009, it released its second game for iPhone and iPod touch, Words with Friends, another asynchronous multiplayer game with gameplay similar to Scrabble, which ultimately became their best known game. In November 2010, the company was acquired by Zynga for $53.3 million and an undisclosed amount of stock. After the acquisition, the studio was rebranded to Zynga with Friends in December 2010. Newtoy was the company's 14th acquisition during its peak years. "We're reinventing the way people are social on their mobile devices," said Paul Bettner. "The Zynga With Friends Studio will build on the Newtoy legacy of creating approachable, highly social games that are accessible to anyone from anywhere." Bettner said, "We believe [the iPhone] has the potential to be as revolutionary to handheld gaming as the original Gameboy was."

Zynga with Friends' third title, Hanging with Friends, came out on June 9, 2011. Scramble with Friends followed in January 2012. The company was attempting to capitalize on the breakthrough success of Words with Friends, Zynga re-launched Zynga with Friends as a standalone social network in June 2012. During the fall of 2012, it was clear that Zynga with Friends' social network was no longer successful; the Bettner brothers left the company, with Zynga's stock price starting a decline.

== Games ==
Release Date	Title	Genre	Latest Update Date	Version	Platform
November 2008	Chess with Friends	Strategy	April 4, 2014	4.19	iOS (6.0 and later)
August 2009	Words with Friends	Strategy; Puzzle	January 25, 2014 (iPad); April 9, 2014 (iPhone)	6.60 (iPad); 7.22 (iPhone)	iOS
February 2011	Words with Friends	Strategy; Puzzle	July 12, 2012	4.92	Android
March 2010	We Rule	Simulation RPG	September 14, 2012	1.51	iOS
June 2011	Hanging with Friends	Strategy	April 3, 2014	4.45	iOS
September 2011	Hanging with Friends	Strategy	May 9, 2012	4.54	Android
January 2012	Scramble with Friends	Strategy; Puzzle; Word game	May 14, 2014 (iPhone); January 22, 2014 (iPad)	4.4.2 (iPhone); 1.06 (iPad)	iOS
January 2012	Scramble with Friends	Strategy; Puzzle; Word game	August 14, 2012	4.73	Android
June 2012	Matching with Friends	Strategy; Puzzle	21 April 2014	4.24	iOS
September 2013	Matching with Friends	Strategy; Puzzle	September 10, 2013	4.92	Android
August 2012	Gems with Friends	Strategy; Puzzle	January 14, 2014	4.19	iOS
January 2013	Stampede Run (formerly Running with Friends)	Endless runner	May 6, 2014	2.42	iOS
November 2013	Stampede Run (formerly Running with Friends)	Endless runner	November 22, 2013	1.54	Android
