= YoWorld =

2008 video game

- Developers: Big Viking Games (2014–present); Zynga Inc. (2008–2014); Tall Tree Games (2008)
- Platforms: PHP and Smartfox Server
- Release: May 8, 2008
- Genre: Virtual world
- Mode: Single-player with multiplayer interaction

YoWorld (formerly YoVille) is a browser-based virtual world game which was released on May 8, 2008. It is developed by Big Viking Games. The game operates on the freemium model, and is supported through microtransactions, as well as a voluntary in-game ad program. The game itself is free-to-play, however, players can purchase in-game currencies or enroll in special programs and offers to improve their game-play experience or help them progress faster, using real money.

Users can create a virtual avatar, and enter the virtual world. Within YoWorld, players can earn virtual coins and currencies (like YoCoins and YoCash) in-game by completing various jobs and tasks in-game. They can also purchase more with real money. Users can then use these funds to purchase and decorate new homes, purchase more clothing and gear for their avatars, adopt pets, or even take advantage of the game's virtual economy, and make investments by buying, selling, and trading items with other players. Other activities in-game include mini-games, hosting parties, socializing and chatting with other users, and role-play. The game is currently available on the social media platform, Facebook, as a browser-based game. It can also be accessed through Facebook's Game Room platform.

The game was originally released and developed by Tall Tree Games in 2008. That same year, the game was purchased by gaming giant Zynga, inspiring other later titles like FarmVille and CityVille. Tall Tree Games was the original name for the game's current company, Big Viking Games, who sought to acquire the game back from Zynga after its closure was announced on January 10, 2014. The announcement of the game's closure led to months of organized virtual in-game protests, and boycott threats from passionate fans towards Zynga. Throughout these months, negotiations took place between Zynga and Big Viking Games, which eventually concluded with the decision to allow the game to continue running with Big Viking Games as its new developers. The acquisition came with re-branding the game, from YoVille to YoWorld.

== Gameplay ==
Within the virtual world, users can do a variety of things. These include purchasing new homes, decorating them, stylizing their avatar however they see fit, adopting pets, role-playing, meeting new people, and socializing. The game is a life-simulation, and players can live it as they see fit. To keep the game interesting, the developers regularly release new "themes" within the game. Themes are new furniture, clothing, pets, and housing lines that are released all in correlation with one another. Themes can be based on or inspired by a number of things, such as holidays, real-life locations, time periods and eras, stories and folklore, lifestyles, artistic movements, current events, and genres of fiction.

To make money, players can take on jobs, or perform daily tasks and collect bonuses, like opening free mystery chests they receive from friends. They can also participate in the game's virtual economy by buying, selling, and trading virtual goods, such as furniture and clothing. Watching ads is also another way of making free YoCoins within the game.

YoWorld has its own map filled with public locations, as well as various hangouts players can go to meet new people, such as, but not limited to, a vintage diner and a nightclub. YoWorlders can also make posts and participate in discussion on the YoWorld Forums, where they can give feedback for new themes, features, and assets they'd like to see in-game.

== History ==
- On May 8, 2008, YoVille was first launched, and the game opened its doors to the world of players.
- In July 2008, Tall Tree Games sold YoVille to Zynga, where the game was run by VP of Product Kyle Stewart and Zynga co-founder Justin Waldron. The team grew the user base from 10,000 daily active users at the time of purchase to over 5 million daily active users less than a year later. Zynga operated the game until March 2014.
- In 2009, YoVille forums, the official forums of YoVille was created for players at www.yoville.com. The site replaced forums located on both Myspace and Facebook. Later on, the site was brought down.
- In 2012, the V.I.P was released which enabled players to pay for a monthly subscription which allowed them to access exclusive items in the clothing and furniture stores with a discounted price. The cost of $17.99 allows the player either the clothing store or furniture store VIP and discount sections, 15 YoCash, and 1 free hair of their choice weekly (4 weeks a month). After 3 months of paying for VIP service, the player is allowed into both stores and both discount stores, 20 YoCash, and 2 hairs of their choice.
- The introduction of the Auction House in 2012 added another way to purchase items in the game. Later in 2013, it added an option to trade using YoCash.
- On January 10, 2014, Zynga announced that YoVille will be closed on March 31, 2014.
- Greg Thomson, creator of the YoVille game from London, Ontario, Canada, was featured on CBC Ontario Morning and when interviewed, he expressed interest in buying the game back. He said to the fans that he was "cautiously optimistic" about buying the game back.
- On March 5, 2014, Zynga announced that they are continuing the YoVille program & It will not shut down as previously planned.
- On April 24, 2014, Big Viking Games announced that discussions between both Big Viking Games and Zynga had come to a close. Big Viking Games announced on their Facebook page that they had successfully acquired and 'saved' YoVille. On May 12, YoVille was taken offline for 24 hours while data and information are transferred to Big Viking Game's servers. Due to copyrights YoVille is now formally known as YoWorld.
- On May 12, the game began its transformation from YoVille to YoWorld.
- On May 13, YoVille was re-launched as YoWorld.
- In 2016, the V.I.P feature was re-launched with different prices and features.
- Since the Re-launch of Yoworld, It has continued to thrive. With the player base that once exceeded 500,000+ daily users, fell to roughly 40,000 daily users before the purchase of the game by Big Viking Games. Since the purchase of YoWorld, the game's community has fallen to roughly 30,000 daily players.
