= RewardVille =

Retired virtual game currency

- Developer: Zynga
- Platform: Facebook

RewardVille is Zynga's defunct virtual in-game currency and rewards program. Launched in March 2011 and retired on 5 December 2012, the program allowed players to earn exclusive Zynga-specific points and coins that could be spent within Zynga games or used to unlock virtual goods for use in the games or to gift to other players. Players collected "zCoins" currency and "zPoints", which could be used to upgrade a user's Zynga status. Players could earn as many as 80 zPoints per game or 300 zPoints total in one day, by playing Zynga games.

RewardVille was available in French, Italian, German, Spanish, Portuguese, and English.

In a partnership with Lady Gaga, virtual items such as a Lady Gaga Gyrosphere in CityVille, a Lipstick Gun in Mafia Wars and a Paws Up Statue for FrontierVille were available in RewardVille. It was the first time Zynga had partnered with an artist to offer exclusive items.

In a partnership with Pizza Hut, a $5 or more donation to benefit the World Hunger Relief campaign gave players a choice of a Food Wagon for use in FarmVille, a Nutrition Center for use in CityVille, a Farm for use in Empires & Allies, or a Merino Sheep for use in The Pioneer Trail.
