= Gems with Friends =

2012 video game

- Developer(s): Zynga
- Platform(s): iOS, Android
- Release: September 6, 2012
- Genre(s): Puzzle
- Mode(s): Single-player with social features

Gems with Friends is a free, tile-matching video game for iOS by Zynga. It's the sixth entry in Zynga's 'With Friends' series of games with a global release.

== Gameplay ==
Gems with Friends is a turn-based game with timed rounds. Players also receive one free Power Gem for each game, which they can use as a wild card to combine with any two similar gems. During the game, players have three two-minute rounds, during which they drag and drop numbered gems as fast as possible. The goal is to match three gems to score points. Gems with Friends players can chat with other players, as they do in other 'With Friends' games.

== Release ==
Gems with Friends was released globally for iOS on September 6, 2012.

Gems with Friends is no longer available as a free iOS app or a $2 paid app.
