= FishVille =

- Developer: Zynga
- Platform: Internet
- Genre: Simulation
- Mode: Single-player with multiplayer interaction

FishVille is a defunct real-time aquarium simulation game developed by Zynga that was available as an application on the social-networking website Facebook. The game allowed members of Facebook to manage virtual aquariums by rearing fish. As of October 2011, FishVille had 1.6 million monthly active users. The game was discontinued on December 5, 2012.

== Gameplay ==
When users begin the game, they can start by choosing a background and gravel for their aquariums. The users start with four fish already present in their tank. A tutorial then commences which takes the user through some of the basic functions of the game which include adding fish to the aquarium, feeding and selling fish. Upon selling fish, the user earns "sand coins" and experience points (XP). The player also earns XP and coins for completing certain tasks and helping in neighbor missions. At certain XP benchmarks, the player's level rises. As the player obtains more items and progresses through levels, fish, decorations, environments, creatures and plants become available to them via the "store" where items can be purchased using either sand coins or "sand dollars". Sand dollars are earned by leveling up, completing offers or microtransactions.

== Fish ==
Fish rearing is the main activity in FishVille. Players can buy fish from the store using sand dollars or sand coins. Fish can also be added into the aquarium by receiving gifts sent by neighbors and Facebook friends. Fish require to be fed as they age. Each fish has three stages of growth – Baby, Junior and Adult. Once the fish become junior or adult fish they can be sold for coins and XP. The XP and coins earned by selling the fish depends on the type of fish. If the fish are not fed, they become sick and then eventually die.

Players can purchase up to eight additional tanks if their tanks run out of space. Recently, Zynga launched a new feature in FishVille called "Arena Tanks". In an Arena tank a user can place fish which are classified as arena or super arena. These fish can then be trained using "super foods" which help improve certain traits of the fish which include IQ, Strength, Agility and Health. The fish then can "combat" with other arena fish which helps the player gain XP, coins and other rewards.

== Decorations and other items ==
In addition to fish, players can also place decorations, plants and creatures to deck out their tanks. These additional items can be purchased from the store with the in-game currency or can be acquired through the game's gifting mechanism. The FishVille store has a vast array of decorations and creatures which get unlocked and are available for purchase as the user levels up in the game.

The store also allows the user to change the environment (wallpaper) and gravel of the tank.

The FishVille store is constantly updated with new items and content. Items are also added for seasons and for special themes. Special themes when added, provide players with the opportunity to decorate the tank with items related to a particular season or theme.

== Social interaction ==
Like most Zynga games, FishVille incorporates the social networking aspect of Facebook into many areas of gameplay. Players may invite their friends to be their neighbors, allowing them to perform certain actions on each other's tanks per day by "visiting" it. Neighbors may also send gifts and other supplies like medicine to each other and complete specialized tasks together for rewards.

Through the FishVille Forums and FishVille fan page, weekly contests like "Tank of the Week" are held where users can provide screenshots of their tanks and can compete for prizes. Prizes often range from "Sand Dollars" to "exclusive fish".

== Reception ==
Jim Squires, from GameZebo, said that the game was "easily one of Facebook's greatest underwater adventures" and that "FishVille offers up a perfect blend of familiarity and freshness that any fish lover can enjoy". Ryan Geddes, from IGN, stated that the game is an incredibly efficient advertising and microtransaction delivery tool".

== Discontinuation ==
Sometime in November 2012, it was announced that FishVille would be discontinued on December 5, 2012 along with several other Zynga games.
