= Chartboost =

Mobile game advertising platform

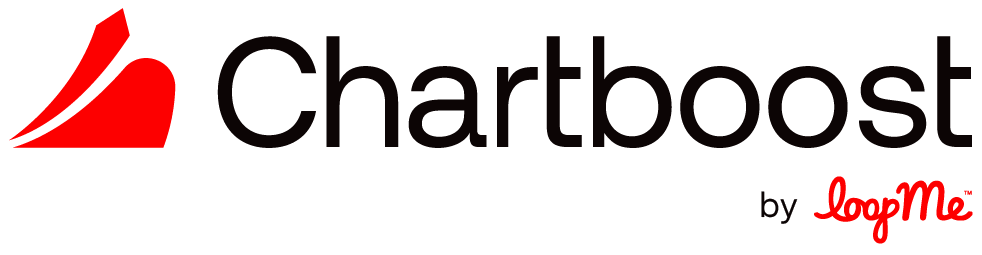
- Type: Private
- Industry: Mobile apps, Mobile games, Mobile advertising, Advertising technology
- Founded: 2011; 15 years ago
- Founder: Maria Alegre, Sean Fannan
- Headquarters: United States
- Key people: Stephen Upstone (CEO); Marco van de Bergh (CTO); Maggie Mesa (SVP, Global Business Development)
- Parent: Loopme
- Website: loopme.ai/chartboost

Chartboost is an in-app programmatic advertising and monetization platform. Chartboost SDK enables developers to monetize on their mobile apps and connect advertisers to global in-app inventory. Chartboost's platform allows video game developers to create customized interstitial and video ads to promote new games. Developers have direct access to game data derived from Chartboost-enabled games. As of 2016, Chartboost had been integrated into more than 300,000 games with 40 billion game sessions per month.

In 2019, Chartboost ranked on a return on investment index, scoring 6th position on Android and 14th on iOS, behind mobile ad networks run by Google, Facebook, Unity Technologies, Aarki and Vungle.

In May 2021, Zynga acquired Chartboost for $250 million.

In December 2024, Zynga sold Chartboost to LoopMe, an AI-powered adtech company. Financial details of the transaction were not disclosed.

== Use and features ==
Game developers use the Chartboost platform for monetization purposes; that is, to generate revenue, build user bases, negotiate business deals with other developers, as well as to monitor the data associated with these activities.

Chartboost Monetization includes:

- In-app bidding
- Premier demand sources
- Support for a variety of ad formats (e.g. video, rewarded, interstitial, banner)
- Reporting on key metrics such as ad requests, impressions, eCPMs, fill rate and auction data

== History ==
Chartboost was launched in 2011 by Maria Alegre (co-founder) and Sean Fannan (CTO). After departing from Tapulous, the co-founders set out to create an own self-developed platform that allowed game developers to have complete transparency and control over the promotion, sale, revenue, and management of their mobile games.

In January 2013 Chartboost announced a $19 million Series B funding round led by Sequoia Capital.

In April 2013 Chartboost opened its first international office in Amsterdam.

In February 2016 Chartboost acquired Roostr to connect mobile games with YouTube influencers. Roostr was rebranded to Chartboost Influence and then both were shut down (that is, Chartboost exited the influencer market).

In May 2021, Zynga acquired Chartboost for $250 million.

Following the acquisition by LoopMe in December 2024, Chartboost was added to LoopMe's Intelligent Marketplace offering.

== Recognition ==
- In 2013, Maria Alegre was listed in Forbes Magazine’s 30 under 30 list in "Marketing & Advertising".
- In 2013, Maria Alegre was listed by El País as one of the Top 100 Most Relevant People of the year.
- In 2014, Chartboost was listed in the VentureBeat Index Report as one of the top 10 mobile advertising companies.
- In 2014, Maria Alegre was listed in Forbes Magazine's 30 under 30 list of "The Brightest Young Stars in Video Games".
- In 2014, Chartboost was named "Best Places to Work" by the San Francisco Business Times.
