= Hidden Chronicles =

2012 video game

- Developer: Zynga
- Platform: Facebook
- Genre: Hidden Object Social Game
- Mode: Single-player with multiplayer interactions

Hidden Chronicles is a defunct hidden object social game developed by Zynga and released in January 2012. It's available for play on the Facebook platform. It is Zynga's first hidden object game. Players earn points by finding hidden objects within scenes. Additional scenes are unlocked with reputation points earned by interacting with friends. The game is a freemium game, meaning there is no cost to play but players have the option of purchasing premium content.

Within the game is a narrative. Players are told their late uncle, Geoffrey, has summoned them to his estate, Ramsey Manor. Players then move through the estate and mansion, unlocking new areas. Players can see hidden areas of the game in order to unlock them and progress through higher levels. The game also includes memory games.

The game was closed on 23 July 2014.
