= Overtime (sports network) =

American sports media company

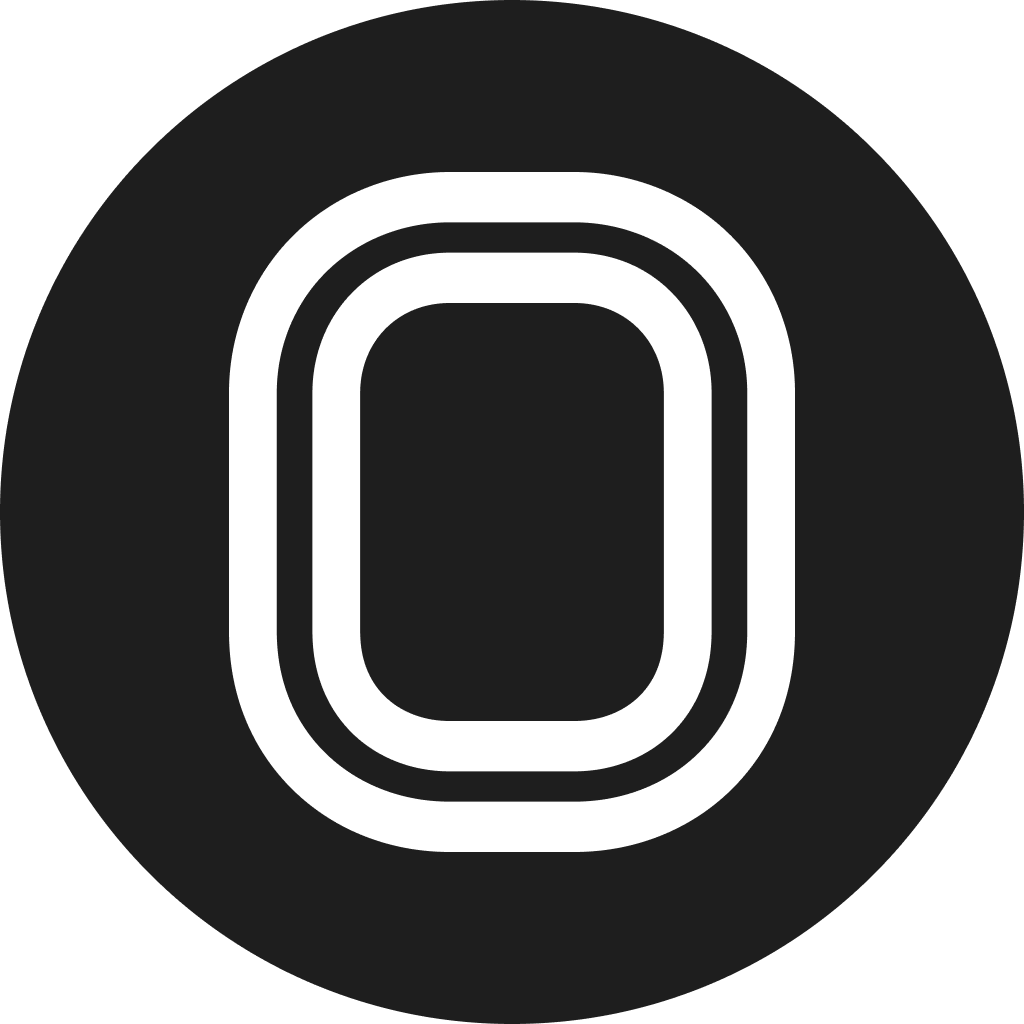
- Type: Sports Media
- Founded: 2016
- Founder: Dan Porter; Zack Weiner
- Key people: Dan Porter (Co-Founder); Zack Weiner (Co-Founder)
- Owner: Overtime Sports Inc.
- Website: www.overtime.tv

Overtime is a sports media company geared towards Generation Z sports fans. The company distributes original sports content on social media outlets, including Facebook, Snapchat, and YouTube and sells apparel with its logos and branding. In 2021, Overtime launched Overtime Elite, a professional basketball league for 16-19 year-olds. In June 2022, Overtime launched OT7, a low-contact, seven-on-seven American football league. In August 2023, Overtime held its first Overtime Boxing (OTX) matches at Overtime Elite Arena in Atlanta.

== History ==
Overtime was founded in late 2016 by Dan Porter and Zack Weiner.

Initially, Overtime focused on short-form content of high school athletes captured on iPhone technology developed by Porter and Weiner. Overtime's social content helped grow the popularity of NBA stars including Zion Wiliamson and Trae Young. The company has expanded its offerings to include medium and long-form content. In 2021, Overtime announced the launch of OT Films with docuseries on Cade Cunningham and Justin Fields and a college athlete creator studio with its first project being an original series with Space Jam 2 star Ceyair Wright.

In February 2017, Overtime raised a $2.5 million seed round with Greycroft and former NBA commissioner David Stern contributing.

In February 2018, Overtime raised a $9.5 million Series A round with Andreessen Horowitz, BoxGroup, Kevin Durant, and returning investor Greycroft contributing.

In February 2019, Overtime raised a $23 million Series B round with Spark Capital, MSG Network, Sapphire Ventures, Victor Oladipo, Carmelo Anthony, Baron Davis, and returning investor Andreessen Horowitz contributing.

In March 2019, Overtime announced a partnership with MSG Network to develop simulcasts for NBA games.

In April 2021, Overtime raised an $80 million Series C round with Jeff Bezos, Alexis Ohanian, Drake, Devin Booker, Klay Thompson, Trae Young, and Pau Gasol contributing.

In March 2022, Overtime announced plans to launch a low-contact, seven-on-seven football league, OT7, with Cam Newton investing in the league. OT7 officially launched in June 2022.

In May 2022, Daymond John joined Overtime's board of directors.

In August 2022, Overtime raised a $100 million Series D round with Liberty Media Corporation and returning investor Jeff Bezos contributing.

In September 2022, Overtime announced a partnership with FootballCo to develop branded content for the 2022 FIFA World Cup.

in October 2023, Overtime announced a multi-year partnership with Adidas as the exclusive apparel and footwear sponsor of Overtime Elite, OT7, and Overtime Select.

In November 2023, Overtime and the NFL announced a partnership that will give Overtime behind-the-scenes access to make content at key events, including the Super Bowl, Pro Bowl, Combine, and Draft. It's the brand's first content deal with one of the four major U.S. sports leagues.

In March 2026, co-founder Dan Porter departed Overtime.

== Overtime Elite ==
Overtime launched the Overtime Elite professional basketball league in 2021 for high school basketball players and international players between the ages of 16–19. Players receive a minimum salary of $100,000 annually, a signing bonus, and shares in Overtime's larger business. The company provides health and disability insurance and sets aside $100,000 in college scholarship money for each player if they decide not to pursue professional basketball afterwards.

Overtime Elite built a 103,000 square-foot facility in Atlanta where players train, study, and compete. Athletes participate in an academic program featuring a 4:1 student-teacher ratio and a curriculum offering traditional high school subjects alongside life skill-related subjects in financial literacy, social media and other media training, and mental health and wellness.

Overtime Elite consists of 27 players divided into three teams who compete against each other and prep and postgraduate opponents. The three teams play in a playoff and finals in March.

In April 2021, Overtime Elite hired former NBA player, University of Connecticut head coach, and NCAA Champion Kevin Ollie as its first head coach and head of player development.

In May 2021, Overtime Elite announced the signings of Matt and Ryan Bewley, the first prep underclassmen to sign contracts with an American professional basketball league. The league also signed Dominican guard Jean Montero in June 2021 as its first international player and 16-year-old Jalen Lewis, the youngest American professional basketball player in history, in July 2021.

In September 2021, Overtime Elite announced an exclusive partnership with Topps to create basketball trading cards on Overtime Elite athletes, marking the return of Topps to basketball trading cards. In October 2021, Overtime Elite announced Gatorade as a brand partner.

In July 2022, Pau Gasol joined the Overtime Elite board.

== OT7 ==
Overtime launched OT7, a low-contact, seven-on-seven American football league with Cam Newton, in June 2022. The first OT7 season was held in June 2022 in Las Vegas, Nevada. The first season featured 18 seven-on-seven teams from around the U.S. Participants included top-ranked quarterbacks Malachi Nelson, Dante Moore, Nico Iamaleava, and Jaden Rashada. Over 100 Power Five recruits participated in the first season. The South Florida Express defeated Cam Newton's C1N in the OT7 finals.

In its second season, OT7 expanded to add four divisional events in Baltimore, Orlando, Austin and Phoenix. In March 2024, it announced a partnership with the NFL to stream the games on NFL Media properties.

== OTX ==
In February 2023, Overtime launched Overtime Boxing (OTX), with four-event fight series in August 2023 at Overtime Elite Arena in Atlanta, Georgia, aired exclusively on DAZN. Nutrabolt and its drink brand C4 Energy were named the first sponsor in a multiyear deal.

On August 4, 2023, OTX held their first five fights at OTE Arena. In the main event Super Bantamweight Elijah Pierce knocked out Mike Plania in the third round. In the co-main event, Olympic Bronze medalist, Welterweight Oshae Jones won a decision over Miranda Barber to capture the North American Boxing Federation title.

In January 2024, OTX announced an eight-event schedule with the first fight on March 29 at OTE Arena in Atlanta.

== Overtime Select ==
In October 2023, Overtime launched Overtime Select, a four-week league for elite high school girls basketball players taking place during the summer of 2024 at OTE Arena in Atlanta, Georgia. Top high school players participating in Overtime Select include Aaliyah Chavez (No. 1 in the 2025 class), Jazzy Davidson (No. 2, 2025), Jenica Lewis (No. 23, 2026) and twin sisters Mia (No. 7, 2025) and Mya Pauldo (No. 24, 2025).

Overtime Select advisors include current and former players Seimone Augustus, Paige Bueckers, Napheesa Collier, Breanna Stewart and Kahleah Copper, as well as notable agents and business executives Lindsay Kagawa Colas, Erin Kane, Lauren Maillian and Pamela Neferkara.
