= Draw Something =

Mobile app developed by Omgpop

- A representation of onions in the app
- Developer(s): OMGPop
- Stable release: 2.4.7 / July 31, 2015; 10 years ago
- Operating system: iOS 5.1.1 or later, Android 2.3 or later, Windows Phone
- Website: omgpop.com/drawsomething

Draw Something was a video game developed by OMGPop based on its browser game Draw My Thing, launched on February 6, 2012. It won a Flurry App Spotlight Award in 2012. In the first five weeks after its launching, the game was downloaded 20 million times. On March 21, 2012, both Draw Something and OMGPop were bought by the gaming company Zynga for $180 million. The game's popularity peaked on the day of the sale at 15 million daily active users, but then dropped to 10 million by early May.

The game was available in a free version, which showed interstitial advertisements between games; a standard version which had no advertisements between games, but allowed the player to obtain bombs in exchange for watching advertisements; and a more expensive Pro version for the iPad which offers unlimited bombs.

On April 25, 2013, Draw Something 2 was released for iOS. However, both games are no longer available.

== Gameplay ==
Two players take turns drawing a picture of a given word, after which their partner must guess the word from the drawing.

The person drawing will always have a choice of three words worth one, two and three stars. The words given are random, and the more valuable the word the more difficult it will usually be to represent in a drawing (for example, "circle" might be a one-star word, whereas "lion" might be worth two-stars, and a more abstract idea like "stress" could be three-stars).

After the player has finished drawing, the guesser will view a stroke by stroke replay of the drawing, without the pauses in between. The guesser is given a number of blank spaces representing the number of letters in the word, and a selection of scrambled letters, which include all the letters of the word plus some more letters which are not in the word. The guesser gets unlimited tries and time to use these letters and attempt enter the guess word. The drawer gets an opportunity to watch their partner guess the drawing as it is replayed. Each player is given a number of "bombs". As a guesser, the bomb eliminates letters which are not part of the answer; as a drawer, the bomb gives a new set of guess words to choose from. If the guesser cannot guess the word, they can "pass", forfeiting the game. This breaks the pair's winning streak.

As of December 15, 2022, Draw Something is no longer available in the App Store.

== Board game ==
In 2012, Zynga, in conjunction with Hasbro, released a physical board game version of Draw Something under the "Hasbro Gaming" imprint. This is one of several games in the Zynga game library to be released as physical board game versions. Others include Words with Friends, a CityVille edition of Monopoly and several kids' games based on FarmVille.

== See also ==
- List of most downloaded Android applications
