= Tribe.net =

Social networking website

tribe.net

- tribe.net logo
- Website type: Social network
- Website: tribe.net
- Commercial: Yes
- Registration: Yes
- Launched: 2003
- Current status: defunct

tribe.net (often shortened to "tribe") was a website that hosted an online community, or tribe of friends, similar to other social networking sites. The site name was always spelled in all lower case. As of February 2017 the site content was inaccessible and the site lacked a host. As of 25 February 2023, the tribe.net domain hosts a Mastodon server.

== History ==
Tribe was founded in early 2003 by Paul Martino, Mark Pincus, and Valerie Syme. As of March 2004, the population of tribe was skewed heavily towards people living in the San Francisco Bay Area, though the geographic distribution is gradually normalizing as people from other places join. As of September 2006, it had over 500,000 members.

In a controversial move, on December 20, 2005, tribe.net decided to prohibit sexually explicit content, partially in response to the Child Protection and Obscenity Enforcement Act. This move disappointed many users, as Tribe to that point had been notable for a permissive content policy.

On January 19, 2006, tribe.net changed its layout and user interface (UI). The management of tribe.net claimed that they received approximately 40% positive feedback during a small beta phase with 3000 users.

In April, 2006, most of the employees of Tribe.net were laid off, leaving only a skeleton group to maintain and develop the site.

On August 24, 2006, former CEO Mark Pincus announced that he was "taking back tribe." He did this through a public listing on the site. This happened due to the financial insolvency of the initial company. Mark formed a new corporation, Utah Street Networks, that bought the distressed assets of the original company, Tribe Networks.

In late 2007, at the request of many members, tribe.net announced that it would offer a premium service to members on a subscription basis, at the rate of US$5.00 per month. Prospective premium members were told that they would be able to view the website in an ad-free format. It also promised free T-shirts to annual members, a benefit that has never fully been disbursed.

A September 24, 2008 article in the San Francisco Weekly quoted Pincus as saying that the site would continue. "I feel a commitment to the community of people who have made the decision to post themselves on Tribe," the Weekly quoted Pincus. "We've kept Tribe going not because we believed it would turn into a phenomenal business success like Bebo or Facebook, but because I think it serves a really valuable role for the community." tribe.net was taken offline in March 2017 after an article on Heavy.com about a Reddit thread described child porn activity on the network.

While development director Carolyn Anhalt told the Black Rock Beacon in 2017 that the site was “gone for good” she said the concept might be resurrected. “We have not completely given up the hope to have a sustainable social network that supports anonymity and free speech."

In February 2022, the domain name was pointed to a list of charities supporting Ukraine. In November 2022, a new Mastodon (software) server was brought up under the tribe.net domain name, https://tribe.net/about.

== Features ==
Anyone could register as a new tribe user, and then define their immediate network of friends, either by choosing from existing members or by inviting new members to join. Each of these users may in turn define their own network of friends. (This process results in a type of user-driven viral marketing on behalf of tribe.net.) As more and more people and their friends joined tribe, it resulted in an elaborate computerized social network with many thousands of members. tribe users leveraged the small world phenomenon as a way to enhance their own immediate network.

tribe.net features many "tribes", loosely based on the theory of urban tribes propounded by Michel Maffesoli and Ethan Watters. In practice, these tribes are a kind of topical forum. A new tribe may be created by any registered user. When a user creates a new tribe, that user is the moderator of the tribe. Any user may in principle join any tribe, although some tribes are private or require permission from the moderator to join. In addition to threaded messages, members can use tribes to post photos, announce upcoming parties, concerts, or other events easily and reach select audiences. Currently there are thousands of tribes, with more added daily.

Tribe content fell into several different categories: Topics (discussion threads), photos (uploaded by users), listings (classified ads), events (scheduled happenings), reviews (of websites), requests (more classified ads), and olx (link to OLX, a separate website of classified ads).

== Ownership ==
Tribe Networks, the original company behind tribe.net, was formerly privately owned, financed largely with venture capital. Tribe partnered with the Washington Post and Knight Ridder. In 2006, a new company called Utah Street Networks was formed to buy the assets of Tribe Networks and continue operation of the site. This transition was largely transparent to the users of the site, but largely coincides with the "taking back Tribe" message posted by Pincus.

In March 2007, Cisco Systems announced their acquisition of Tribe Networks' technology assets.

In November 2008, Utah Street turned over management of tribe to New Systems Associates, a group of users who planned to stabilize the site and expand its services. New Systems attempted to rewrite the Tribe software so that it would no longer need to license it from Cisco. Once that was complete, Pincus was to transfer the assets to New Systems, Carolyn Anhalt, the company's director of development and technical support, told the Black Rock Beacon in 2015.

In 2010, the combination of a dispute with contract programmers and the loss of advertising from a major server that objected to pornographic content on the site derailed the rewrite. The site suffered from spotty service as its software became increasingly incompatible with current technology.

== See also ==
- List of social networking websites
- Tribe (internet)
