= Metropolitan Corporate Academy =

Public school in New York City

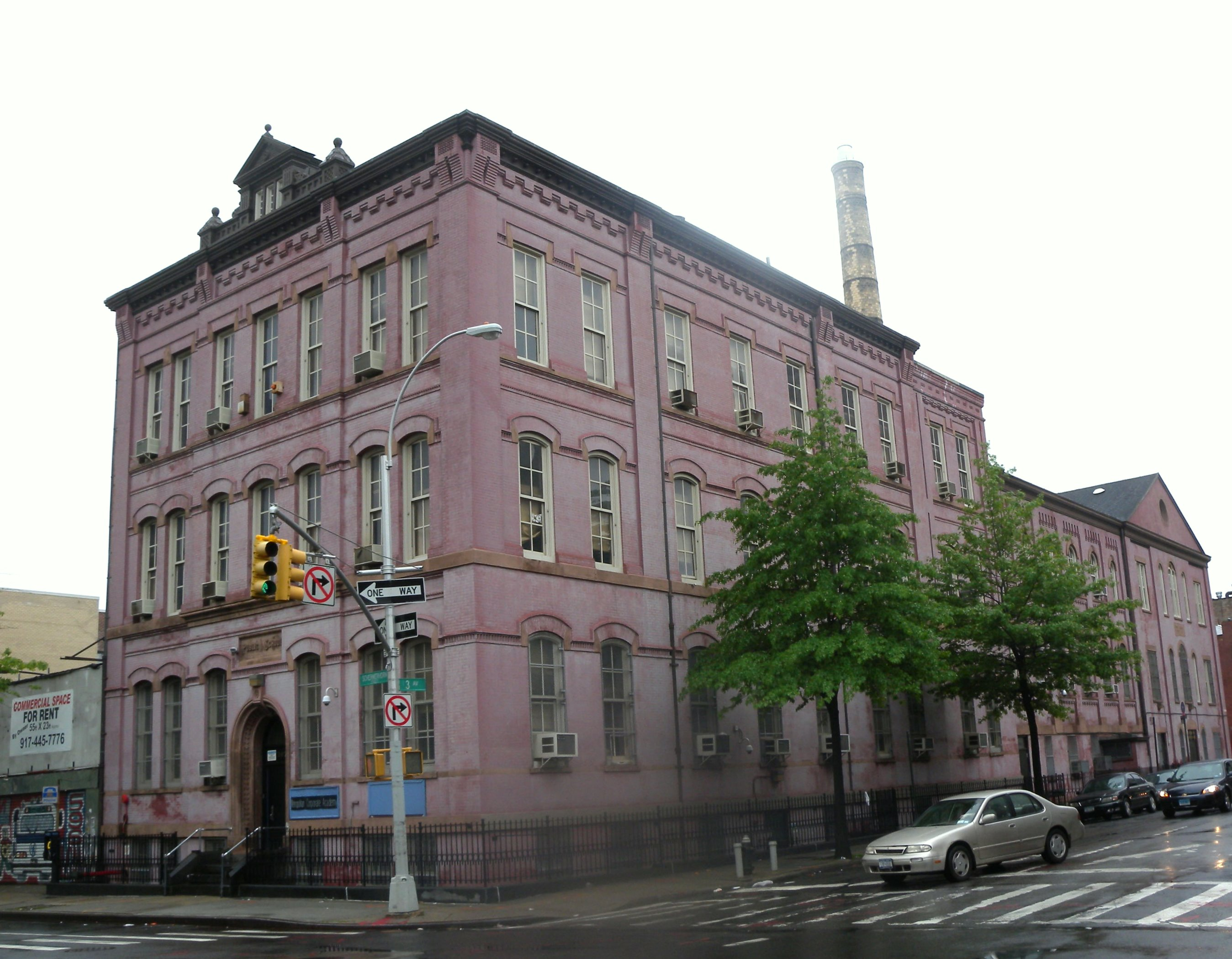

Location
- 362 Schermerhorn St. Brooklyn, New York City, New York 11217; United States; 40°41′12″N 73°58′49″W

Information
- School type: Public high school
- Principal: Lennel George
- Faculty: 29 Full-Time Teachers
- Grades: 9–12
- Enrollment: Approximately 420 Students
- Campus type: urban
- Colors: Blue and White
- Mascot: Lion
- Information: (718) 222-6200
- Website: http://schools.nyc.gov/SchoolPortals/15/K530/default.htm

Metropolitan Corporate Academy (MCA) was a public high school in Downtown Brooklyn, New York City. It had approximately 400 students, grades 9–12. The principal was Lennel George. It was founded in February 1992 by New York City in partnership with Goldman Sachs.

Classes at MCA were held at a three-story brick building which used to be a Civil War infirmary.
