= Zynga Poker =

- Developer: Zynga
- Designers: Justin Waldron; Eric Schiermeyer
- Programmers: Michael Luxton; Justin Waldron
- Platforms: Facebook, Android, iOS (iPad, iPhone, iPod Touch), Google+, Windows Phone, Windows
- Genre: Poker card game
- Mode: Multiplayer

Zynga Poker is a social game developed by Zynga as an application for the social-networking website Facebook as well as Android, iPhone, Windows Phone, Windows, MySpace, Tagged, and Google+. It was launched in July 2007.

In 2011, with 38 million players, Zynga Poker was the largest poker site in the world. In 2018, after increased competition in the market, Zynga Poker had a 6.1% market share in social casino games.

== Gameplay ==
The game allows Facebook players to simulate playing Texas Hold 'em poker in a social gaming environment. Users enter a casino lobby and can play at any table or join friends for a game. Players can choose from casual tables, tournament play, or VIP tables. A leader board shows players how they compare in chip ranking to other players and allows players to send or receive gifts. A 2019 virtual ethnographic study of the game identified design features such as pop-up prompts to purchase additional chips after a loss, which researchers compared to loss-chasing mechanics associated with problem gambling.

== History ==
=== Development and market dominance ===
It was created and launched in July 2007 by a team consisting of some of the founders of the company including Justin Waldron, Michael Luxton, and Eric Schiermeyer.

In March 2011, Zynga Poker hosted PokerCon, a live poker tournament at the Palms Casino in Las Vegas, Nevada. According to a March 2011 ESPN article, with 38 million players, Zynga Poker at that time was the largest poker site in the world.

In July 2012, Zynga announced that it would be providing real-money gaming outside of United States in 2013.

According to a 2014 article by Dean Takahashi, about 350 million have played Zynga Poker, and the game has millions of daily players.

=== Update and loss of market dominance ===
In 2014, the game underwent a major redesign that, according to VentureBeat, proved unpopular with users who felt Zynga had added too many unwanted features to core gameplay. That year Zynga Poker held an estimated 61 percent of the social poker revenue market, earning $9–13 million monthly, though its audience fell by 44%. Facing user objections, Zynga restored an earlier "classic" version of the game, and its chief executive and head of games left the company around the same time. By 2015, VentureBeat reported that players were increasingly shifting to social casino games, a trend it linked to the app's declining position.

=== Recent features and events ===
In the first quarter of 2017, the company reported a loss, although revenue was rising compared to the year prior. Zynga Poker accounted for 23% of Zynga's game revenue in 2018, though increased competition reduced its social casino market share to 6.1% that year. In November 2018, mobile revenue was down 3% for the year, with bookings flat. Zynga attributed the decline to platform changes Facebook made earlier that year. At the time, the game was engaged in an ongoing partnership with the World Poker Tour.

Zynga Poker represented 15% of Zynga's total revenue in the first quarter of 2019, down from 21% a year earlier. In March 2019, the game introduced a "Spin & Win" tournament mode in its World Poker Tour Tournament Center, combining poker with a prize wheel for faster play at higher stakes. That September, the company partnered with actor Brad Garrett for a sweepstakes event. According to Consumer Affairs, Zynga Poker users were affected by a data breach in 2019. The breach was later found to have compromised more than 170 million Zynga accounts across the company's game portfolio, including Zynga Poker.

Zynga reported a slight overall profit for 2019, though Zynga Poker's profit fell by 7%, a decline the company attributed to its continued recovery from the prior year's Facebook platform changes.

=== Acquisition by Take-Two Interactive ===
In January 2022, Take-Two Interactive agreed to acquire Zynga in a cash-and-stock deal valued at approximately $12.7 billion. The acquisition closed on May 23, 2022, making Zynga Poker part of Take-Two's mobile games portfolio alongside other Zynga titles such as FarmVille and Words with Friends.

== Languages and availability ==
As of August 2010, the game is available in Mandarin Chinese in China as well as on Facebook in Hong Kong and Taiwan under the name Zynga Texas Poker. The game is also available in English, Indonesian, Spanish, Portuguese, Turkish, and French. The mobile version of the game is available in 18 languages.

== Sponsorships ==
In 2018, Nascar announced that Go Fas Racing was partnering with Zynga Poker, with the game serving as primary sponsor for the No. 32 Ford and Matt DiBenedetto.
