= CityVille =

2010 video game

- Developer: Zynga
- Platform: Adobe Flash
- Release: Facebook; December 2, 2010 Tencent; July 26, 2011 Google+ September 26, 2011
- Genres: City-building, construction and management simulation
- Mode: Single-player with multiplayer interaction

Screenshot from CityVille

CityVille was a casual social city-building game developed by Zynga, and released in December 2010.

A sequel, CityVille 2, was released in December 2012. It was closed down in February 2013 just three months after the game's release.

CityVille was shut down on April 30, 2015. Players had been given a notice when opening the game prior to the shutdown.

== Gameplay ==
CityVille allows players to become the owner of a virtual city and to oversee its development into a large metropolis. The city can grow with various tasks to be performed. The amount of energy available increases as the player gains in experience levels, up to a maximum of 30 or 38 with the dam addition and up to 47 with the addition of the wind farm. The energy points are replenished automatically at a constant rate of one energy every five minutes.

The player can also visit their neighbor's city and perform up to five different jobs every 12 hours. This gives the player reputation points. The points provide the player with a free goods bonus and one or two heart requests with each reputation level-up. Points increase the amount of energy, experience level and coins bonuses available on a daily basis. Players can send other players gifts and help them in some of their goals. The main task of the game is to complete goals, which can be seen on the top left corner of the screen and earn City Coins. Players can also buy goods, sell goods (supplying goods to other players' cities if their business branches are in their cities), and produce their own goods by farming and shipping. CityVille initially had 80 experience levels, which was increased to 90 experience levels and again to 200 experience levels.

In September 2012, Zynga began rolling out CityVille Lakefront, the biggest CityVille expansion to date, to players Level 25 or above. In CityVille Lakefront, players can build a canal and a drawbridge at the same time. CityVille Lakefront gives players more room to build, more buildings, and new challenges. Players build roads and sidewalks to expand their current city out to the drawbridge, which connects the lakefront to the player’s city.

== Development ==
CityVille was announced November 18, 2010, but the launch date was moved to December to allow Zynga to make adjustments to the game.

The game had 100,000 players on its launch day, making it Zynga's largest launch ever at the time of its release. On January 2, 2011, CityVille reached the most monthly active users for an application ever on Facebook, beating FarmVille's previous record although numbers may drop as its release date was exactly a month prior. Within its first 50 days, CityVille grew to 61 million monthly active users.

CityVille became available as a game on Google+ in late September 2011, as announced on the Google main page on September 26, 2011.

=== Partnerships ===
Several major music artists promoted their albums using CityVille. Lady Gaga items were available via RewardVille for a limited time. Enrique Iglesias also made his CityVille appearance in October 2011, giving players a task to build Enrique's Euphoria Arena. The arena is an attraction in CityVille, and an avatar of Enrique can be seen performing while the arena is open. Another event promoted was the Michael Jackson: The Immortal World Tour. Players had the opportunity to place an arena and play a concert. A Michael Bublé promotion was released in December 2011 where players could build a bonfire and host a concert.

Business franchises have appeared in CityVille, allowing players to build replica shops for fixed periods of time. These brands are Beneful, Best Buy, Bing, Capital One, Coca-Cola, Embassy Suites, Energizer, Falken Tire, McDonald's, Pandora Radio, Progressive Corporation, Toyota and Twix.

== Editions ==
=== CityVille 2 ===
In December 2012, Zynga launched the 3D CityVille 2. The game reached 50,000 players before being cancelled on February 5, 2013.

=== CityVille Hometown ===
ZYNGA has also developed a mobile version of the game, CityVille Hometown which is available for the iPhone and iPad; however, the mobile game is not connected to the web game. Like other CityVille games, this game is no longer available.

=== CityVille Monopoly ===
In 2012, Zynga, in conjunction with Hasbro, released a CityVille edition of Monopoly under the "Hasbro Gaming" imprint. It is essentially a variant of the Monopoly City board game, with its elements retooled to reflect those used in the CityVille online games. The goal is to be the first player to own four skyscrapers by building up your neighborhoods.

This is one of several games in the Zynga game library to be released as physical board game versions. Others include Draw Something, Words with Friends and several kids' games based on FarmVille.

== Awards ==
During the 14th Annual Interactive Achievement Awards, the Academy of Interactive Arts & Sciences awarded CityVille with "Social Networking Game of the Year".
