= Mark Pincus =

American Internet entrepreneur (born 1966)

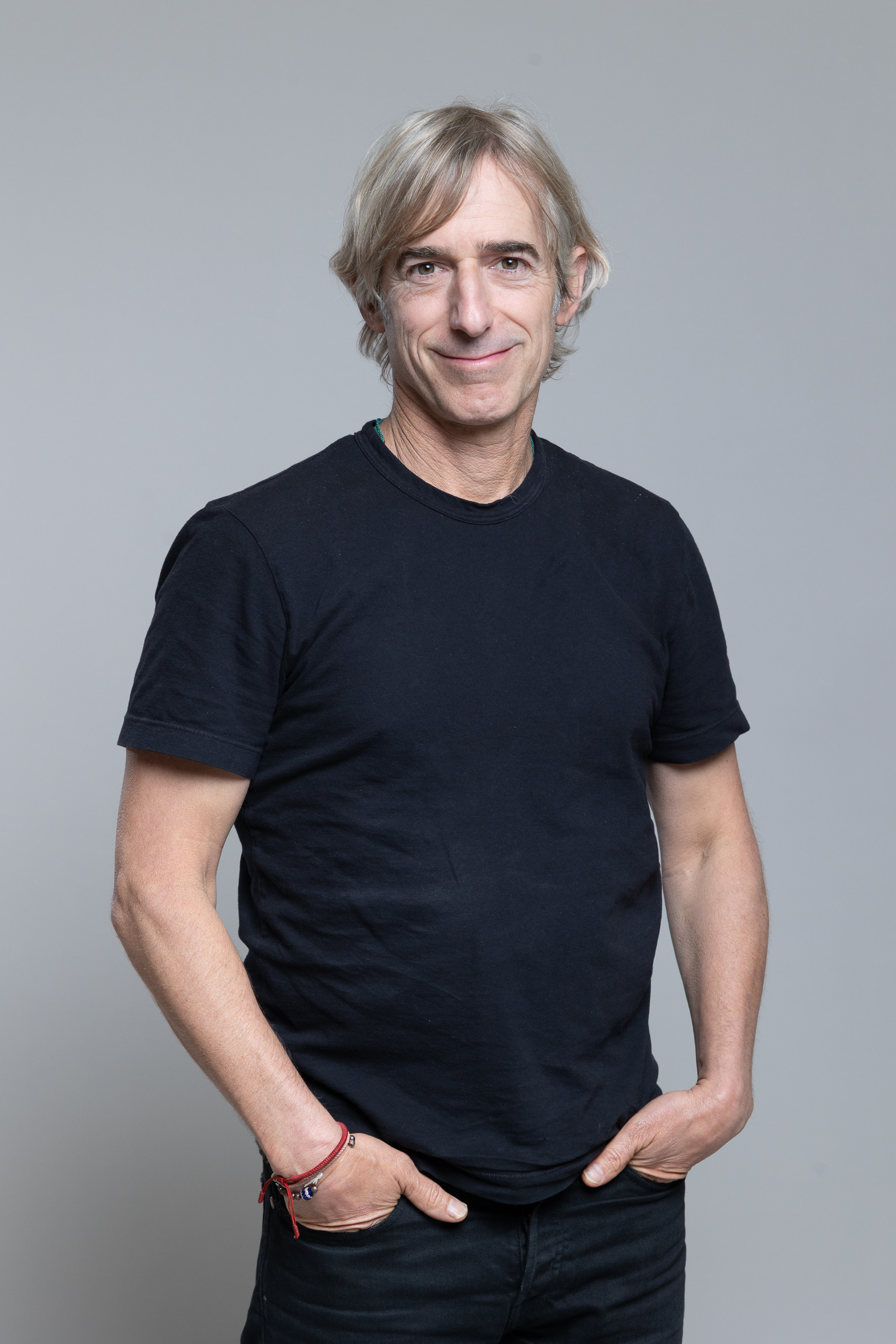
- Pincus in 2025
- Born: February 13, 1966 (age 60); Chicago, Illinois, U.S.
- Education: University of Pennsylvania (BS); Harvard University (MBA)
- Occupations: Executive Chairman at Zynga; Former CEO & CPO at Zynga
- Spouse: Alison Gelb (m. 2008; div. 2017)
- Children: 5

Mark Jonathan Pincus (born February 13, 1966) is an American Internet entrepreneur known as the founder of Zynga, a mobile social gaming company. Pincus also founded the startups Freeloader, Inc., Tribe Networks, and Support.com. Pincus was the CEO of Zynga until July 2013, then again from 2015 to 2016.

Pincus was named 2009 "CEO of the Year" at The Crunchies technology awards and a year later was named Founder of the Year at the 2010 ceremony. Zynga is considered to be the pioneer of the social gaming industry. In 2011, Zynga went public with a $1 billion initial public offering. Pincus co-founded Reinvent Capital in 2018, an investment firm, with Reid Hoffman and hedge fund manager Michael Thompson. He co-created the Stanford Graduate School of Business course on Product Management with Professor Amir Goldberg.

== Early life and education ==
Pincus' family lived in the Lincoln Park neighborhood of Chicago. He is the son of Donna (née Forman) and Theodore Pincus, and is Jewish. His father was a business columnist and public relations adviser to CEOs and politicians, and his mother was an artist and architect.

Pincus attended Francis W. Parker School from kindergarten through 12th grade and graduated in 1984. He graduated summa cum laude with a Bachelor of Science degree in Economics from the Wharton School of the University of Pennsylvania earned in 1988 and an MBA from Harvard Business School, where he founded the Communications Club with Sherry Coutu.

== Career ==
=== Financial services ===
Before he became an entrepreneur, Pincus worked in venture capital and financial services for six years. After graduating from Wharton, Pincus spent two years working as an analyst in the New Media Group at Lazard Freres & Co. After that time, he moved to Hong Kong, where he was a vice president for Asian Capital Partners for two years.

He returned to the United States in order to attend Harvard Business School (HBS) where he was a contemporary of Chris Hohn, Guy Spier and Chris Shumway. He graduated in 1993 and also spent a summer as an associate for Bain & Co. in 1992.

After Pincus graduated from Harvard Business School, he took a job as a manager of corporate development at Tele-Communications, Inc., which is now AT&T Cable. A year later, he joined Columbia Capital as vice president, where he led investments in new media and software startups in Washington, D.C. for a year.

=== Entrepreneur ===
==== Freeloader ====
In 1995, Pincus co-founded his first startup, Freeloader, Inc with Sunil Paul. Freeloader was backed by Fred Wilson and Softbank. The company was acquired seven months after its launch by Individual, Inc., for $38 million. Sean Parker worked as a summer intern at Freeloader when he was 14 years old. He later went on to co-found Napster, and Pincus became Napster's first investor with an investment of $100,000.

==== Support.com ====
He then started his second company, Support.com, in August 1997. As chairman and CEO, Pincus built the company into a leading provider of help desk software. The company went public in July 2000 at a $1.5 billion valuation. In 2002, the company changed its name from Support.com to SupportSoft, Inc.

==== Tribe.net ====
In 2003, at age 37, Pincus founded his third startup, Tribe.net, an early social network. Tribe.net partnered with major local newspapers and was backed by The Washington Post, Knight Ridder Digital, and Mayfield Fund and Guy Spier,. In 2007, Cisco Systems acquired the core technology of Tribe.net to develop a social networking platform for its digital media services group.

In 2003, Pincus and Reid Hoffman purchased the Six Degrees patent, a broad, sweeping patent that describes a social network service that is the heart of social networks from the extinct Sixdegrees.com company for $700,000. Pincus and Hoffman stated at the time that their objective in buying the patent was to protect innovation in social networking and to prevent large companies from interfering with this.

==== Investing ====
Pincus was a founding investor in Napster, Facebook, Friendster, Snapchat, Xiaomi and Twitter. He was also an early investor in JD.com, Brightmail (later acquired by Symantec for $400m), and Buddy Media (acquired by Salesforce for $800m). In 2015, Pincus invested in the nootropics company HVMN (formerly Nootrobox), man-made diamond company Diamond Foundry, and in 2014 automated investment service firm Wealthfront.

==== Zynga ====
In July 2007 Pincus founded his fourth company, Zynga Inc., named after his deceased American bulldog Zinga. Zynga developed games on top of social networks such as Facebook, Myspace, and Bebo.

In 2011, Pincus took the company public with a $1 billion IPO. Pincus was CEO of the company from 2007 to 2013. On July 1, 2013, Zynga recruited Don Mattrick, the former president of Interactive Entertainment Business at Microsoft, to succeed Pincus as CEO. Pincus remained actively involved in the company as chairman of the board and Chief Product Officer, but stepped down from his role as chief product officer to focus on his role as chairman of the board, the company announced in April 2014.

Pincus returned to the role of CEO of Zynga in April 2015. On March 7, 2016, Pincus stepped down as CEO, but continued his association with Zynga as Executive Chairman of the Board with Frank Gibeau in the role of CEO. In 2018, citing his confidence in Zynga's management, Pincus voluntarily reduced his voting rights in the company from 70% to 10% and stepped back to a non-executive chairman role.

=== Start-ups ===
In 2014 Pincus started Superlabs, an incubator to develop products. Zynga acquired Superlabs in 2015.

In 2017, Pincus, alongside Reid Hoffman and Adam Werbach, launched Win the Future, a movement within the Democratic Party.

=== Reinvent Capital and SPACs ===
In 2018, with Reid Hoffman and Michael Thompson, Pincus co-founded Reinvent Capital, an investment firm that invests in internet, software, and media companies. Reinvent Capital has made investments in Zipline, goPuff, Dataminr, Nimble Robotics, Oscar Health, Lyft, all.Health, Convoy, SpaceX, and Aurora Innovation.

In September 2020, Reinvent launched Reinvent Technology Partners (RTP), a special purpose acquisition company (SPAC) which raised $690 million in its IPO. In February 2021, RTP announced a merger with electronic vertical take-off and landing aircraft pioneer Joby Aviation, valuing the company at $5 billion. Other investors included Uber Technologies, The Baupost Group, BlackRock, Fidelity Management & Research, and Baillie Gifford.

In November 2020, the group launched its second SPAC, Reinvent Technology Partners Z, which raised $230 million in its IPO. In March 2021, RTPZ announced a merger with insurance technology company Hippo Insurance. Hippo provides home insurance in the United States, and uses artificial intelligence and big data to aggregate and analyze property information.

In February 2021, Pincus and Reinvent partners announced its third SPAC, Reinvent Technology Partners Y, raising $977.5 million in its IPO. In July 2021, RTPY announced a plan to merge with Pittsburgh-based Aurora Innovation, which is developing Level 4 self-driving technology for trucks and passenger vehicles.

== Philanthropy and community service ==
=== Presidio Trust ===
Pincus is a former member of the board of the Presidio Trust, a federal agency that operates and maintains the Presidio as part of the Golden Gate Recreation Area. He was appointed to the board by President Obama in 2017.

=== Zynga.org ===
In October 2009, Pincus started Zynga.org.. Web 2 Summit. Retrieved on 2011-11-13. Zynga.org has since raised more than $20 million for more than 50 international nonprofits by occasionally selling virtual goods for charitable causes. During his time at Zynga Pincus created features for several gaming sites that allowed players to donate to the San Francisco Society for the Prevention of Cruelty to Animals (SPCA); two organizations in Haiti, FATEM and Fonkoze, raising $427,000 in less than three weeks in October 2009. In January 2010 Zynga.org had raised $1.5 million in five days for Haiti Earthquake relief. The money was distributed within just two days. The total Zynga.org raised during 2010 for earthquake relief in Haiti was $3 million. In 2011 they raised an additional $2 million for rescue efforts in Japan after the earthquake and tsunami that devastated the country.

On March 11, 2011, Zynga announced that 100 percent of the proceeds from the purchase of virtual goods from more than seven of its games would go toward Japan's Save the Children Earthquake Emergency Fund. During the 2012 holiday season, Zynga.org partnered with Toys for Tots in its largest charitable campaign not related to disaster relief. The campaign raised $745,000, with 100 percent of the purchase price of certain virtual goods going to Toys for Tots.

In 2014, Zynga raised $1 million for Water.org, a Kansas City, Missouri-based charity that funds clean water projects in developing countries.

=== Zynga match ===
Zynga announced in June 2020 that they created a $25 million fund to invest in charitable causes and educational organizations that promote diversity and inclusion.

=== Oakland Undivided Campaign ===
In May 2020, Pincus donated $700,000 to the Oakland Unified School District and City of Oakland to help meet their $12.5 million goal towards eliminating the prevalent digital gap that exists in Oakland.

=== Roden Crater Project ===
In February 2020, Pincus donated $3 million to Roden Crater, a large scale Land artwork by James Turrell within a dormant volcano in the Painted Desert region of Northern Arizona. The contributions bring the project closer to completion which the artist hopes to open within the next five years.

=== Bolinas COVID-19 testing ===
In April 2020, Pincus, Finnish entrepreneur Jyri Engeström and biotech executive Cyrus Harmon, organized and financed community-wide COVID-19 testing in their hometown of Bolinas, California. It was one of the first cases of community-wide testing in the US. Through their efforts Bolinas was able to test every one of its 1,600 residents for COVID-19 for free. Pincus donated the first $100,000 for the initiative, since it was not covered by government funds.

=== Canal Alliance ===
Pincus donated over $100,000 to Canal Alliance in June 2020. Canal Alliance is a nonprofit champion of immigrants who are challenged by a lack of resources and an unfamiliar environment.

== Political views ==
Pincus describes his views as libertarian. He co-hosted a fundraiser for Kamala Harris's 2016 Senate campaign and in 2020, along with many other Silicon Valley tech billionaires, gave the legal maximum dollar amount to support Joe Biden's presidential campaign. In July 2024, Pincus wrote that "Biden looks even riskier than Trump," disagreed with calls for Harris to replace Biden on the Democratic ticket, and praised aspects of Donald Trump's presidency.

== Personal life ==
In 2008, Pincus married Alison Gelb, who founded One Kings Lane, a furniture and home accessories sales website that was sold to Bed Bath & Beyond in 2016. They have three children, twin girls and a boy, and live in the Pacific Heights neighborhood of San Francisco. In March 2017, the couple divorced.

Pincus spends his time away from work with his daughters, cycling, surfing, playing soccer and doing yoga.

He joined The Giving Pledge in 2022, committing to donating most of his wealth.
