= Words with Friends =

Multiplayer crossword style video game

- Developer: Zynga
- Platforms: Android, iOS, Facebook, Kindle Fire, Nook Tablet, Windows Phone, Windows
- Release: July 2009
- Genre: Word game
- Modes: Single-player; multiplayer

Words with Friends is a multiplayer computer word game developed by Newtoy. Players take turns building words crossword-puzzle style in a manner similar to the classic board game Scrabble. The rules of the two games are similar, but Words with Friends is not associated with the Scrabble brand. Up to 40 games can be played simultaneously using push notifications to alert players when it is their turn. Players may look up friends either by username or via Facebook; they're able to be randomly assigned an opponent through "Smart Match" as well. Players can find potential opponents using Community Match.

Released in July 2009, Words with Friends is available for cross-platform play on devices running the operating systems Android, Windows Phone, and iOS (iPad, iPhone, iPod Touch). The game is also available on Facebook, Kindle Fire, and Nook Tablet. In addition, there is a chat feature built into the game that allows opponents to exchange messages. Between 2010 and 2011, Words with Friends was one of the top ranking games in the iOS app store, available as both a free ad-supported version and a paid version with no "third party ads between turns". As of May 2017, Words with Friends was the most popular mobile game in the United States. A sequel to the game, Words with Friends 2, came out in September 2017.

== Gameplay ==
An iPhone Words with Friends game in progress. The opponent has just played FIE, in the process also forming the word QI, for a score of 17 points.

The rules of the game are mostly the same as those of two-player Scrabble, with a few differences such as the arrangement of premium squares and the distribution and point values of some of the letters (see Scrabble letter distributions and point values). Players are given seven randomly chosen letter tiles, which are replenished until all 104 tiles have been used. Players take turns forming words on the board or, instead of playing a word, may also choose to swap tiles with the pool of currently unused tiles or pass their turn. Players can form words either vertically or horizontally on the board. The player's aim is to score as many points as possible.

A letter placed on a DL or TL square doubles or triples the value of that letter on all words formed using that square. Similarly, the DW and TW squares double and triple the value of the new word(s) using that square. If a player uses all seven tiles on a single play (known as a bingo in Scrabble), 35 bonus points are added - this contrasts with the 50 bonus points in Scrabble. The different arrangement of premium squares can lead to scoring situations that would be rare or impossible in a typical Scrabble game. For example, it is possible to place a new word that simultaneously covers a triple letter score (TL) and a triple word score (TW), or a new word that covers a double word score (DW) and a triple word score (TW), which would be impossible or nearly impossible in a Scrabble game.

The game ends when a player plays every tile in his or her rack, and there are no remaining tiles to draw. The game also ends if three scoreless moves (i.e., passes or tile exchanges) are played in succession, unless the score is zero-zero. After playing the last tile, the opposing player will lose all the points equal to the amount of the remaining tiles. This number of points will be awarded to the player who played the last tile. At the end of the game, the player with the highest score wins.

There are various versions of Words With Friends. All versions allow players to resign their turn with the "resign" feature, pass their turn with the "pass" feature, swap out one or more tiles and forfeit the current turn with the "swap" feature, or look up what tiles remain with the "tile bag" feature. The "word strength" feature can be turned on or off, and enables players to see how strong their placed word is relative to all other word combinations available on the current board. In 2016, Zynga (temporarily) removed a feature called "hindsight" which allowed a player to pay for the opportunity to see what the highest-scoring moves on the board were after the play was made, but has since brought it back. In addition to the "hindsight" power-up, the game also offers other power-ups known as "swap+," "word radar," and "word clue."

Words with Friends accepts 173,000 words in the game. The word list used by the game is based on the Enhanced North American Benchmark Lexicon (ENABLE), with some additions from the developers.

== Random opponent and chat features ==
Since the game's launch, the random opponent and chat features of the game have led to a number of romantic relationships. In 2009, Megan Lawless, of Chicago, began a game with a random opponent, Jasper Jasperse, who lived in the Netherlands. The two got to know one another via the game's chat function and married in July 2011. Other couples who met via the game's random opponent feature include Trish and David Palmer of Dacula, Georgia, who married in November 2011, and Stephen Monahan and Britney Hilbun of Texas, who became engaged to marry in December 2011.

In late 2011, it was reported that one of the game's American players was communicating via the game's chat function about her Australian opponent's husband's medical symptoms. The American relayed these symptoms to her husband, a doctor, who recommended an immediate hospital visit. The opponent's husband found he had a 99% blockage close to his heart. On a 2012 episode of the American TV show, The Doctors, the couples were introduced to each other for the first time.

== The board game ==
In 2012, Zynga, in conjunction with Hasbro, released several physical board game versions of Words with Friends under the "Hasbro Gaming" imprint. They include a standard version, a "Luxe" edition with rotating fitted tile gameboard (similar to the deluxe editions of Scrabble), and a "To Go" travel edition. That is one of several games in the Zynga game library to be released as physical board game versions. Others include Draw Something, a CityVille edition of Monopoly, and several kids' games based on FarmVille.

== Privacy issues ==
In October 2019, it was announced that the hack of social game developer Zynga had compromised the details of 218 million Words with Friends accounts. Information accessed includes players' names, email addresses, login IDs, hashed passwords, password reset tokens, phone numbers, Facebook IDs, and Zynga account IDs.
