= Zynga =

American video game company

Zynga Inc.

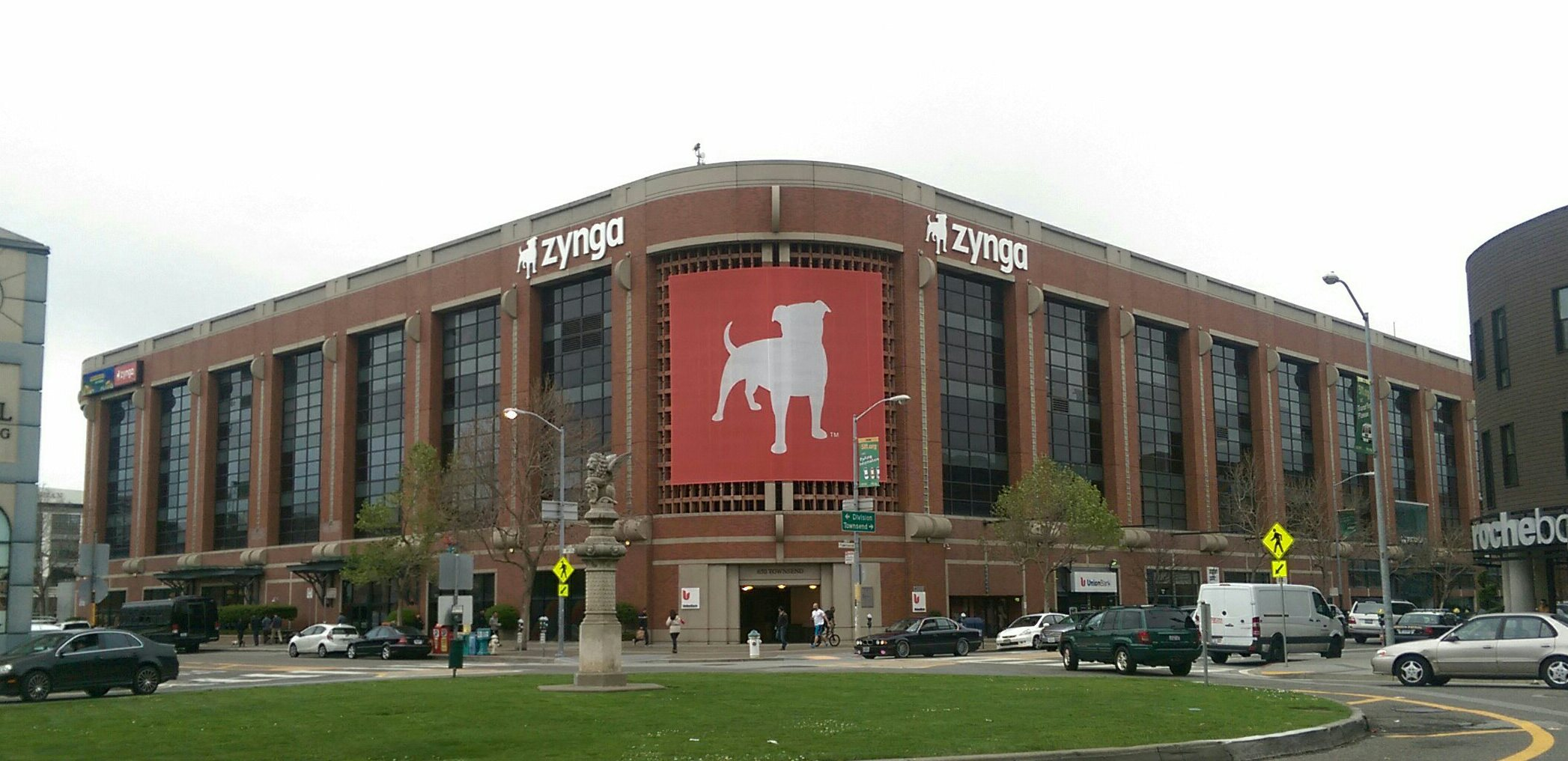
- Formerly: Presidio Media (April–July 2007)
- Type: Subsidiary
- Traded as: Nasdaq: ZNGA (2011–2022)
- Industry: Video games
- Founded: April 2007; 19 years ago
- Founders: Mark Pincus; Justin Waldron; Eric Schiermeyer; Michael Luxton; Steve Schoettler
- Headquarters: San Mateo, California, United States
- Key people: Frank Gibeau (president)
- Number of employees: 2,952 (2021)
- Parent: Take-Two Interactive (2022–present)
- Subsidiaries: Peak Games; Small Giant Games Oy; Gram Games; NaturalMotion; StarLark Games; Rollic; Socialpoint; Nordeus
- Website: www.zynga.com

Zynga Inc. (/ˈzɪŋɡə/) is an American video game developer and publisher known for its social video game services. It was founded in April 2007, and it is owned by Take-Two Interactive since 2022, with headquarters in San Mateo, California. The company primarily focuses on mobile and social networking platforms. Zynga states its mission as "connecting the world through games".

Zynga launched FarmVille on Facebook in June 2009, reaching ten million daily active users (DAU) within six weeks. As of August 2017, Zynga had thirty million monthly active users (MAU). In 2017, its most successful games were Zynga Poker and Words with Friends 2, with about 57 million games being played at any given moment; and CSR Racing 2, the most popular racing game on mobile devices. Zynga began trading on NASDAQ on December 16, 2011, under the ticker ZNGA.

Take-Two Interactive announced in January 2022 its intent to buy Zynga for $12.7 billion. The deal was completed in May 2022.

According to Take-Two Interactive, about 10% of the world's population plays Zynga's games every month.

== History ==
Zynga was founded in April 2007 by Mark Pincus, with founding team members Eric Schiermeyer, Justin Waldron, Michael Luxton, Steve Schoettler, and Andrew Trader, under the name Presidio Media. The company name changed to Zynga in July 2007. Zynga was named after Pincus' American bulldog Zinga and uses an image of a bulldog as its logo. Zynga's first game, Texas Hold 'Em Poker, now known as Zynga Poker, was released on Facebook in July 2007. It was the first game Facebook introduced on its social networking platform.

Zynga became the Facebook app developer with the most monthly active users in April 2009, with 40 million people playing its games that month. Soon after, the company opened its first external game studio in Baltimore, Zynga East, led by Brian Reynolds.

In June 2009, Zynga acquired MyMiniLife which built and launched FarmVille on Facebook. By August, Farmville was the first game on Facebook to reach 10 million daily active users. On November 23, 2009, FarmVille.com went live as Zynga's first stand-alone game. In February 2010, Farmville had over 80 million players, and on May 18, 2010, Facebook and Zynga entered into a five-year relationship to expand the use of Facebook Credits in Zynga's games.

In December 2010, Zynga's game CityVille surpassed FarmVille as its most popular game with over 61 million monthly active users and a base of over 16 million daily active users.

Zynga filed with the U.S. Securities and Exchange Commission (SEC) to raise up to $1 billion in an initial public offering on July 1, 2011. At the time, the company had 2,000 employees. On November 28, 2011, the Finnish game developer Rovio Entertainment rejected an acquisition attempt from Zynga worth $2.25 billion. Zynga began trading on NASDAQ on December 16, 2011.

Zynga acquired four game development companies, Game Doctors, developer of Zombie Smash, Page44 Studios, HipLogic and Astro Ape Studios. On June 26, 2012, during the Zynga Unleashed conference, Zynga announced the "Zynga With Friends" network, aiming to connect players of Zynga game titles across multiple platforms. Zynga also announced the Zynga API, intended to help developers build social games. The company announced that three new partners were developing games for Zynga.com including 50 Cubes, Majesco and Portalarium. The company unveiled the Zynga Partners for Mobile program to help increase Zynga's presence on mobile devices.

In October 2012, Zynga announced a partnership with bwin.party, an international real-money gaming operator, to launch real-money gaming in the UK, including the release of online poker, a suite of 180 casino games, and the first online FarmVille-branded real money slots game during 2013.

On June 3, 2013, Zynga announced layoffs of 520 employees—roughly 18% of its workforce—and closed offices in New York, Los Angeles, and Dallas. By July 2013, Zynga had reportedly lost nearly half of its user base from the previous year. Consequently, investors decreased Zynga's valuation by $400 million. On July 25, 2013, Zynga said it would not be pursuing real money game production in the US. Following this announcement, shares dropped 13%.

In July 2013, Zynga hired Microsoft's Interactive Entertainment President Don Mattrick as its new CEO. Pincus remained as Zynga's chairman and chief product officer.

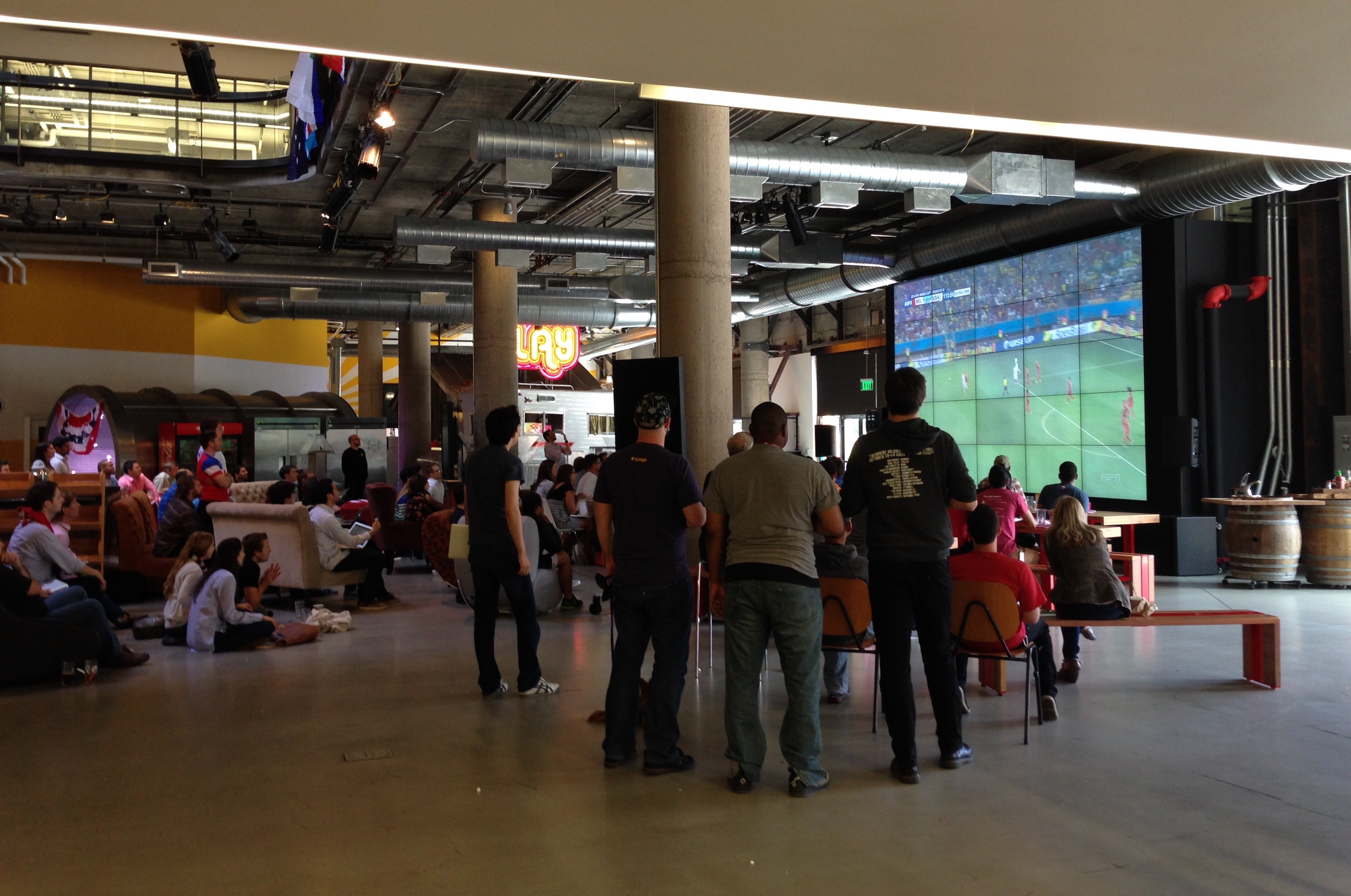
Employees watch the 2014 FIFA World Cup during a scheduled break.

In January 2014, the company announced the layoff of 314 workers, about 15% of its total workforce. In April 2014, founder & former CEO Pincus stepped down from his role as chief product officer. He remained as chairman of the board.

First quarter results for 2014 showed that daily active user numbers fell from 53 million to 28 million year-over-year. In April 2014, the company announced its new hire of Alex Garden, co-founder of Relic Entertainment and former Microsoft Game Studios executive.

In July 2014, Zynga signed a lease for office space in Maitland, Florida. Less than one year later, this Orlando-area office was closed.

Don Mattrick left Zynga in April 2015, replaced by predecessor Mark Pincus. Frank Gibeau took over as CEO on March 7, 2016, with Pincus once again stepping aside. Gibeau's last position was as head of mobile for Electronic Arts. He joined Zynga's board of directors in August 2015.

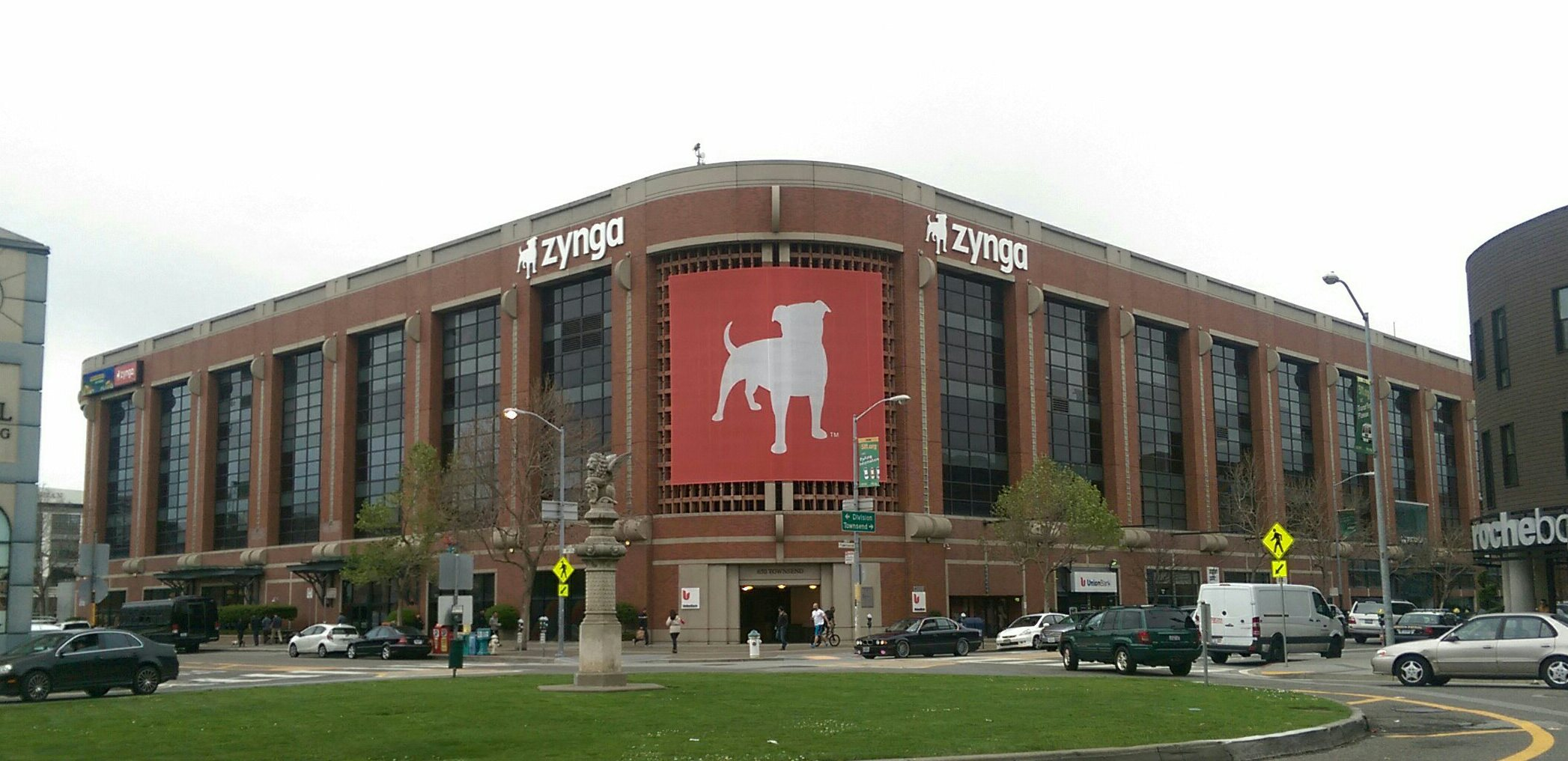
Zynga headquarters in San Francisco in 2016

In the fourth quarter of 2017, revenue was $233.3 million, a 22% increase from the same quarter in 2016, the best quarterly performance in five years. As of January 2018, Zynga had 1,681 employees, approximately 80 million monthly active users, and a market capitalization of $3.39 billion. According to the company, Zynga has had over one billion people play its games since its inception in 2007.

On January 10, 2022, Take-Two Interactive announced its intention to acquire the company in a cash-and-stock deal with a value of $12.7 billion, with Take-Two acquiring all outstanding shares of Zynga at $9.86 apiece Both shareholders of the companies approved the merger on May 19, 2022, and the closing of the transaction took effect on May 23, 2022.

In June 2023, during the FTC v. Microsoft trial cross-examination, Microsoft Gaming CEO Phil Spencer disclosed that Microsoft considered purchasing Zynga before Take-Two Interactive acquired the studio in 2022.

== Funding ==
In its first round of funding in January 2008, Zynga received US$10 million. In July of the same year, Zynga received US$29 million in venture finance from several firms. During its first four years of operation Zynga raised a total of $854 million in three rounds of fund raising. The last round, in February 2011, raised $490 million.

=== Public offering ===
On July 1, 2011, the company filed its Form S-1 registration statement with the U.S. Securities and Exchange Commission (SEC). Zynga was priced at $10 per share and began trading on NASDAQ under ZNGA on December 16, 2011. The stock closed down 5% on its first day, then climbed 26% to $13.39 per share after Facebook's IPO filing on February 1, 2012 (Facebook had reported that 12% of its revenue comes from Zynga). In March 2012 ZNGA was trading at $14.50. For several years the stock performed poorly, but in 2017 the price hit a three-year high. By the end of 2017 Zynga's shares were trading at $4.00, a 56% gain for the year.

== Acquisitions ==
Date	Games	Company	Market	New name	Price	Country	Footnotes
July 2008	Yoville	cb				USA	
Feb 2010		Serious Business				USA	
Feb 2010						Los Angeles, CA USA	
Feb 2010						Bangalore, India	
May 2010		XPD Media				Beijing, China	
Aug 2010		Unoh Games		Zynga Japan		Tokyo, Japan	
June 2010		Challenge Games		Zynga Austin		Austin, Texas USA	
June 2010	FrontierVille			Zynga East		Timonium, MD USA	
Aug 2010		Conduit Labs		Zynga Boston		Cambridge, MA USA	
Sept 2010	Aves Engine (Game engine technology)	Dextrose AG		Zynga Germany		Frankfurt, Germany	
Oct 2010		Bonfire Studios		Zynga Dallas		Dallas, Texas USA	
Dec 2010	Words with Friends; Chess with Friends	Newtoy, Inc.		Zynga with Friends		McKinney, Texas USA	
Jan 2011	CSI: Crime City Parking Wars Drop7	Area/Code		Zynga New York		New York, USA	
March 2011	MoPets; Madden 2005 and 2006; NASCAR 07; Pirates of the Caribbean; Flowerz	Floodgate Entertainment				Boston, USA	
April 2011		MarketZero				Austin, Texas USA	
Jun 2011	Social browser	Flock					
March 2012	Draw Something	OMGPop			$180 million		
June 2012	Tomb Raider; Tony Hawk	Buzz Monkey		Zynga Eugene		Oregon, USA	
Sept 2012	Lucky Train	A Bit Lucky			$20 million+		
Nov 2012	Battlestone	November Software					
June 2013	Wizard of Oz; Hit it Rich Slots	Spooky Cool Labs					
Jan 2014	CSR Racing; Clumsy Ninja	NaturalMotion			$527 million	Oxford, United Kingdom	
June 2015	Product Incubator	SuperLabs			$1.00		
June 2016	Dragon Academy	Team Chaos				Austin, Texas USA	
March 2017	Solitaire; FreeCell; Pyramid; Spider Solitaire	Harpan, LLC			$42.5 million		
Nov 2017	Casual card games	Peak Games			$100 million	Turkey	
May 2018	"Merge" games	Gram Games			$250 million	United Kingdom Turkey	
Dec 2018	Empires & Puzzles	Small Giant Games			$560 million	Finland	
June 2020	Toy Blast	Peak			$1.8 billion	Turkey	
October 2020	Go Knots 3D; Tangle Master 3D	Rollic			$180 million	Turkey	
March 2021		Echtra Games			$21.1 million	San Francisco, CA USA	
May 2021		Chartboost			$250 million	San Francisco, CA USA	
August 2021	Golf Rival	StarLark			$525 million	China	
February 2022		NanoTribe				Germany	
September 2022		Storemaven				Israel	
November 2022		Popcore				Germany	

=== Floodgate Entertainment ===
Floodgate Entertainment was an American video game developer founded by Paul Neurath (Creative Director) in 2000. Many of the company's employees are former Looking Glass Studios employees. Floodgate co-developed Neverwinter Nights: Shadows of Undrentide alongside BioWare and Dark Messiah of Might and Magic alongside Arkane Studios. In 2006, they signed a deal with Sony BMG Music Entertainment to distribute their game Mo-Pets. On March 24, 2011, Floodgate was acquired by Zynga and merged with Zynga Boston.

== Business model ==
Zynga uses a "free-to-play" business model. Revenue is acquired via direct credit card payments and partner businesses. It sells in-game virtual goods as people play its games, supports in-game advertising, and it has banner advertising around its game portals.

In addition, Zynga games are linked to offers from several partners. Players can choose to accept credit card offers, take surveys or buy services from Zynga's partners in order to obtain game credits. Players may also purchase game credits directly from Zynga. In the game, players can purchase the points for a fee. In March 2010 Zynga started selling pre-paid cards in the US for virtual currency.

In March 2012, Zynga launched a separate social gaming platform, which included publishing other developers to the Zynga.com platform. Early third-party developers included Row Sham Bow, Inc and Mobscience. In June 2012, Zynga started running Facebook advertisements and sponsored stories on its website. The revenue was split between Facebook and Zynga.

=== Hasbro partnership ===
In February 2012, it was announced that Zynga and Hasbro had partnered to create products based on Zynga properties and brands. In October 2012, Zynga and Hasbro launched eight 'face-to-face' games resulting from their collaboration: FarmVille Hungry Hungry Herd and Animal Games; CityVille Monopoly and Skies; Words With Friends Classic, Luxe, To Go; and Draw Something. The Hasbro games included ties to Zynga Web and mobile games, such as in-game currency that players can use in the digital versions of CityVille and FarmVille.

=== Customer acquisition ===
The company initially relied on free distribution of its product to users, and later began spending money on marketing. In 2017, developing a paid user base took priority over a new user acquisition. According to one analyst, Zynga can either fund the creation of new games to attract new users, or it can buy smaller game studios with new games which will bring in new customers.

=== Platinum Purchase Program ===
In September 2010, Gawker reported that Zynga had set up a "Platinum Purchase Program," a private club for its top spenders, allowing members to purchase virtual currency at favorable rates. Despite some bad publicity, the program was considered a sound core business principle. The program shut down on October 31, 2014.

=== Viability ===
Some journalists questioned the viability of Zynga's business model. Ray Valdes questioned the long-term prospects for Zynga, saying that it would be difficult for the company to make new titles to replace old ones whose novelty is fading. Tom Bollich, a former Zynga investor, said that it is impossible to make a cheap viral game, and that retaining customers is difficult.

In an October 2011 article in The Wall Street Journal, Ben Levisohn said that Zynga has "issues that could limit its upside," such as its dependence on Facebook and its reliance on a small percentage of users and a small number of games for most of its revenue.

In July 2012, after announcing disappointing second quarter results, some analysts speculated that the sale of virtual items may not be a long-term, viable business model. Analyst Richard Greenfield downgraded Zynga from "buy" to "neutral." In 2012 Zynga took steps to turn its business around, which included introducing new Web, mobile, and multiplayer games and developing a gambling game to be introduced outside the U.S. The company worked to increase advertising revenues, which were up to 45 percent in Q2 2012 compared to the previous quarter and increased to 170 percent year-over-year.

=== In-game sign-up ===
Through 2009, Zynga let players earn in-game rewards for signing up for credit cards or for a video-rental membership. In November 2009, the company removed all "lead-generating" ads, relying instead on revenue generated by the 1-3 percent of players that pay for in-game items. Since then, it began re-introducing the ads back in but with controls to monitor the kinds of ads that appear.

In early November 2009, it was estimated that about one-third of Zynga's revenue came from companies that provide legitimate commercial offers, such as trading Netflix memberships and marketing surveys for in-game cash. Because of criticism and complaints that some ads were scams, on November 2, 2009, former CEO Mark Pincus said that Tatto Media, a major offer provider that enrolled users into recurring cell phone subscriptions, and the worst of the lead generator scam, had already been removed from Zynga and was banned, in addition to requiring providers to filter and police offers before posting to their networks.

== Corporate culture ==
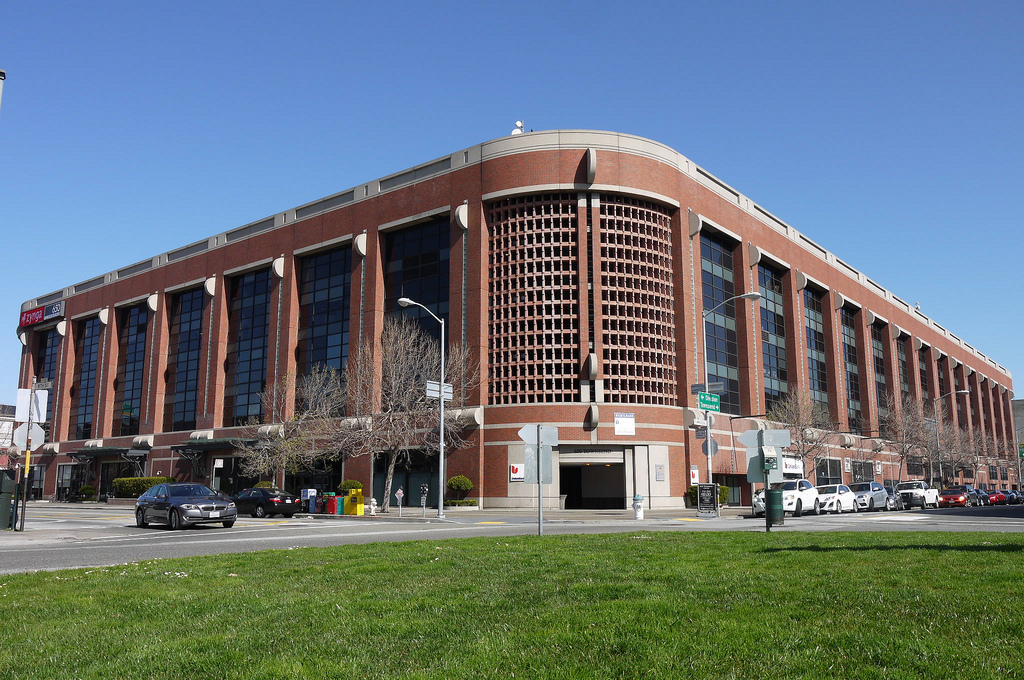
Zynga HQ

In 2011, Zynga started to move employees to new headquarters, located in San Francisco's South of Market district. Zynga's headquarters, nicknamed "The Dog House", features a coffee shop, gaming arcade, gym, basketball court, and wellness center. At its San Francisco headquarters, Zynga Founder Pincus's goal was to create a "playful gaming environment" that evokes a "fantasy land." Zynga employees, also referred to as "Zyngites", enjoy perks such as free gourmet meals, access to an in-house nutritionist, and personal training.

In November 2011, The New York Times reported that Zynga "operates like a federation of city-states" with each of its games, such as FarmVille and CityVille, run by autonomous teams. This culture reportedly fostered "fierce internal competition" and caused some employees to complain about long hours and stressful deadlines. Two former senior Zynga employees, quoted anonymously by the Times, speculated that Zynga's corporate culture caused the company to lose a bid to acquire mobile game company PopCap and nearly derailed its acquisition of MyMiniLife, which later developed the technology that is the basis for FarmVille.

In 2017, Zynga donated a large sum to the University of Southern California to support the study of social mobile games, inclusive game production, and advancing diversity in the industry.

== Zynga.org ==
In 2009, Zynga started a nonprofit organization, Zynga.org, in charge of incorporating charitable contributions into its games such as FarmVille. As of 2015, Zynga.org efforts have raised $20 million for international humanitarian relief efforts and philanthropic initiatives.

== Relationship with Facebook ==
On July 18, 2011, Zynga filed an addendum to its Form S-1 detailing its relationship with Facebook, including the 2010 five-year agreement to use Facebook credits exclusively.

On October 11, 2011, Zynga announced plans to create its own platform on which users can play the company's games. It was Zynga's first major step away from the social media giant.

At one point during 2011, Zynga made up 19 percent of Facebook's revenue, partly because of the special mutually beneficial relationship between the two companies.

In November 2012, Facebook ended its special agreement with Zynga. Effective March 31, 2013, Zynga was bound by the standard Facebook Platform policies.

In May 2017, Zynga launched Words with Friends on Facebook's newly launched platform Instant Games, on Facebook's Messenger instant messaging app.

== Owned studios ==
=== Headquarters ===
In the fall of 2010, Zynga signed a rental agreement for 270,000 square feet (25,000 m^{2}) of office space at the site of former Sega offices. In 2012, the company purchased the entire building, with about 407,000 square feet of total space, for $228 million. The building was reported to be worth about $500 million in 2016.

In 2022, Zynga relocated its headquarters to San Mateo, California.

=== Active studios ===
Name	Description	Date Acquired/established	Footnote
NaturalMotion (offices in Brighton and London)	Zynga acquired NaturalMotion for a company record of $527 million. NaturalMotion had purchased Boss Alien in the summer of 2012.	2014	
Zynga Chicago	Zynga acquired Spooky Cool Labs	June 2013	
Zynga ATX	Formerly MarketZero	April 2011	
Zynga Austin	Formerly Challenge Games	June 2010	
Zynga Eugene	Formerly Buzz Monkey Software	June 2012	
Zynga India	Bangalore, India	February 2010	
Zynga Ireland		2011	
Zynga Toronto	Formerly Five Mobile	July 2011	
Zynga Turkey	Zynga acquired Peak Games' casual card portfolio in 2017	November 2017	
Zynga San Diego			

=== Former studios ===
Name	Description	Date Acquired/Established	Date Closed	Footnotes
OMGPop	Draw Something creators	March 2012	June 2013	
Floodgage Entertainment		March 2011	October 2012	
Wild Needle	A casual games company that makes games which appeal to women/girls	May 2012		
Zynga with Friends	Formerly Newtoy, Inc., based in McKinney, Texas	November 2010	June 2013	
Zynga Boston	Formerly Conduit Labs	August 2010	October 2012	
Zynga China	Formerly XPD Media, based in Beijing	May 2010	February 2015	
Zynga Dallas	Formerly Bonfire Studios	October 2010	June 2013	
Zynga Germany	Formerly Dextrose AG, based in Frankfurt	September 2010	2014	
Zynga East	Based in Baltimore, Maryland	May 2009	February 2013	
Zynga Japan	Formerly Unoh Games, based in Tokyo	August 2010	January 2013	
Zynga Los Angeles		February 2010	June 2013	
Zynga New York	Formerly Area/Code	January 2011	June 2013	
Page 44 Studios		September 2011		
Zynga Seattle		October 2010	January 2014	
Rising Tide Games		September 2015		
Zindagi Games		February 2016		
NaturalMotion (Oxford)		January 2014	October 2017	

== Reception and controversies ==
=== Spam concerns ===
Many of Zynga's games involve players posting messages to non-players, often for in-game benefits. Many non-players have notably complained about such communications created by those games that appear to them as "spammy." Peter Jamison described Zynga's communications as a "deluge" of "unwanted gifts or requests for neighborly 'help'". Facebook groups created to express displeasure regarding overexposure of Zynga's games attracted millions of members. As a result of this, Facebook modified their application developers policy to prevent applications from sending messages to news feeds of friends or submitting updates to the notifications bar. Kotaku attributed a decline in users of Zynga games in April and May 2010 to the removal of Facebook notifications.

=== Intellectual property infringement ===
Zynga has been accused several times of copying game concepts of popular games by competing developers. The launch of Mafia Wars sparked a lawsuit from the makers of Mob Wars. An attorney for Psycho Monkey, the creators of Mob Wars, said that in making Mafia Wars, Zynga "copied virtually every important aspect of the game." The suit was settled out of court for $7–9 million. An Ars Technica column said that Zynga's Café World and Playfish's Restaurant City were "nearly identical"; Café World was released six months after Restaurant City. Its gameplay, design, graphics, avatars, and even in-game items are almost identical to the ones in Restaurant City. In addition, journalists have remarked that Zynga's FarmVille is similar to Farm Town, another Zynga game, with Peter Jamison calling it "uncannily similar."

In September 2010, SF Weekly reported that an employee recalled Mark Pincus advising him to "copy what [Zynga's competitors] do and do it until you get their numbers." NimbleBit founder Ian Marsh has accused Zynga of copying its award-winning Tiny Tower game to create Dream Heights. Within a week, Buffalo Studios alleged that its game Bingo Blitz was copied by Zynga in making Zynga Bingo. Pincus responded by saying that tower-building games have existed since SimTower (1994) and that Zynga uses mechanics and ideas developed throughout the history of video games to create the "best-in-market games." He added that Bingo Blitz has similarities to the discontinued Zynga game Poker Blitz. In response, Marsh argued that other tower games like SimTower and Tower Bloxx are substantially different from Tiny Tower and Dream Heights, and that Zynga copied Tiny Tower's "core gameplay mechanics and rules" and tutorial steps. Inside Social Games writer Pete Davison said that although Zynga's The Ville is "not a complete clone" of The Sims Social, it was "very similar."

Zynga founder Mark Pincus has dismissed the criticisms, saying that competing video game makers have always released similar titles for each genre of game. The managing director of Lightspeed Venture Partners, Jeremy Liew, said that creating similar competing games has "always been part of the game industry." Following Zynga's January 2012 release of Hidden Chronicles, Paul Tassi of Forbes wrote that Zynga "refuses to innovate in any way, and is merely a follower when it comes to ideas and game design." In September 2009 Zynga was threatened with legal action by Nissan for using its trademarks in the game Street Racing. Zynga subsequently renamed and changed the thumbnail images of all cars that were branded Nissan and Infiniti to "Sindats" and "Fujis" with the thumbnails changed. At the time it also renamed and redesigned automobiles depicted as being made by GM, Ferrari, Lamborghini, Saab, and others. In September 2009, Zynga initiated trade secrets lawsuits against Playdom and 22 other rivals, including Green Patch which Playdom acquired in November 2009. These lawsuits were finally settled in November 2010. In October 2010, Zynga was criticized on Hacker News and other social media sites for having filed a patent application relating to the ability to purchase virtual currency for cash on gambling and other gaming sites. Commentators said that significant prior art exists for the concept.

In January 2011, Techdirt reported that Zynga sent a cease and desist letter to Blingville alleging trademark infringement for its use of the letters "ville" in the name of a proposed Facebook game. Blingville filed a suit for declaratory judgment that it did not infringe on a Zynga trademark. As reported in Gamasutra, Jay Monahan of Zynga responded by saying that Blingville's "[use] of the name 'BlingVille' is an obvious attempt to capitalize on the fame and goodwill associated with Zynga's family of 'ville' games which includes FarmVille and CityVille".

In November 2011, Inside Mobile Apps wrote that Zynga's lawyers demanded that mobile game developer Latman Interactive abandon its trademark registration for the game Quackville. Night Owl Games has also filed a lawsuit for declaratory judgment that its game Dungeonville does not infringe any Zynga trademarks after Zynga protested Night Owl's registration of the Dungeonville trademark. In May 2012, Zynga sued Kobojo for trademark infringement for calling one of its games PyramidVille. In October that year Zynga and Kobojo settled the suit with neither party making any payment as part of the settlement.

On May 20, 2011, it was reported that The Learning Company, owners of The Oregon Trail trademark, filed a trademark infringement suit against Zynga, which was planning an "Oregon Trail" expansion to FrontierVille. The Learning Company had previously contacted Zynga about an Oregon Trail game on Facebook, but Zynga declined. On May 24, Games.com writer Brandy Shaul wrote that Zynga was dropping the Oregon Trail name and soliciting new names for the expansion. The name of the expansion became "Pioneer Trail." In March 2015 Zynga announced it was closing six games, including Pioneer Trail.

In August 2012, Electronic Arts (EA) sued Zynga for copyright infringement, alleging that Zynga's The Ville copied expressive elements of EA's The Sims Social. Zynga's counsel responded by alleging that EA's SimCity Social "bears an uncanny resemblance to Zynga's CityVille". The litigants settled their suit in February 2013. The agreement stipulated that each side would bear its own legal costs and drop the allegations.

On October 14, 2012, Zynga filed a lawsuit against a former general manager Alan Patmore, for allegedly misappropriating trade secrets. The suit claimed Patmore misappropriated trade secrets and was in breach of contract. The suit was settled in September 2013.

=== Insider trading allegations ===
In July 2012, a class action lawsuit was filed against Zynga, alleging that Mark Pincus and some other insiders were allowed to sell shares before disappointing Q2 results were revealed. The lawsuit was settled in August 2015 for $23 million.

In March 2015, a district judge ruled that plaintiffs can pursue a lawsuit against Zynga on claims executives inflated the company's value prior to its 2011 initial public offering by concealing weaknesses in its R&D pipeline of new games, numbers of users and their purchasing patterns, and other key metrics.

=== Other legal issues ===
In late May 2010, the Norwegian Consumer Council filed a complaint to the Data Inspectorate regarding breaches of the Data Protection Act. In August 2011 the Data Inspectorate concluded that Facebook is not under Norwegian jurisdiction, since the company is established in Ireland and not in Norway. The complaint was therefore forwarded to the Irish commissioner of data protection.

In August 2010, the San Francisco city attorney's office complained about the firm's guerrilla marketing campaign for its Mafia Wars game that pasted fake money on city sidewalks, calling it "vandalism". Davis Elen Advertising took responsibility for the ad campaign and agreed to pay the city of San Francisco $45,000 in fines for illegal marketing tactics.

=== Data breach ===
In September 2019, a Pakistani hacker that goes by the name Gnosticplayers claimed to have hacked into Zynga's database of Words with Friends players and gained access to the 218 million accounts registered there. While Zynga affirmed the hack and that the information revealed included names, emails, Login IDs, hashed and salted passwords (SHA-1), password reset tokens, Zynga account IDs and connections to Facebook and other social media services, it did not state how many accounts were affected, but would contact those players with affected accounts. The data breach-tracking website Have I Been Pwned? affirmed in December 2019 that more than 173 million accounts were affected.

== Mobile games ==
Games	Facebook	Mobile Platform
Boggle With Friends	No	Yes
Cafe World	Yes	No
Chess With Friends	No	Yes
Clumsy Ninja	No	Yes
CSR Racing	No	Yes
CSR Racing 2	No	Yes
CSR Racing Classics	No	Yes
Crazy Cake Swap	No	Yes
Crazy Kitchen	No	Yes
Crosswords With Friends	No	Yes
Draw Something	No	Yes
Drop 7	No	Yes
Empires & Allies	No	Yes
FarmVille	Yes	No
FarmVille 2	Yes	No
FarmVille 2: Country Escape	No	Yes
FarmVille 2: Tropic Escape	Yes	Yes
FarmVille 3: Animals	No	Yes
FarmVille Harvest Swap	Yes	Yes
FarmVille Tropic Escape	No	Yes
Game of Thrones Legends	No	Yes
Game of Thrones Slots Casino	Yes	Yes
Gems With Friends	No	Yes
Hanging With Friends	No	Yes
Harry Potter: Puzzles & Spells	Yes	Yes
Hit It Rich! Casino Slots	Yes	Yes
Looney Tunes Dash	No	Yes
Mafia Wars/Mafia Wars Classic	Yes	Yes
Mafia Wars 2	Yes	Yes
Mafia Wars Shakedown	No	Yes
Matching With Friends	No	Yes
Merge Magic	No	Yes
PetVille	Yes	?
Princess Bride Slots	Yes	Yes
Solstice Arena	No |	Yes
Speed Guess Something	No	Yes
Spin It Rich	Yes	Yes
What's the Phrase	No	Yes
Willy Wonka Slots	Yes	Yes
Wizard of Oz Magic Match	Yes	Yes
Wizard of Oz Slots	Yes	Yes
Wonka's World of Candy	No	Yes
Word Streak With Friends (Formerly Scramble With Friends)	Yes	Yes
Words With Friends	Yes	Yes
Words With Friends 2	No	Yes
Words On Tour	No	Yes
Yummy Gummy	No	Yes
Zynga Poker	Yes	Yes
Zynga Poker Classic	No	Yes

== See also ==
- Browser game
- Opera GX
- List of browser games
- List of multiplayer browser games
