= Gridders =

1994 video game

- Developer: Tetragon
- Publisher: The 3DO Company
- Producer: Mark Skaggs
- Designer: Jim Von Ehr
- Artists: Don Williams; Joey Bryant; Matt Bigham
- Composer: Doug Benson
- Platform: 3DO
- Release: NA: August–September 1994; JP: November 18, 1994; EU: 1994
- Genre: Puzzle
- Mode: Single-player

Gridders is a 1994 puzzle video game developed by Tetragon and published by The 3DO Company for the 3DO. It was also included as a pack-in game for the 3DO Blaster, an add-on produced and designed by Creative Labs to allow Microsoft Windows to play 3DO games. The game follows Zack, a worker for the Gridder Corporation run by Lazarus R. Trench, and his dog companion Fidex entering the factory in order to reach a mysterious secret within its basement. The player acts as Zack and must explore 36 floors, navigating squares and collecting pyramid keys by solving puzzles, while avoiding Gridder blocks and obstacles.

Gridders was the creation of Tetragon, a Texas-based game developer founded in 1993 by Mark Skaggs, known for leading the team that created the Facebook game FarmVille at Zynga. It was produced by Skaggs and designed by Jim Von Ehr, with Joey Bryant serving as lead artist, while the music was scored by Doug Benson. The game was met with mixed reception from critics, some of which reviewed it as an import title. Tetragon would go on to port Hell: A Cyberpunk Thriller for the 3DO and develop NanoTek Warrior for the PlayStation.

== Gameplay ==
Gameplay screenshot.

Gridders is a three-dimensional puzzle game reminiscent of Klax. It takes place in the year 2049, where depletion of finite natural resources by humans led the Earth to an ecological disaster. The United World Council enlisted aid of the Gridders Corporation run by Lazarus R. Trench, who fiercely protects a proprietary technology from manufacturing automatons dubbed Gridders used in his factory and refuses to open their operations to any government or institution. As the Gridders grew more sophisticated and efficient, the company's working payroll was reduced from 1550 workers to one 20-year old called Zack. One day, Zack arrived to work and found a written note signed by a person named "Sandra", stating that a secret is hidden within the depths of the factory.

Acting as Zack, who is joined by his dog companion Fidex, the player must explore 36 floors to reach the mysterious secret within the basement of the Gridders Corporation. The player navigates squares in order to collect green pyramid keys required to complete each level by solving puzzles, while avoiding Gridder blocks that can instantly crush Zack. Each floor becomes increasingly difficult and complex as the player progresses further, introducing additional obstacles such as trap doors, elevator squares, and diversion squares that are also key to solve a level. Zack can collect items that are either beneficial or harmful to the player. The player can also change between two different camera perspectives during gameplay. Every sixth level is a bonus round where Zack must lit a pattern of squares and get "non-dud" Gridder blocks land on them in order to become blue diamonds, which are worth extra points.

== Development and release ==
Gridders was created by Tetragon, a Texas-based video game developer founded in 1993 by Mark Skaggs, an American game producer and executive known for leading the team that created the Facebook game FarmVille at Zynga. It was produced by Skaggs and designed by Jim Von Ehr. Joey Bryant served as the game's lead artist, creating all the animations for the main character and cutscenes as traditional cel animation. Alongside Bryant, Don Williams and Matt Bigham were also responsible for the artwork. The music was scored by Doug Benson. Gridders was first published for the 3DO in North America between August and September 1994, then in Japan on November 18, and later that year in Europe by The 3DO Company. It was also included as a pack-in game for the 3DO Blaster, an add-on produced and designed by Creative Labs that allow compatible Windows-based PCs to play 3DO titles. Tetragon would later work for GameTek in porting the PC game Hell: A Cyberpunk Thriller to the 3DO Interactive Multiplayer, as well as Virgin Interactive with NanoTek Warrior for the PlayStation, before the company was shut down four years later.

== Reception ==
Reception

Review scores
Publication	Score
Electronic Gaming Monthly	38/50
Génération 4	62%
M! Games	37%
3DO Magazine	3/5
Electronic Games	A
Entertainment Weekly	B−
VideoGames	7/10

Gridders was met with mixed reception from critics, some of which reviewed it as an import title. VideoGames's Jeffrey Adam Young commended its graphics for making use of the 3DO hardware with the three-dimensional space and smooth transition between viewpoints. Adam Young also found the sound to be decent, and its gameplay accessible but addictive and challenging, but stated that the plot was not essential for a puzzle game. Electronic Gaming Monthly's five reviewers regarded it as one of the better titles for the platform, highlighting its difficulty in later levels and cinematics, stating that "Fans of puzzle games like Tetris and Pac-Attack will definitely take to this game." GamePro's Earth Angel saw its "realistic" 3D visuals as the main draw and a first for puzzle games, while giving a positive remark to the audio. Angel commented that Zack was easy to control, and the gameplay easy to understand but complex and difficult in the more complicated levels.

An editor for Génération 4 felt that the game was very repetitive and annoying despite its original concept. 3DO Magazine's Stuart Wynne praised the graphical engine, CD music and sound effects, commending Tetragon for attempting to produce a new style of game. Regardless, Wynne wrote that "despite all its efforts ... this is another puzzler unlikely to break out of its ghetto making for that classic puzzler finishing line: it's okay and if you like this sort of thing, you'll probably like this." Entertainment Weekly's Bob Strauss commended the visuals and "unique" perspective, but found it less addictive and harder to understand compared to Tetris, writing that "Gridders is a perfect example of how the fledgling system has become overly impressed while forgetting altogether about impressing consumers."
