= Dennis Hopper filmography =

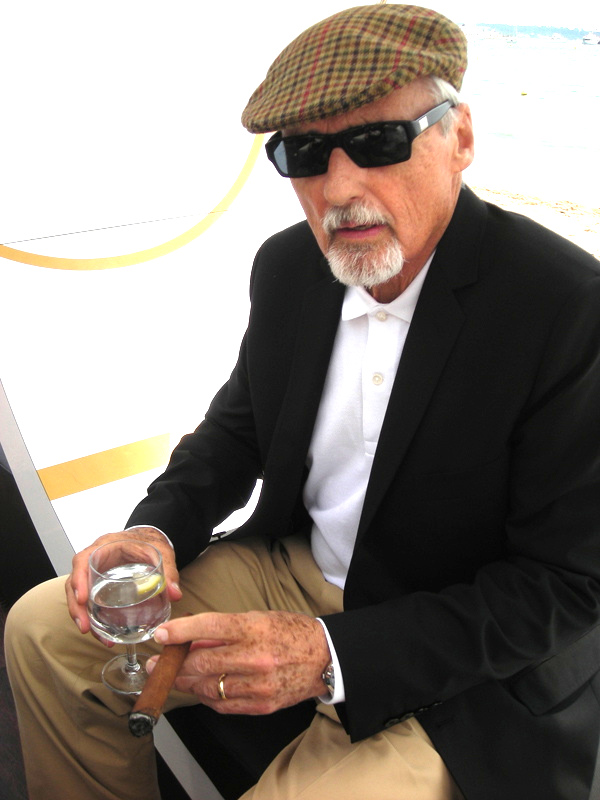
Hopper in June 2008

Dennis Hopper (May 17, 1936 – May 29, 2010) was an American actor, director, writer, film editor, photographer and artist. He made his first television appearance in 1955, and appeared in two films featuring James Dean, Rebel Without a Cause (1955) and Giant (1956). Over the next ten years, Hopper appeared frequently on television in guest roles, and by the end of the 1960s had played supporting roles in several films.

He directed and starred in Easy Rider (1969), winning an award at the Cannes Film Festival and was nominated for an Academy Award for Best Writing (Original Screenplay) as co-writer. He had a featured role in Apocalypse Now (1979). He subsequently appeared in Rumble Fish (1983) and The Osterman Weekend (1983), and received critical recognition for his work in Blue Velvet and Hoosiers, with the latter film garnering him an Academy Award nomination for Best Supporting Actor. He directed Colors (1988). Hopper starred in the 1990 Motion Picture Flashback which was inspired by the 1960s Love Movement. He also played the villains King Koopa in Super Mario Bros (1993), and Howard Payne in Speed (1994). A total of six films starring Dennis Hopper have been selected for preservation in the National Film Registry. Hopper died of prostate cancer on May 29, 2010, 12 days after his 74th birthday and two months after he received a star on the Hollywood Walk of Fame.

== Filmography ==
Hopper's film career spanned 55 years and encompassed appearances in over 150 films. Of those films: Rebel Without a Cause, Giant, Cool Hand Luke, Easy Rider, Apocalypse Now, and Hoosiers have been selected for preservation in the National Film Registry.

=== As actor ===
Year	Title	Role	Notes
1955	Rebel Without a Cause^{[I]}	Goon	
1955	I Died a Thousand Times	Joe	Uncredited
1956	Giant^{[I]}	Jordan Benedict III	
1957	Gunfight at the O.K. Corral	Billy Clanton	
1957	The Story of Mankind	Napoleon Bonaparte	
1957	Sayonara	MP In Kelly's House / MP At Tokyo Airport	Voice, Uncredited
1958	From Hell to Texas	Tom Boyd	
1959	The Young Land	Hatfield Carnes	
1960	Key Witness	William "Cowboy" Tomkins	
1961	Night Tide	Johnny Drake	
1964	The Thirteen Most Beautiful Boys		Short film
1964	Tarzan and Jane Regained... Sort of		
1965	The Sons of Katie Elder	Dave Hastings	
1966	Queen of Blood	Paul Grant	
1967	The Trip	Max	
1967	Cool Hand Luke^{[I]}	Babalugats	
1967	Luke	Himself	Short film
1967	The Glory Stompers	Chino	
1968	Panic in the City	Goff	
1968	Hang 'Em High	The Prophet	
1968	Head	Long Haired Guy In Restaurant	Extra, uncredited
1969	Easy Rider^{[I]}	Billy	
1969	True Grit	Moon	
1970	The Festival Game	Himself	Documentary
1971	The Last Movie	Kansas	
1971	The American Dreamer	Himself	Documentary
1972	Crush Proof	Himself	Cameo
1973	Kid Blue	Bickford Waner	
1975	Bloodbath	Chicken	
1976	Mad Dog Morgan	Daniel Morgan	
1977	Tracks	1st Sergeant Jack Falen	
1977	The American Friend	Tom Ripley	
1977	The Sorcerer's Apprentice	A Spy	
1978	Flesh Color	Mel	
1978	CIA contro KGB	Medford	
1979	Apocalypse Now^{[I]}	Photojournalist	
1980	Out of the Blue	Don	
1981	King of the Mountain	Cal	
1981	Reborn	Reverend Tom Hartley	
1982	Human Highway	Cracker	
1983	Rumble Fish	Father	
1983	The Osterman Weekend	Richard Tremayne	
1983	White Star	Kenneth Barlow	
1984	Jungle Warriors		Deleted scenes
1984	The Inside Man	Miller	
1985	A Hero of Our Time	The Mogul	Short film
1985	O.C. and Stiggs	Sponson	
1985	My Science Project	Bob Roberts	
1986	Riders of the Storm	The Captain	
1986	The Texas Chainsaw Massacre 2	Lieutenant "Lefty" Enright	
1986	River's Edge	Feck	
1986	Blue Velvet	Frank Booth	
1986	Hoosiers^{[I]}	Shooter	
1987	Black Widow	Ben Dumers	
1987	Straight to Hell	IG Farben	
1987	Running Out of Luck	Video Director	
1987	The Pick-up Artist	"Flash" Jensen	
1989	Blood Red	William Bradford Berrigan	
1989	Chattahoochee	Walker Benson	
1989	Drawing the Line: A Portrait of Keith Haring	Himself	Documentary short film
1990	Flashback	Huey Walker	
1990	Catchfire	Milo	
1991	The Indian Runner	Caesar	
1991	Eye of the Storm	Marvin Gladstone	
1991	Hearts of Darkness: A Filmmaker's Apocalypse	Himself	Documentary
1992	Sunset Heat	Carl Madson	
1993	Boiling Point	Rudolph "Red" Diamond	
1993	Red Rock West	Lyle, From Dallas	
1993	Super Mario Bros.	King Koopa	
1993	True Romance	Clifford Worley	
1994	Chasers	"Doggie"	
1994	Speed	Howard Payne	
1995	Search and Destroy	Dr. Luther Waxling	
1995	Waterworld	Deacon	
1996	Carried Away	Joseph Svenden	
1996	Basquiat	Bruno Bischofberger	
1996	Space Truckers	John Canyon	
1996	The Last Days of Frankie the Fly	Frankie	
1997	The Blackout	Mickey Wayne	
1997	Top of the World	Charles Atlas	
1997	Road Ends	Sheriff Ben Gilchrist	
1997	The Good Life	"Mr. B"	Unreleased
1997	Cannes Man	Himself	Cameo
1997	Who Is Henry Jaglom?	Himself	Documentary
1998	Meet the Deedles	Frank Slater	
1998	Welcome to Hollywood	Himself	Cameo
1998	Lured Innocence	Rick Chambers	
1999	Tycus	Peter Crawford	Direct-to-DVD
1999	EDtv	Henry "Hank" Pekurny	
1999	Straight Shooter	Frank Hector	
1999	Jesus' Son	Bill	
1999	The Venice Project	Roland / Salvatore	
1999	Bad City Blues	Cleveland Carter	
1999	Robert Rauschenberg: Inventive Genius	The Narrator	Voice; Documentary
1999	The Source	William S. Burroughs	Documentary
2000	The Apostate	Lewis Garou	
2000	The Prophet's Game	Vincent Swan	Direct-to-DVD
2000	The Spreading Ground	Detective Ed DeLongpre	
2000	Luck of the Draw	Giani Ponti	Direct-to-DVD
2000	Held for Ransom	J.D.	Direct-to-DVD
2001	Ticker	Alex Swan	Direct-to-DVD
2001	Choke	Henry Clark	Direct-to-DVD
2001	Knockaround Guys	Benny Chains	
2001	L.A.P.D.: To Protect and to Serve	Captain Elsworth	Direct-to-DVD
2002	Unspeakable	Warden Earl Blakely	
2002	Leo	Horace	
2002	The Piano Player	Robert Nile	Direct-to-DVD
2003	The Night We Called It a Day	Frank Sinatra	
2003	New Scenes from America	Himself – Actor	Short film
2003	Easy Riders, Raging Bulls	Himself	Documentary
2004	Legacy	CHP Officer	Short film
2004	Out of Season	Harry Barlow	
2004	The Keeper	Lieutenant Joe Krebs	
2005	Americano	Riccardo	Direct-to-DVD
2005	House of 9	Father Duffy	
2005	The Crow: Wicked Prayer	"El Niño"	Direct-to-DVD
2005	Land of the Dead	Paul Kaufman	
2005	Inside Deep Throat	The Narrator	Voice; Documentary
2005	Sketches of Frank Gehry	Himself	Documentary
2006	Hoboken Hollow	Sheriff Greer	
2006	10th & Wolf	Matty Matello	
2006	Memory	Max Lichtenstein	
2006	Rising Son: The Legend of Skateboarder Christian Hosoi	The Narrator	Voice; Documentary
2006	Andy Warhol: A Documentary Film	Himself	Documentary
2008	Sleepwalking	Mr. Reedy	
2008	Hell Ride	Eddie "Zero"	
2008	Elegy	George O'Hearn	
2008	Swing Vote	Donald Greenleaf	
2008	Palermo Shooting	Frank	
2008	An American Carol	The Judge	
2008	Not Quite Hollywood: The Wild, Untold Story of Ozploitation!	Himself	Documentary
2008	Bananaz	Himself	Documentary
2010	Alpha and Omega	Tony	Voice; Released posthumously
2016	The Last Film Festival	Nick Twain	Released posthumously
2018	The Other Side of the Wind	Himself	Cameo; Released posthumously
2020	Jay Sebring....Cutting to the Truth	Himself	Documentary; Released posthumously

I denotes film preservation in the United States National Film Registry.

=== Filmmaking credits ===
Year	Title	Director	Writer	Notes
1964	Mary Jennifer at the Beach	Yes	Unknown	Short film
1967	The Trip	2nd unit	No	Uncredited
1969	Easy Rider	Yes	Yes	
1971	The American Dreamer	No	Yes	Documentary
1971	The Last Movie	Yes	Story	Also editor
1980	Out of the Blue	Yes	Uncredited	
1988	Colors	Yes	No	
1990	Catchfire	Yes	No	Credited as Alan Smithee
1990	The Hot Spot	Yes	No	
1994	Chasers	Yes	No	
2000	Homeless	Yes	No	Short film
2008	Pashmy Dream	Yes	Yes	Short film

== Television ==
Early in his career, Hopper made multiple appearances on television series, beginning with a single appearance on the anthology series Cavalcade of America. Hopper continued guest starring on television throughout the 1950s and '60s. Late in his career, Hopper returned to television with a recurring role on 24, a one-time appearance on Las Vegas, and starring roles on E-Ring and Crash.

Year	Title	Role	Notes
1954	Cavalcade of America	Unknown Role	Episode: "A Medal for Miss Walker"
1955	Medic	Robert	Episode: "Boy in the Storm"
1955	Public Defender	Frankie	Episode: "Mama's Boy"
1955	The Loretta Young Show	Ross Morton	Episode: "Inga II"
1956	Kings Row	Tod Monaghan	Episode: "Carnival"
1956	Screen Directors Playhouse	Steve Redman	Episode: "High Air"
1956	The Kaiser Aluminum Hour	Pauly	Episode: "Carnival"
1956–1957	Cheyenne	Abe Larson / Utah Kid / Roden's Ranch Hand	3 episodes
1957	Conflict	Ed Novak	2 episodes
1957	Sugarfoot	Billy The Kid	Episode: "Brannigan's Boots"
1958	Studio One	David Williams	2 episodes
1958	Swiss Family Robinson	Fritz	Television film
1958–1959	Dick Powell's Zane Grey Theatre	Vernon "Vern" Tippert / Denny Sunrise	2 episodes
1958–1959	The Rifleman	Vernon Tippert / Johnny Clover	2 episodes
1959	The Lineup	Leighton	Episode: "Wake Up to Terror"
1960	The Betty Hutton Show	Mike	Episode: "Goldie Meets Mike"
1960	The Millionaire	Adam Spencer	Episode: "Millionaire Julie Sherman"
1960	The Barbara Stanwyck Show	Gerald Collins	Episode: "No One"
1961	Naked City	Vinnie Winford	Episode: "Shoes for Vinnie Winford"
1961	87th Precinct	Andrew Mason	Episode: "My Friend, My Enemy"
1961	The Investigators	Adrian Brewster	Episode: "The Mind's Own Fire"
1962	General Electric Theater	Fred Judson	Episode: "The Hold-Out"
1962	Surfside 6	Trask	Episode: "Vendetta Arms"
1962–1963	The Defenders	Alfred Carter Jr. / Jason Thomas	2 episodes
1963	The Twilight Zone	Peter Vollmer	Episode: "He's Alive"
1963	The Dakotas	Ross Kendrick	Episode: "Requiem at Dancer's Hill"
1963	Wagon Train	Emmett Lawton	Episode: "The Emmett Lawton Story"
1963	Espionage	Ferno	Episode: "The Weakling"
1963	The Greatest Show on Earth	Rhymer	Episode: "The Wrecker"
1964	Petticoat Junction	Alan Landman	Episode: "Bobbie Jo and the Beatnik"
1964	Arrest and Trial	Coley Mitchum	Episode: "People in Glass Houses"
1964	The Lieutenant	Peter Devlin	Episode: "To Set It Right"
1964	Bonanza	Dev Farnum	Episode: "The Dark Past"
1965	Gunsmoke	Billy Kimbo	Episode: "One Killer on Ice"
1965	Convoy	Roger Small	Episode: The Many Colors of Courage"
1966	The Legend of Jesse James	Jud Salt	Episode: "South Wind"
1966	The Time Tunnel	Passenger	Episode: "Rendezvous with Yesterday"
1967	Combat!	Zack Fielder	Episode: "A Little Jazz"
1967	The Guns of Will Sonnett	Vern Reed	Episode: "Find a Sonnett, Kill a Sonnett"
1967	The Big Valley	Leon Grell / Jimmy Sweetwater	2 episodes
1980	Wild Times	Doc Holliday	2 episodes
1985	Stark	Lieutenant Ron Bliss	Television film
1986	Stark: Mirror Image	Lieutenant Ron Bliss	Television film
1987, 1990	Saturday Night Live	Himself (host)	2 episodes
1989	Black Leather Jacket	The Narrator	Voice; Television film
1991	Doublecrossed	Barry Seal	Television film
1991	Paris Trout	Paris Trout	Television film
1991	Fishing with John	Himself	Episode: "Dennis Hopper Parts 1 & 2"
1992	Nails	Harry "Nails" Niles	Television film
1992	The Heart of Justice	Austin Blair	Television film
1994	Witch Hunt	H. P. Lovecraft	Television film
1995	Dennis Hopper: L.A. Blues	Himself (host)	Television special
1996	Samson and Delilah	Generale Tariq	Television film
1997	King of the Hill	Himself (guest voice)	Episode: "Hank's Got The Willies"
2000	Jason and the Argonauts	Pelias	2 episodes
2002	24	Victor Drazen	5 episodes
2002	Flatland	Smith	Pilot
2002	The Groovenians	Dad / King Norman	Voice; Television short
2002	Firestarter: Rekindled	James Richardson	2 episodes
2003	Suspense	The Narrator	Voice; Television film
2004	Las Vegas	Jon Castille	Episode: "New Orleans"
2004	The Last Ride	Ronnie Purnell	Television film
2005–2006	E-Ring	Colonel Eli McNulty	23 episodes
2007	Entourage	Himself	Episode: "Malibooty"
2008–2009	Crash	Ben Cendars	26 episodes

== Video games ==
Year	Title	Role	Notes
1994	Hell: A Cyberpunk Thriller	Mr. Beautiful	Voice
1998	Black Dahlia	Walter Pensky	
2002	Grand Theft Auto: Vice City	Steve Scott	Voice
2009	Deadly Creatures	George Struggs	Voice
