= Empires & Allies =

2011 video game

Empires and Allies
- Developer: Zynga Los Angeles
- Publisher: Zynga
- Platform: Adobe Flash
- Release: June 1, 2011
- Genres: Simulation, role-playing, Turn-based strategy
- Modes: Single-player, multiplayer

Empires & Allies was a social network game that was Zynga's first combat and strategy game. The game, the first release by Zynga's Los Angeles studio, launched in twelve languages on June 1, 2011. G4TV.com writer Jake Gaskill called the release the "biggest launch of any Zynga title to date". Empires & Allies became the fourth most popular game on Facebook within weeks after launch, reaching 33 million monthly active users by the third week of June. The game was a freemium game, meaning there was no cost to play but players had the option of purchasing premium content. The game was taken offline on June 17, 2013.

On May 5, 2015, Empires & Allies was revived and re-released as an entirely different mobile game on Apple's App Store and Google Play worldwide. The old Facebook page was repurposed for this game.

== Empire Points ==
Empire Points are used to sell certain items. Players get 15 empire points when starting the game and have to pay to get more. Additional Empire Points can be purchased in-game, from Zynga's Website, via game cards from some local stores or by completing certain in-game goals.

== Setting ==
Empires & Allies portrays a military cartoon world composed mostly of archipelagos with each player beginning with one island, and being able to expand to up to four other islands. Each archipelago represents an "empire" or militarized island nation, with a "world alliance" that the player can optionally enter, but by doing so forfeits an ability to attack other sovereign nations. The player's task is to recover their island nation's glory and defeat the main villain, "The Raven," and his commanders, who each have covered a separate archipelago that the player must island hop until the end of the "chain" which is the island that "The Raven" resides on.

The game begins with a massive enemy attack which all but demolishes the player's nation, in a quest for revenge, the player is dragged into a war against the aggressors, uncovering their reasoning for the attack. It is later revealed that the player's island contains a valuable ore that the enemy requires for a super weapon, which the player is tasked to stop at all costs. The player meets several advisors: a civic advisor, a military advisor, a construction advisor, and a mission advisor.

Empires & Allies has the distinction of being Zynga's first graphics based (as opposed to Mafia Wars, which is browser based) game to portray violence and modern warfare. Although the game still retains the graphical style of previous Zynga games such as CityVille and FarmVille, neither of said games portrayed military hardware. Despite all this, Empires & Allies still maintains good humor with enemy commanders having often comedic portrayals and biographies, such as "The Raven" being named such for he couldn't catch an eagle and instead settled on a raven.

Within nine days, Empires & Allies had gained nearly 10 million users.

== Gameplay ==
The basic gameplay consists of two parts: building an island city where buildings can be constructed to support production of materials required to build military units and further buildings; and performing asynchronous turn-based combat with a rock-paper-scissors mechanic between units of different types. Experience can be gained through both combat and the production of resources and units, and allows the player to unlock stronger units and more productive buildings.

This game regularly featured multiple concurrent events where a limited-edition award is awarded to the player upon the successful completion of this event, besides the main campaign.

Social mechanic is heavily emphasized in this game, since each player can normally produce one type of ore, and that the production of many units and the progression through events and campaigns require different types of ores and or asking the player's friends for the required parts.

== Closure ==
On April 24, 2013, it was announced that the game would shut down along with three other games: The Ville, Dream Zoo, and Zynga City (a game which exists on Tencent). The game's closure date was announced as June 17, 2013 on May 16.
