= Mark Skaggs =

American video game producer and executive

- Occupation: Video game producer

Mark Skaggs is an American video game producer and executive. Skaggs is known for leading the team that created the Facebook game FarmVille for Zynga, leading the team that created CityVille. He served as Executive Producer and product lead for the PC real-time strategy games Command & Conquer: Red Alert 2, Command & Conquer: Generals, and The Lord of the Rings: The Battle for Middle-earth.

== Career ==
Skaggs founded Tetragon, Inc. in 1993, a small company that developed a console game called NanoTek Warrior, released in 1997 through Virgin Interactive. Skaggs and Tetragon also worked for GameTek on the PC game Hell: A Cyberpunk Thriller. Skaggs later joined Westwood Studios as an Executive Producer.

=== Electronic Arts ===
After Westwood was acquired by Electronic Arts in 1998, Skaggs oversaw the creation of a series of hit real-time strategy games as vice president and Executive Producer at EA. His Westwood Studio in Irvine, California became known as EA Pacific.

His first major RTS project was Command & Conquer: Red Alert 2, released in 2000, followed by its expansion pack Yuri's Revenge in 2001. Skaggs then led the team making Command & Conquer: Generals, released in 2003, notable because of its high quality 3D graphics and because it established a third product line in the Command & Conquer series (alongside the Tiberian and Red Alert games). The expansion pack for Generals was called Zero Hour, also released in 2003. EA Pacific was relocated to Los Angeles in 2003, becoming a part of EA Los Angeles. The last major EA RTS game helmed by Skaggs was The Lord of the Rings: The Battle for Middle-earth, released in 2004.

In 2005, Skaggs left EA to become COO for Trilogy Studios.

=== Zynga ===
Skaggs joined Zynga in 2008 and led the teams that built the Facebook games FarmVille and CityVille. He also led teams making other games at Zynga including The Ville, Treasure Isle, and the mobile version of Empires & Allies.

In 2015, Skaggs left Zynga. He joined India's Moonfrog Labs in 2016 as a game designer and board member, developing mobile games for the Indian market.
