= Julian Rignall =

British journalist

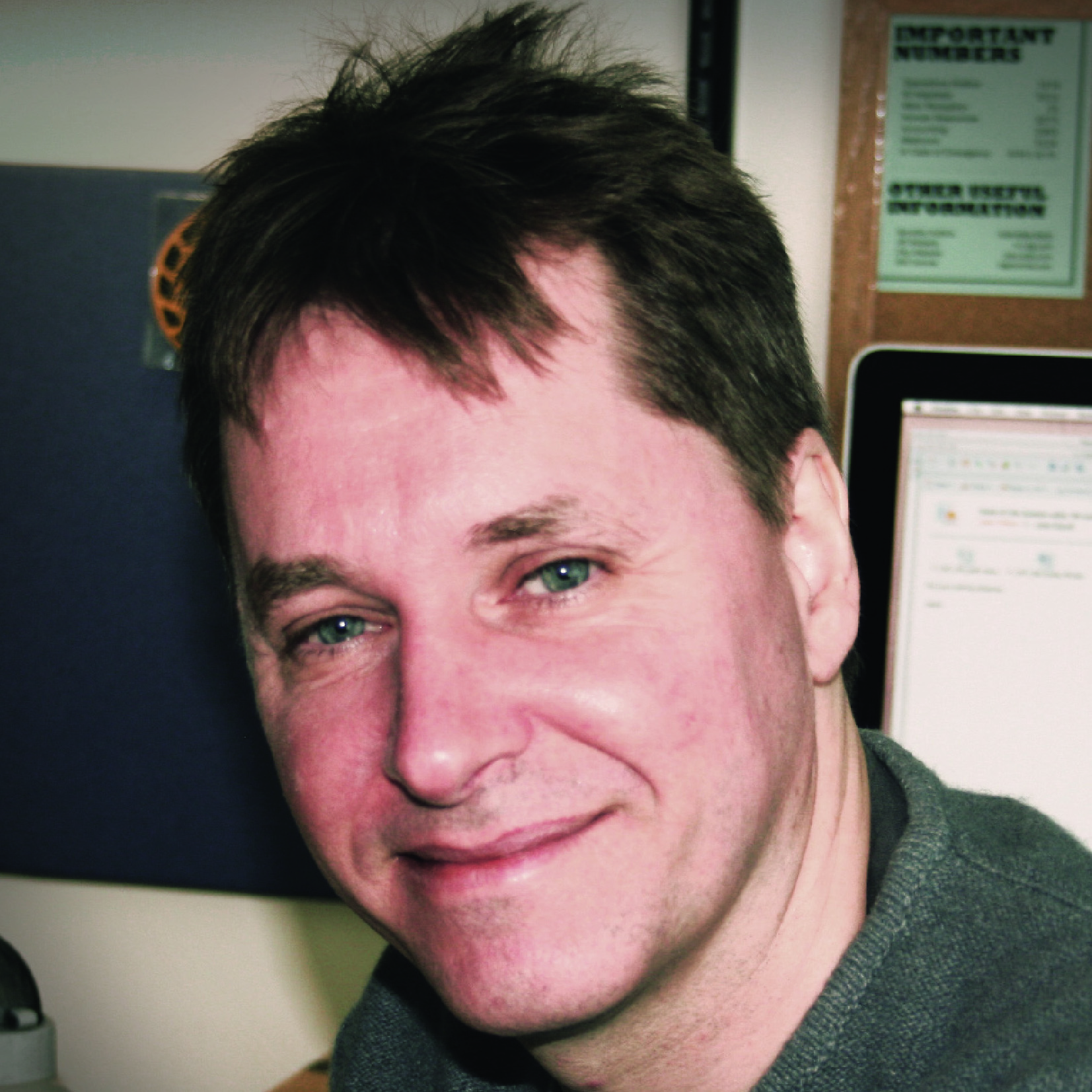
- Born: 6 March 1965 (age 61); London, England
- Occupations: Writer, editor
- Writing career
- Subjects: Video games and gaming

Julian "Jaz" Rignall (born 6 March 1965) is a British writer and editor. He has also produced content for corporate websites such as GamePro Media, publisher of GamePro magazine and GamePro.com, marketing collateral and advertising campaigns.

== Career ==
=== Early 1980s: Teenage gaming journalist ===
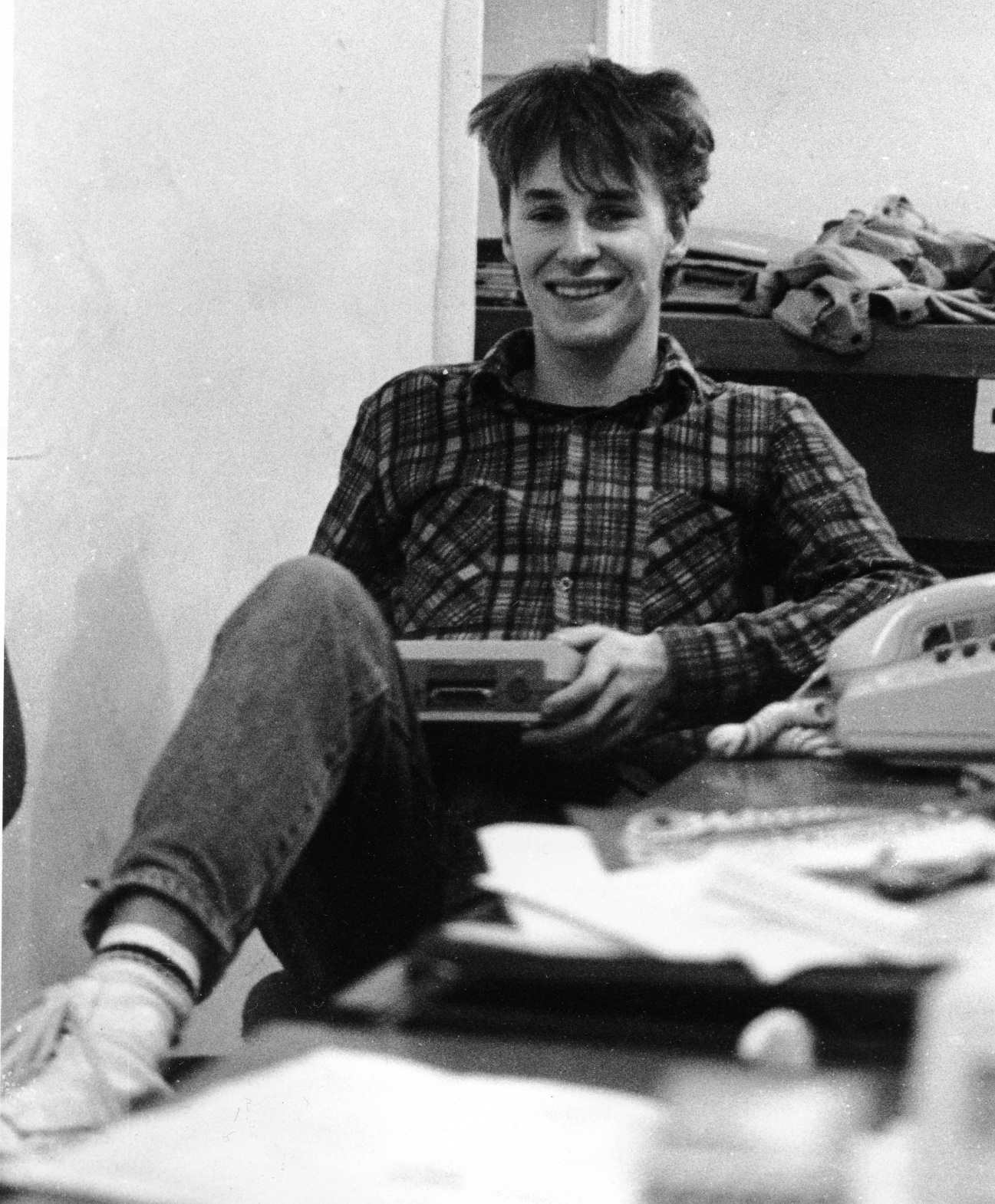
Rignall at ZZAP! 64 offices in Somerset, 1985

Rignall's career as a gaming journalist began in London in the early 1980s as a student competing in video game tournaments. During his teenage years, Rignall held the UK and World Record high scores on video games such as Defender, Pole Position and Crossfire. He also won Computer and Video Games magazine's 1983 UK Video Arcade Game Championship, beating more than 500 of the country's top arcade players to win the title. Rignall's success at winning international video game tournaments launched his career as a video game journalist writing gaming hints and tips for magazines such as Computer and Video Games and Personal Computer Games.

=== 1985–1988: First magazine launch ===
In 1985, the former editor of Personal Computer Games, Chris Anderson, invited Rignall to join the launch team for Newsfield Publications' Commodore 64 magazine, Zzap!64. Rignall admitted that when asked about Commodore 64 games he described his experience of playing the Atari versions, as he had no experience of the 64 at the time. As a staff writer, Rignall continued to display his gameplaying abilities as he repeatedly emerged the victor of the monthly ZZAP! Challenge, where readers challenged the magazine's reviewers to one-on-one gaming contests.

In December 1987, Rignall became editor of Zzap!64, a position he retained until August 1988 (Issue 39).

=== 1988–1993: EMAP publications, media appearances ===
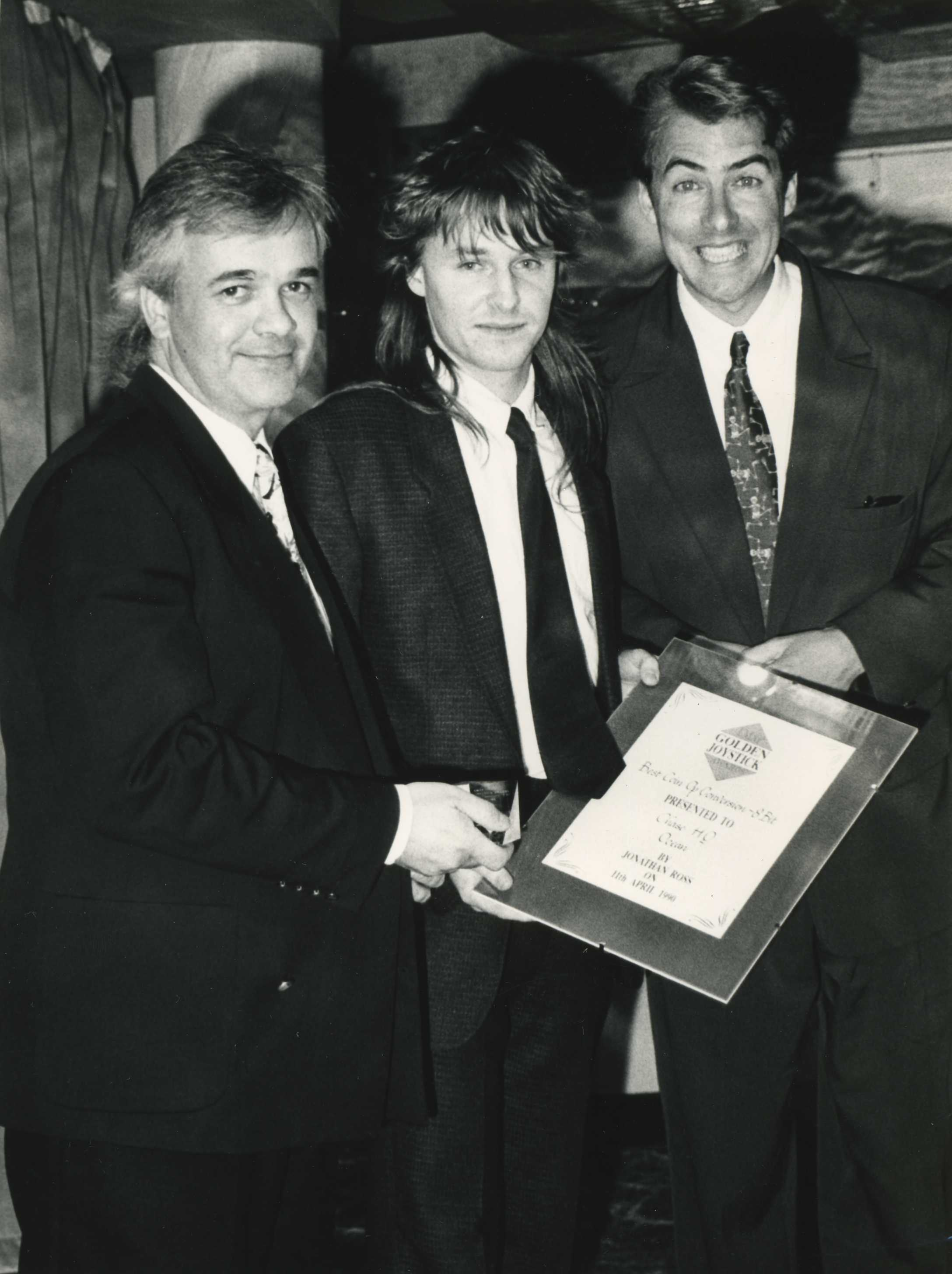
Rignall and Jonathan Ross at the 1990 Golden Joystick Awards

In 1988, Rignall joined Computer and Video Games magazine, an EMAP publication. Upon his promotion to editor, Rignall changed the magazine's editorial direction focusing more on the newly emerging Japanese video game consoles instead of the fading 8-bit generation of microcomputers.

In 1990, recognising the console market was large enough to warrant a magazine of its own, Rignall launched Mean Machines. Covering the top-selling video game systems of the time, such as the Super NES and Mega Drive, Mean Machines became the largest-selling multi-platform publication in the United Kingdom. At first the print run of the magazine was kept limited, to create demand. In 1992, Mean Machines was split into two separate publications: the officially endorsed Nintendo Magazine System, now known as Official Nintendo Magazine, and Mean Machines Sega.

In late 1993, Rignall launched his final British publication, the officially endorsed Sega Magazine.

During this period, Rignall appeared regularly on TV as a games reviewer on the British TV programme GamesMaster, and made numerous appearances on BBC Television and BBC Radio as an industry commentator and field expert.

=== 1994–1997: US software development ===
In 1994, Rignall transitioned from magazine publishing to software development, joining Virgin Interactive Entertainment in Irvine, California. As vice-president of design, he was responsible for product design and licensing acquisitions from other game developers and publishers. While at Virgin, Rignall contributed to such titles as Agile Warrior F-111X, NanoTek Warrior, The Lion King, The Jungle Book and the highly anticipated, but never published, Thrill Kill.

=== 1997–2002: IGN expansion ===
In 1997, Rignall left Virgin and moved to San Francisco, California, to join the Imagine Games Network (IGN). As editorial director, he led the expansion of the online network guiding it to its market leadership position. In 2001, IGN was awarded a People's Voice Webby Award. The editorial tone and style Rignall helped establish in IGN's early years still continue to this day.

=== 2002–2007: Online retailing and marketing ===
During 2002, Rignall shifted from the games business into online retailing and marketing. He became editorial director at Walmart.com responsible for the content of the world's biggest retailer's online presence. Rignall has stated that he did not enjoy the experience but "did learn an unbelievable amount from [it]." In 2004, Rignall moved to Haggin Marketing, a San Francisco advertising agency where he created print advertisements and other marketing vehicles for Dell, Inc. In 2006, Rignall became the vice-president and editorial creative director with Bank of America's user-centred design and research division where he developed consumer, business and marketing content for the company's 22 million website customers.

=== 2007–2010: Future Plus Custom Publishing ===
In August 2007, Rignall rejoined Future US (formerly Imagine Media) to help launch the US branch of their UK-based custom publishing division, Future Plus. He spent three years at Future Plus writing for companies such as Best Buy, Kmart, Apple, Blizzard-Activision, Toys "R" Us and Research in Motion/BlackBerry. Future US's custom content portfolio included publications like Best Buys @gamer magazine and Blizzard Entertainment's World of Warcraft: The Magazine. In 2008, Future Plus was awarded a Pearl "Gold" Award by the Custom Publishing Council for its Guide 2 Gaming produced on behalf of Best Buy.

=== 2010–2011: GamePro Media ===
On 8 November 2010, GamePro Media appointed Rignall as vice-president of content. His first "From the Editor" column appeared in GamePro's February 2011 issue.

=== 2013–2017: USGamer ===
In March 2013, Rignall developed the USGamer website for Gamer Network, and was the Editorial Lead before moving to Editor-at-Large.
