= Ripper (video game) =

1996 video game

- Developer: Take-Two Interactive
- Publisher: Take-Two Interactive
- Director: Phil Parmet
- Producers: Mark E. Seremet; Chris Short
- Programmer: Greg Brown
- Artist: James H. Dargie
- Writers: F.J. Lennon; John Antinori; Dennis Johnson
- Composer: Michael Bross
- Platforms: MS-DOS, Macintosh
- Release: NA: March 4, 1996; EU: 1996
- Genres: Interactive movie, point-and-click adventure
- Mode: Single-player

Ripper is a 1996 interactive movie point-and-click adventure game developed and published by Take-Two Interactive for MS-DOS and Macintosh. The cast includes Scott Cohen, Christopher Walken, Paul Giamatti, Karen Allen, Burgess Meredith, (Note: In his final performance before his death the following year) David Patrick Kelly, Ossie Davis, and John Rhys-Davies. It also uses the Blue Öyster Cult song "(Don't Fear) The Reaper". The villain of the game is chosen at random from the four main characters. A limited number of the clues and puzzles, plus a single line of dialogue in the ending, change according to the villain's identity.

In 1996, home ports for the Saturn and PlayStation were announced, but these did not ship. Ripper is the second of the three Take-Two developed full-motion video-based adventure games, the other two being Hell: A Cyberpunk Thriller and Black Dahlia.

== Plot ==
Ripper takes place in New York City in the year 2040. It opens with the investigation of the recent murder of Renee Stein, (Note: Renee Stein's actress is credited only as "Alexa".) the third victim of a serial killer known as "The Ripper", named for their similar modus operandi to Jack the Ripper's. The player assumes the role of Jake Quinlan (Scott Cohen), a reporter for the Virtual Herald, to whom The Ripper sends messages detailing his murders. (Note: An act attributed to Jack the Ripper, although no letters have been proven to come from him) Along with the police, whose investigation is headed by Detective Vincent Magnotta (Christopher Walken), Quinlan is seeking The Ripper's true identity.

After investigating Stein's murder, Quinlan receives a message from The Ripper, who warns Quinlan that his girlfriend, Catherine Powell (Tahnee Welch), will be the next victim, as she has gotten too close to discovering his identity. Quinlan finds Powell still alive but in a deep coma. Cybersurgeon Clare Burton (Karen Allen) of the Tribeca Center Hospital manages to retrieve a distorted image of Powell's attacker, but she requires additional information from Quinlan to make it clearer. (Note: A reference to Jack the Ripper, as the police hypothesized that they might be able to get an image of the killer from the retinas of the victims) He studies Powell's investigation and hones in on three possible suspects for the murders. To transmit this information into Powell's brain directly, he enlists the help of Joey Falconetti (David Patrick Kelly), a hacker who specializes in interfacing directly with the human brain.

Quinlan discovers that all of The Ripper's victims and all of those associated with the investigation of The Ripper (except Quinlan himself) were involved with an old gaming group known as the Web Runners, who played a game based on the Jack the Ripper mystery. The last session of this game somehow caused one of the players – Catherine Powell's mother – to die in real life. Assistance from a pathologist named Vic Farley (Peter Boyden) reveals that The Ripper's murders were done by placing a code into a victim's brain while in cyberspace that caused their internal body pressure to rise to a point of explosion, which Farley experiences immediately after providing his explanation. Quinlan also finds a cyberspace weapon developed by a murdered cyber-architect named Hamilton Wofford (Burgess Meredith), designed specifically to kill The Ripper inside a virtual recreation of the historic Whitechapel district of London, where the Jack the Ripper murders took place. After assembling the weapon and gathering protection from The Ripper's weapon, Quinlan enters cyberspace, kills The Ripper, and leaves the virtual Whitechapel in time to escape its destruction.

The Ripper can be one of four possible suspects: Joey Falconetti, Clare Burton, Vincent Magnotta, or Catherine Powell. With each playthrough, certain clues and the actual identity of The Ripper vary, though the bulk of the story is unchanged, and clues indicating the guilt of all four suspects will appear regardless of who the killer is. For instance, Catherine Powell experiences mysterious surges in brain wave activity that coincide with all the Ripper's murders regardless of whether or not she actually is the Ripper, and no alternative explanation for these surges is provided. However, the changes in the game's story and puzzles are limited to the game's third act – after Farley's death.

== Cast ==
- Christopher Walken as Detective Vincent Magnotta – A violent police officer with a romantic interest in Clare Burton and a vendetta against Falconetti.
- Burgess Meredith as brothers Hamilton Wofford & Covington Wofford – Hamilton was a cyber-architect who was hired by The Ripper to build a replica of Whitechapel before being murdered, and Covington is a recluse who has gradually lost his sanity.
- Karen Allen as Dr. Clare Lynn Burton – A brilliant but cold and distant doctor who specializes in the human brain and treats Catherine Powell while she's comatose.
- David Patrick Kelly as Joey Falconetti – A brilliant but violent and disturbed computer hacker who previously divorced from Clare Burton after being arrested by Magnotta.
- Scott Cohen as Jake Quinlan – An investigative reporter for the Virtual Herald who writes about the Ripper murders and regularly receives messages from The Ripper.
- Ossie Davis as Ben Dodds – the editor of the Virtual Herald.
- John Rhys-Davies as Vigo Haman – A mobster with information regarding Clare Burton.
- Tahnee Welch as Catherine Powell – Quinlan's co-worker and lover who began investigating The Ripper behind Quinlan's back, hoping to take the story and launch her own career as a reporter.
- Jimmie Walker as Soap Beatty – A computer hacker and one of Catherine Powell's primary sources in her investigation.
- Steven Randazzo as Sgt. Lou Brannon – A rare non-corrupt cop who gives Quinlan information about Magnotta's suspicious activities.
- Peter Boyden as Vic Farley – A friendly pathologist who is trying to figure out how the Ripper commits his murders.
- Paul Giamatti as Dr. Bud Cable – A doctor tending to Catherine Powell.
- MacIntyre Dixon as Gambit Nelson – A cyberspace entrepreneur who gives Quinlan information about Falconetti.
- Lianna Pai as Kashi Yamamoto – A current Web Runner who gives Quinlan information about the Runners' history.
- David Thornton as Twig – An assistant who maintains Falconetti's computer hacking equipment.
- Kira Arne as Vivien Santiago – The receptionist at the hospital who flirts with Quinlan and informs him of suspicious activities at the hospital.
- William Seymour as Bob Eppels – A pathologist who replaces Farley after Farley is fired.
- Richard Bright as Dr. Karl Stasiak – A forensic photographer and a trusted source of Quinlan's.
- Phyllis Bash as Prof. Lillian Bech – A professor with information regarding Clare Burton's past.
- Lisa Summerour as an attendant at the gym Clare Burton frequents.
- Dan Moran as a bartender at the Cafe Duchamp.
- Richard Spore as George Rhodes – A loan officer at the Pan Financial Bank and a source of Catherine Powell's.
- John Ventimiglia as Warren Spankowski – A police officer who guards the evidence room.
- Anna Thomson as a prostitute who is violently interrogated by Magnotta.
- Brian Tarantino as a drug addict and dealer who is violently interrogated by Magnotta.
- Mary Ann Urbano as Dr. Pezzi.
- Deborah Lee Johnson as Stephanie Jordan – A former Web Runner who is murdered by The Ripper.
- Alexa as a Renee Stein – A book publisher and former Web Runner who is murdered by The Ripper.
- Buster Maxwell as Maximum Cain.
- Natalie Baker as the Web Runners' WELL and Josey Dorsett, the latter of whom was a former Web Runner before being murdered.
- Phyllis Goodis as the voice of a librarian at the virtual public library.

== Development ==
Ripper had a budget of US$4 million (equivalent to $8,200,000 in 2025) and was in development for two years. Considerable effort was focused on the game's full-motion video (FMV) sequences. Paying the game's slew of big-name actors cost nearly 25% of the game's entire budget, and cinematographer Phil Parmet was brought on to direct the video segments. Writer and lead designer F. J. Lennon commented: "The whole industry wants to crucify FMV, people claim FMV doesn't belong in game, but if it's done professionally, I think it can work." The game engine was created from scratch. It can change resolution between 640x480 and 320x200 on the fly. Ripper was launched on March 4, 1996. In 1996, home ports for the Saturn and PlayStation were announced, but these did not ship.

== Reception ==
Reception

Aggregate score
Aggregator	Score
GameRankings	71.50%

Review scores
Publication	Score
Next Generation	3/5
PC Gamer (US)	72%
PC PowerPlay	7/10
Computer Games Strategy Plus	3.5/5
Computer Game Review	92/90/93
PC Entertainment	4/5

Take 2 announced shipments of 160,000 copies to retailers during the game's debut week and called it "our biggest game to date". According to Take 2, the game sold over 150,000 units by the end of October 1997 and earned 28.7% of all company revenue during that fiscal year, suggesting that as of October 31, 1997 (eight months after its release), Ripper had achieved sales of approximately $3,587,500. Arinn Dembo of CNET Gamecenter wrote: "[S]low sales, unfortunately, quickly knocked [Ripper] off retail shelves."

The game received an average score of 71.50% at GameRankings, based on an aggregate of four reviews. A reviewer for Next Generation commented: "One minute the game believes it's a graphic adventure, the next it's a movie, and the next it's a puzzle game. If any one of these aspects would be perfected, it could be a gamer's delight. As it stands, the game is mediocre in each category." He specifically criticized that the characters "are so overdone it's just plain funny" and the first-person sequences can't be bypassed, forcing the player to watch the same graphics every time they backtrack.

Jeff Sengstack of NewMedia magazine wrote that Ripper "meets, even exceeds, its pre-release hype", and summarized it as "an engaging horror mystery with immense depth." However, he found fault with the video compression and difficulty.
