= Black Dahlia (video game) =

1998 video game

- Developer: Take-Two Interactive
- Publishers: NA: Interplay Productions; EU: Take-Two Interactive
- Designer: Steve Glasstetter
- Programmer: Greg Brown
- Artists: Jack Snyder; Mike Snyder; James H. Dargie
- Writer: Patrick Freeman
- Composer: Michael Bross
- Platform: Microsoft Windows
- Release: NA: February 25, 1998; EU: 1998
- Genres: Interactive movie, Point-and-click adventure
- Mode: Single-player

Black Dahlia is an interactive movie point-and-click adventure game that was released on February 25, 1998 by Take-Two Interactive. It is the last of three full-motion video adventure games developed by Take-Two, the other two being Hell: A Cyberpunk Thriller and Ripper.

The story, while fictional, is inspired by the real life Cleveland Torso Murderer and the infamous murder of Elizabeth Short in Los Angeles.

This interactive movie point-and-click adventure game ties Elizabeth Short's murder to Nazis and occult rituals which the player has to investigate. The game featured two major Hollywood actors, Dennis Hopper and Teri Garr.

== Plot ==
Agent Pearson is the newest member of the COI and is somewhat dejected to find the job not as glamorous as he was initially told. After being given a case where a local munitions manufacturer was invited to join the Brotherhood of Thule, an American branch of the Thule society, Pearson is puzzled by the apparent connections with Nazi occultism. Along the way he encounters Agent Winslow, apparently a bumbling Federal agent who is more concerned with his press appearance than solving cases.

After making a connection between the Brotherhood of Thule and the Cleveland torso murders, Pearson leads a local detective to the butchers lair after finding bizarre Gaelic documents left by his predecessor regarding a ritual involving Odin and a gemstone called the Black Dahlia, which is a key instrument that can render a ritual user the ability to control dreams.

Years later, Pearson is a member of the OSI, and recovers the Dahlia from a Nazi bunker, but it is quickly snatched away and then sold on the black market by a corrupt quartermaster. Following the Dahlia, Pearson again encounters Winslow, a Nazi SS operative following the final orders of Hitler to perform the Dahlia ritual.

Pearson pursues Winslow across the US, finally cornering him in a California home, where Winslow has just completed the final ritual murders regarding the Dahlia. After tearing out his own eye and performing the remainder of the ritual, the player has one choice with his pistol. If he shoots Winslow or hesitates, Winslow stabs himself, and possesses Pearson, becoming an American version of Hitler, and able to control large portions of the populace through their dreams. If Pearson destroys the Dahlia, Winslow dies and Pearson is blamed for the locals spree of killings, though he is overjoyed and content with having stopped the Nazi plot to take over the world.

== Reception ==
Reception

Aggregate score
Aggregator	Score
GameRankings	72%

Review scores
Publication	Score
Adventure Gamers	2.5/5
AllGame	4/5
CNET Gamecenter	9/10
Computer Games Strategy Plus	4/5
Computer Gaming World	3/5
GameRevolution	A−
GameSpot	5.9/10
GameStar	64%
Next Generation	2/5
PC Gamer (US)	87%
PC Zone	79%
Entertainment Weekly	B

The game received above-average reviews according to the review aggregation website GameRankings. However, Next Generation said, "The game seems as if it were made to sell hint books, and those who play without one are likely to end up bashing the computer in frustration."

The game was a nominee for CNET Gamecenter's 1998 "Adventure Game of the Year" award, which ultimately went to Grim Fandango. The staff wrote, "With its endless secret doors, encoded messages, locked boxes, and a little gunplay, Black Dahlia did not disappoint."

In 2011, Adventure Gamers named the game the 63rd-best adventure game ever released.
