= Mean Machines =

UK video game magazine (1990–1992)

- Gary Harrod's cover artwork for issue 12
- Editor: Julian Rignall
- Categories: Video game journalism
- Frequency: Monthly
- First issue: October 1990
- Final issue Number: September 1992; 24
- Company: EMAP
- Country: United Kingdom
- Website: www.meanmachinesmag.co.uk
- ISSN: 0960-4952

Mean Machines was a multi-format video game magazine published between 1990 and 1992 in the United Kingdom.

== History ==
In the late 1980s Computer and Video Games (CVG) was largely covering the outgoing generation of 8-bit computers like the Commodore 64, ZX Spectrum, Amstrad CPC and the 16-bit Atari ST and Amiga. Julian Rignall built and launched a consoles-oriented section of the magazine called Mean Machines. The inaugural section was featured in the October 1987 issue of the magazine and largely covered games on 8-bit games systems like the Nintendo Entertainment System and Master System. It included features on newly emerging Japan-only consoles such as the PC Engine.

Over the ensuing months, CVG increased its coverage of consoles and started a 'Mean Machines Megaclub'. At the same time, a new import gaming marketplace started to emerge fueled by demand for these new consoles. Small retailers in Britain began importing consoles and games directly from Japan, modified them for the UK market and sold them on.

Rignall and newly hired designer Gary Harrod spent two weeks planning the design, editorial tone and style, and published Mean Machines Issue Zero: a 16-page test version of the magazine that to elicit feedback from potential advertisers and readers. Only ten of these magazines were published, although a mini version was reprinted and given away free with Issue 15 of the magazine. Another early attempt on covering the video game console market is Complete Guide to Consoles which lasted for four issues and one exclusively for the Sega gaming systems The Complete Guide to Sega.

The first issue covered the Sega Mega Drive, Sega Master System, Nintendo Entertainment System, Game Boy and GX4000 consoles. Within a few months the Amstrad was taken off the market due to poor sales, and the Super Nintendo Entertainment System replaced it in the magazine's focus, making MM a mainly Sega and Nintendo only magazine. Coverage was also given to other machines like the NeoGeo and PC Engine.

Following the lead of parent magazine CVG, Mean Machines covered both domestic and imported releases; this meant that the magazine could review titles that were months away from UK release. At the time, import gaming was more popular than it is now, as increased territory lockouts and swifter UK release dates have made import gaming a relatively niche market.

== Mean Machines Sega and Nintendo Magazine System ==
ISSN 0967-9014 and ISSN 0965-4240

As the UK video games market grew and matured, Sega and Nintendo emerged as the two dominant manufacturers. EMAP split the magazine in two, creating Mean Machines Sega and the officially-endorsed Nintendo Magazine System.

After a successful launch, monthly sales of NMS dropped to a level just below the original Mean Machines at its peak, and the circulation of MMS began to decline, and at the end of 1993, EMAP Images launched the officially endorsed Sega Magazine, which competed with sales of its own independent Sega publication.

The magazine was published until 1997. The staff were then incorporated into Official Sega Saturn Magazine. Nintendo Magazine System became Nintendo Official Magazine ISSN 1466-1748, and continued until the official Nintendo licence was won by Future Publishing. The last Mean Machines magazine was Mean Machines PlayStation ISSN 1364-3746; the original Mean Machines staff had long since moved on. This soon folded after the launch of Official PlayStation Magazine. Only six issues were released.

== Staff ==
Julian Rignall (Editor), Gary Harrod (Designer), Richard Leadbetter (Staff Writer), Radion Automatic (Staff Writer), Oz Browne (Designer), Matt Regan (Staff Writer), Angus Swan (Staff Writer), Paul Glancey (Contributor), and Robert Alan Bright (Staff Writer).

== See also ==
- Video game journalism
- Video game industry
