= Tom Folsom =

- Born: Tom Folsom; 1974 (age 51–52)
- Occupation: Author
- Writing career
- Genre: Nonfiction
- Notable works: Hopper: A Journey into the American Dream, The Mad Ones, Mr. Untouchable
- Website: www.tomfolsom.com

Tom Folsom is a writer living in New York City. He is best known as the author of a bestselling biography of Crazy Joe Gallo, The Mad Ones: Crazy Joe Gallo and the Revolution at the Edge of the Underworld. On March 5, 2013, the It Books imprint of HarperCollins published Folsom's definitive biography on Dennis Hopper, Hopper: A Journey into the American Dream, charting the actor's wide-ranging career and place in American popular culture in art, music, photography and film.

== Background and education ==
Folsom graduated from the University of Georgia in 1996 with a degree in journalism. He also attended New York University.

=== Books ===
Folsom's book, The Mad Ones, was published by Weinstein Books on May 5, 2009, and became a New York Times bestseller. In 2009 the audio book of The Mad Ones was released. Folsom, according to The New York Times, “deftly invokes a wacky world and the kind of characters celebrated by Jack Kerouac.” The title comes from the Jack Kerouac quote, “The only people for me are the mad ones, the ones who are mad to live, mad to talk, mad to be saved, desirous of everything at the same time, the ones who never yawn or say a commonplace thing, but burn, burn, burn.” He is the co-author of a biography of drug-kingpin Leroy Barnes, Mr. Untouchable: The Rise, Fall and Resurrection of Heroin's Teflon Don, written with its subject in Witness Protection.

=== Journalism ===
His documentaries have appeared at Sundance, on A&E and Showtime.

He has also appeared on The Daily Show and NPR's Fresh Air.
