= Dennis Hopper: Photographs, 1961–1967 =

Photography book of Dennis Hopper

- Author: Dennis Hopper
- Language: English
- Genre: Photography
- Publication date: 2009
- Publication place: United States

Dennis Hopper: Photographs, 1961–1967 is a photography book by American actor, filmmaker and photographer Dennis Hopper. It was published, in a limited edition, in 2009, and in a general release, in 2011. It contains a selection of photographs that he took in the 1960s. A second edition, in smaller size, was published in 2018.

== Content ==
Actor Hopper used to carry a camera with him during the 1960s, and brought her to the most diverse events and circumstances, including bullfights in Tijuana, Mexico, happenings in California, and urban scenes. He also photographed several cultural icons of the time, including Ike Turner and Tina Turner, Paul Newman, Andy Warhol, and even Martin Luther King, during the Civil Rights movement march. His photographic work is an important document to the social, cultural and political atmosphere and transformations of the time.

The book was compiled by Hopper himself and by gallerist Tony Shafrazi, and includes introductory essays by Shafrazi and Walter Hopps, a biography, and an afterword, in the general release, by journalist Jessica Hundley.

== Reception ==
The book was critically acclaimed. Magazine Focus Vif stated that it was "A sumptuous volume bringing together the photographs of Dennis Hopper, images captured, for the most part, in the very heart of the effervescence of the 1960s... A reference work, at the artists measure." Magazine Harper’s Bazaar praised it as "A chance to pay tribute to Hopper’s astonishing eye as a photographer." Joanna Elena Batsakis wrote that "The present work is not only important for Hopper’s enthusiasts, but it is fundamental for the development of areas of scholarship that examine the intersections between cinema and visual art."
