= Empires & Allies (2015 video game) =

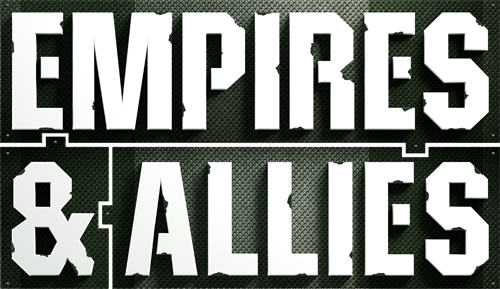
- Publisher: Zynga
- Platforms: Android, iOS
- Release: May 5, 2015
- Genres: Strategy, role-playing
- Modes: Single-player, multiplayer

Empires & Allies was a strategy video game by Zynga. It was released on May 5, 2015, for Android and iOS. The game is a freemium game, meaning there was no cost to play but players had the option of purchasing premium content.

== Gameplay ==
Empires and Allies is a single and multi player game, based on war strategy. The game is identical to the Disney multiplayer game Star Wars Commander which was released one year before Empires and Allies. In 2020 Zynga, the creators of Empires and Allies, acquired the rights to Star Wars Commander and promised the then large community of Star Wars Commander players improvements to the game and then cancelled it six months later.

== Development ==
Empires and Allies was the brainchild of Mark Skaggs. It was started by the former chief executive Don Mattrick and carried on by his replacement Mark Pincus, the original founder of Zynga. The theme of this game is a reboot from its first incarnation, a cartoonish asynchronous combat game with heavy emphasis on social worldbuilding.

== Closure ==
On 2023 January 30, Zynga announced that YoVille will be closed on the end of March after eight years of development. Daily login bonus will grant 250 gold each day, and all processes which require time and premium currency will be greatly reduced.
