= F.J. Lennon =

American novelist

- Born: April 1, 1964 (age 62); Latrobe, Pennsylvania, U.S.
- Education: Saint Vincent College
- Occupations: Novelist; screenwriter
- Children: 2
- Website: www.fjlennon.com

F.J. Lennon (born April 1, 1964) is an American novelist, screenwriter, and independent digital media executive producer, designer, and writer.

== Career ==
During his 25-year career, Lennon has been actively employed in multiple industries including the video game, interactive television, entertainment, advertising, and toy industries.

He is the author of Soul Trapper (Atria, 2011), and Devil's Gate (Emily Bestler Books, 2012) the first two novels in a trilogy of supernatural thrillers that follow the life of rogue ghost hunter, Kane Pryce; Every Mistake in the Book (HarperCollins/Regan Books, 2001), a light-hearted business memoir about Lennon's years in the video game industry, and numerous screenplays and teleplays in various stages of development.

He is the co-founder and Vice President of Paragon Software, which was sold to MicroProse in 1992.

== Personal life ==
Lennon is a 1986 graduate (Magna Cum Laude) of Saint Vincent College in Latrobe, Pennsylvania, where he earned a degree in Communications and a minor in English Literature.

He is a native of Latrobe, Pennsylvania and currently resides in Maryland with his wife and two daughters.
