= Doublecrossed =

- Genre: Action; Drama
- Screenplay by: Roger Young
- Story by: Alex Lasker; Roger Young
- Directed by: Roger Young
- Starring: Dennis Hopper; Robert Carradine; Richard Jenkins; Adrienne Barbeau; Don Hood; G. W. Bailey
- Composer: Richard Bellis
- Country of origin: United States
- Original language: English

Production
- Executive producer: Allen S. Epstein
- Producer: Albert J. Salzer
- Production locations: New Orleans; Puerto Rico
- Cinematography: Donald M. Morgan
- Editor: Benjamin A. Weissman
- Running time: 109 minutes
- Production companies: Green/Epstein Productions; HBO Pictures; Lorimar Television

Original release
- Network: HBO
- Release: July 20, 1991

Doublecrossed is a 1991 American action film written and directed by Roger Young. The film stars Dennis Hopper, Robert Carradine, Richard Jenkins, Adrienne Barbeau, Don Hood and G. W. Bailey. The film premiered on HBO July 20, 1991.

== Plot ==
This film tries to capture the life of Barry Seal, a one-time airline pilot who winds up being one of Pablo Escobar's biggest aides in delivering cocaine into the United States. Eventually, Seal is caught by the DEA and in order to stave off serious jail time, he identifies Pablo Escobar as the leader of the Medellin cartel. He eventually goes on to provide the first ever photographic evidence of Escobar.

It culminates in Seal's assassination by the Medellin Cartel which occurs after the DEA goes back on a plea deal. The judge sentences Seal to community service and declines to accept the conditions Seal needed (notably that since his life was in danger, he needed freedom of movement). Seal reports to his court mandated community service where gunmen are waiting for him, and he is shot dead.

== Cast ==
- Dennis Hopper as Barry Seal
- Robert Carradine as Dave Booker
- Richard Jenkins as Jim Donaldson
- Adrienne Barbeau as Debbie Seal
- Don Hood as Tony
- G. W. Bailey as Camp
- Danny Trejo as Lito
- Salvador Levy
- Danny Kamin as Lieutenant Alvey
- John McConnell
- Eliott Keener
- Ed Amatrudo as Ochoa
- Jerry Leggio as Judge Altzo
- Brooks Read as Judge Courier
- Kevin Quigley as Regent
- John Wilmot as Biggs
- Richard Folmer as Blomquist
- Edward Edwards as Oliver North
- Thomas Uskali as Wright
- James Borders as Coulter
- Luigi Rivera as Gacha
- William Agosto as Vaughn
- Casey Sander as Ron Caffrey
- Jim Gleason as Scott
- David Dahlgren as Pilot
- Dennis Platt as Saunders

== See also ==
- List of American films of 1991
