= The Ville (video game) =

2012 video game

- Developer: Zynga
- Release: June 30, 2012
- Genre: social simulation
- Mode: multiplayer

The Ville is a defunct game by Zynga released on June 30, 2012, in which the object was to earn experience points by building a house and talking with neighbors.

The game depended on energy, coins, and cash like many other Zynga games, but it also depended on happiness. Happiness could be earned by talking to neighbors.

== Lawsuit ==
On August 3, 2012, EA sued Zynga, claiming that The Ville infringed on the copyright of The Sims Social. EA publicly stated that "Maxis isn't the first studio to claim that Zynga copied its creative product. But we are the studio that has the financial and corporate resources to stand up and do something about it." EA added that the lawsuit was not just to uphold their copyright, but "for creative teams who feel that their hard work and imaginations have been ripped off". Zynga responded that EA misunderstood copyright law, and that it's "ironic that EA brings this suit shortly after launching SimCity Social which bears an uncanny resemblance to Zynga's CityVille game." Zynga's essential defense was that none of the similarities between the games were copyrightable, since they are standard ideas from the life simulation game genre. Zynga responded with a counterclaim, suing EA for establishing an allegedly illegal no-hire agreement, to prevent Zynga from poaching their employees.

This dispute began after the ruling in Tetris Holding, LLC v. Xio Interactive, Inc., where a court determined there was copyright protection in certain Tetris game elements that were copied heavily by a competitor. By September, a judge denied a motion to dismiss another copyright case, Spry Fox, LLC v. Lolapps, Inc., finding that there were enough similarities in copyrightable elements to proceed to trial. Writing for Forbes, Eric Goldman noted that "Zynga probably did less to modify its UI than [Lolapps] did," and "[this] ruling suggests that Zynga probably can't score a quick win." Intellectual property expert Jack Schechter concluded that courts were increasingly willing to protect games from would-be clones, and suggested that Zynga would not be happy with the outcome in Spry Fox. Law professor applied the Spry Fox case to EA's dispute with Zynga, and speculated that a similar analysis would lead to a ruling in EA's favor. However, Goldman added that "both EA and Zynga potentially have a lot to lose from letting their case proceed", as a judge could rule that some parts of EA's game are not copyrightable, just as in the Spry Fox case.

EA and Zynga reached a settlement in February 2013, the terms of which were not made public. Both EA's claim and Zynga's counterclaim were dismissed.

== Closure ==
It was announced on April 24, 2013 that the game would shut down on June 24, 2013, 10 days after its rival EA game, The Sims Social shut down.
