= Dennis Hopper =

American actor and filmmaker (1936–2010)

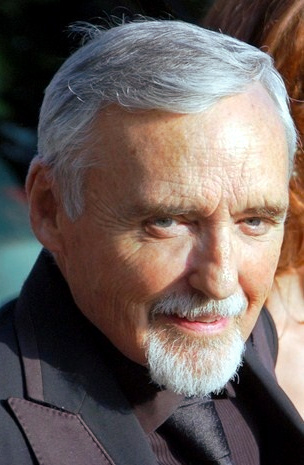
- Hopper in 2008
- Born: Dennis Lee Hopper; May 17, 1936; Dodge City, Kansas, U.S.
- Died: May 29, 2010 (aged 74); Venice, California, U.S.
- Burial place: Jesús Nazareno Cemetery, Ranchos de Taos, New Mexico, U.S.
- Education: Actors Studio
- Occupations: Actor; film director; photographer; visual artist
- Years active: 1954–2010
- Works: Filmography
- Spouses: Brooke Hayward (m. 1961; div. 1969) Michelle Phillips (m. 1970; div. 1970) Daria Halprin (m. 1972; div. 1976) Katherine LaNasa (m. 1989; div. 1992) Victoria Duffy (m. 1996; sep. 2010)
- Children: 4, including Ruthanna Hopper

Dennis Lee Hopper (May 17, 1936 – May 29, 2010) was an American actor, filmmaker, photographer and visual artist. He is considered one of the key figures of the New Hollywood era. He earned prizes from the Cannes Film Festival and Venice International Film Festival as well as nominations for two Academy Awards, a Primetime Emmy Award and two Golden Globe Awards.

Hopper studied acting at the Old Globe Theatre in San Diego and the Actors Studio in New York. He made his first television appearance in 1954, and soon after appeared in two of the films that made James Dean famous, Rebel Without a Cause (1955) and Giant (1956). He then played supporting roles in films such as Gunfight at the O.K. Corral (1957), The Sons of Katie Elder (1965), Cool Hand Luke (1967), Hang 'Em High (1968) and True Grit (1969). Hopper made his directorial film debut with Easy Rider (1969), which he and co-star Peter Fonda wrote with Terry Southern. The film earned Hopper a Cannes Film Festival Award for Best Debut, and an Academy Award nomination for Best Original Screenplay. He also began a prolific and acclaimed photography career in the 1960s.

He became frequently typecast as mentally disturbed outsiders and rebels in such films as Mad Dog Morgan (1976), The American Friend (1977), Apocalypse Now (1979), Rumble Fish (1983), and Blue Velvet (1986). He received an Academy Award for Best Supporting Actor nomination for his role in Hoosiers (1986). His later film roles included True Romance (1993), Speed (1994), Waterworld (1995) and Elegy (2009). He appeared posthumously in the long-delayed The Other Side of the Wind (2018), which had previously been filmed in the early 1970s.

Other directorial credits for Hopper include The Last Movie (1971), Out of the Blue (1980), Colors (1988), and The Hot Spot (1990). He received Primetime Emmy Award for Outstanding Lead Actor in a Limited Series or Movie nomination for his role in Paris Trout (1991). His other television roles include in the HBO film Doublecrossed (1991), 24 (2002), the NBC series E-Ring (2005–2006), and the Starz series Crash (2008–2009).

== Early life and education ==
Dennis Lee Hopper was born on May 17, 1936, in Dodge City, Kansas, to Marjorie Mae (née Davis; July 12, 1917 – January 12, 2007) and Jay Millard Hopper (June 23, 1916 – August 7, 1982). He had Scottish ancestors. Hopper had two younger brothers, Marvin and David.

After World War II, the family moved to Kansas City, Missouri, where the young Hopper attended Saturday art classes at the Kansas City Art Institute. When he was 13, Hopper and his family moved to San Diego, where his mother worked as a lifeguard instructor and his father was a post office manager, having previously served in the Office of Strategic Services, the precursor to the Central Intelligence Agency, in World War II in the China Burma India Theater. Hopper was voted most likely to succeed at Helix High School, where he was active in the drama club, speech and choir. It was there that he developed an interest in acting, studying at the Old Globe Theatre in San Diego, and the Actors Studio in New York City (he studied with Lee Strasberg for five years). Hopper struck up a friendship with actor Vincent Price, whose passion for art influenced Hopper's interest in art. He was especially fond of the plays of William Shakespeare.

== Career ==
=== 1954–1966: Early roles ===
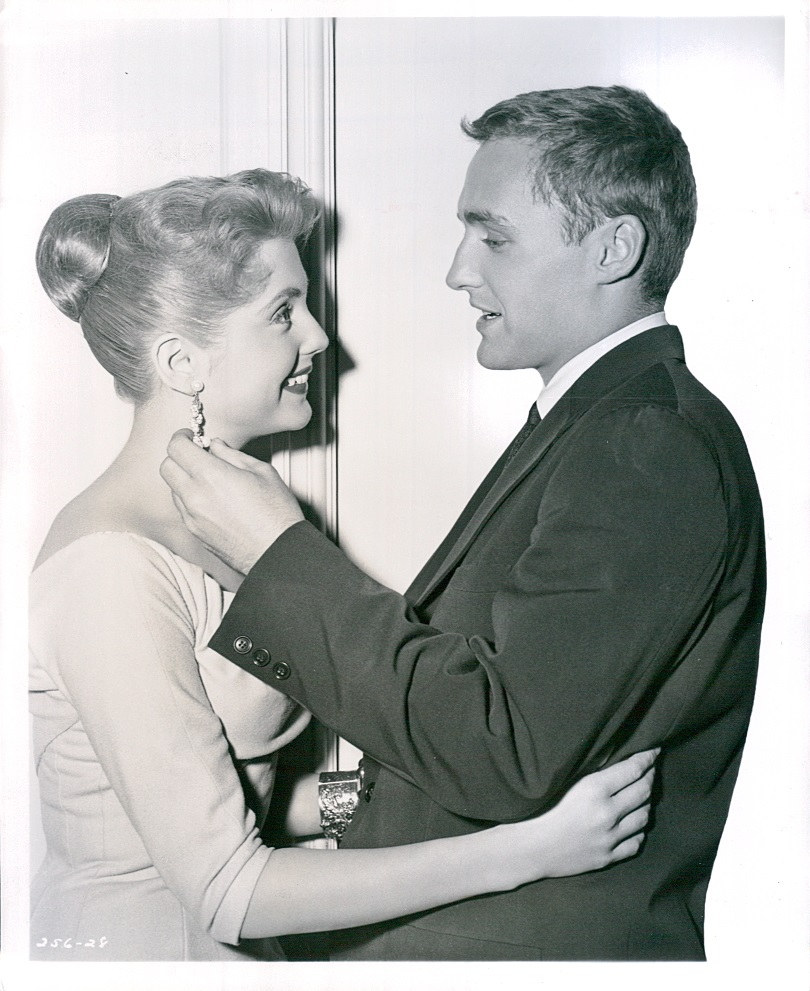
Hopper, aged 20, with actress Karen Sharpe in an April 1957 promotional photograph for an episode of the ABC television series Conflict

Hopper was reported to have had an uncredited role in Johnny Guitar in 1954, but he was quoted as saying he was not in Hollywood when the film was made. Hopper made his debut on film in two roles with James Dean (whom he admired immensely) in Rebel Without a Cause (1955) and Giant (1956). Dean's death in a car accident in September 1955 affected the young Hopper deeply and it was shortly afterward that he got into a confrontation with veteran director Henry Hathaway on the film From Hell to Texas (1958). Hopper reportedly forced Hathaway to shoot more than 80 takes of a scene over several days before he acquiesced to Hathaway's direction. After filming was finally completed, Hathaway allegedly told Hopper that his career in Hollywood was finished.

In his book Last Train to Memphis, American popular music historian Peter Guralnick says that in 1956, when Elvis Presley was making his first film in Hollywood, Hopper was roommates with fellow actor Nick Adams and the three became friends and socialized together. In 1959, Hopper moved to New York to study Method acting under Lee Strasberg at the Actors Studio. In 1961, Hopper played his first lead role in Night Tide, an atmospheric supernatural thriller involving a mermaid in an amusement park. In a December 1994 interview on the Charlie Rose Show, Hopper credited John Wayne with saving his career, as Hopper acknowledged that because of his insolent behavior, he could not find work in Hollywood for seven years. Hopper stated that, because of his marriage to Brooke Hayward, he was the son-in-law of actress Margaret Sullavan, a friend of John Wayne, and Wayne hired Hopper for a role in The Sons of Katie Elder (1965), also directed by Hathaway, which enabled Hopper to restart his film career.

Hopper debuted in an episode of the Richard Boone television series Medic in 1955, portraying a young epileptic. He appeared in the first episode of the TV series The Rifleman (1958–1963) as the troubled orphan protagonist Vernon Tippet who is exploited by his greedy uncle. The series starred Chuck Connors and the premiere episode "The Sharpshooter" was written by Sam Peckinpah. Hopper subsequently appeared in over 140 episodes of television shows such as Gunsmoke, Bonanza, Petticoat Junction, The Twilight Zone, The Barbara Stanwyck Show, The Defenders, The Investigators, The Legend of Jesse James, Entourage, The Big Valley, The Time Tunnel, and Combat!.

=== 1967–1986: Breakthrough and acclaim ===
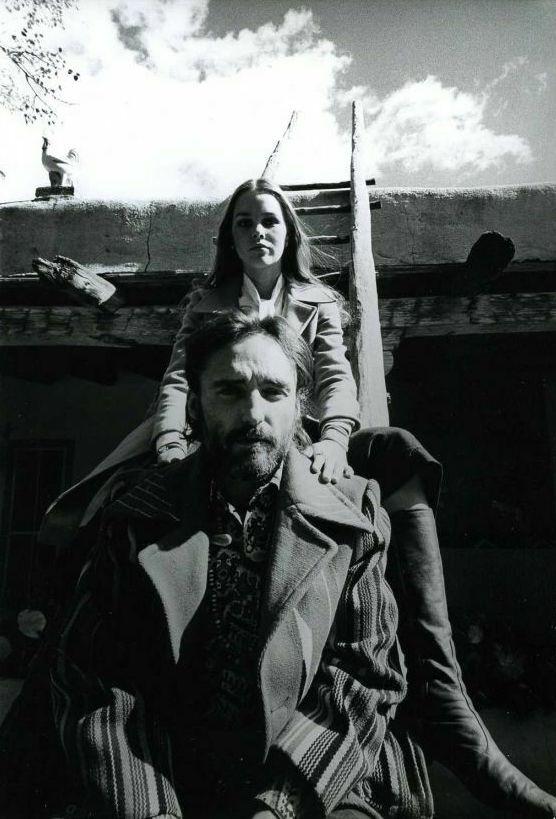
Hopper with second wife Michelle Phillips in 1970, during editing of The Last Movie

Hopper had a supporting role as the bet-taker, "Babalugats", in Cool Hand Luke (1967). In 1968, Hopper teamed with Peter Fonda, Terry Southern and Jack Nicholson to make Easy Rider, which premiered in July 1969. With the release of True Grit a month earlier, Hopper had starring roles in two major box-office films that summer. Hopper won wide acclaim as the director for his improvisational methods and innovative editing for Easy Rider. The production was plagued by creative differences and personal acrimony between Fonda and Hopper, the dissolution of Hopper's marriage to Brooke Hayward, his unwillingness to leave the editor's desk and his accelerating abuse of drugs and alcohol. Hopper said of Easy Rider: "The cocaine problem in the United States is really because of me. There was no cocaine before Easy Rider on the street. After Easy Rider, it was everywhere".

Besides showing drug use on film, it was one of the first films to portray the hippie lifestyle. Hopper became a role model for some male youths who rejected traditional jobs and traditional American culture, partly exemplified by Fonda's long sideburns and Hopper wearing shoulder-length hair and a long mustache. They were denied rooms in motels and proper service in restaurants as a result of their radical looks. Their long hair became a point of contention in various scenes during the film. Journalist Ann Hornaday wrote: "With its portrait of counterculture heroes raising their middle fingers to the uptight middle-class hypocrisies, Easy Rider became the cinematic symbol of the 1960s, a celluloid anthem to freedom, macho bravado and anti-establishment rebellion". Film critic Matthew Hays wrote "no other persona better signifies the lost idealism of the 1960s than that of Dennis Hopper".

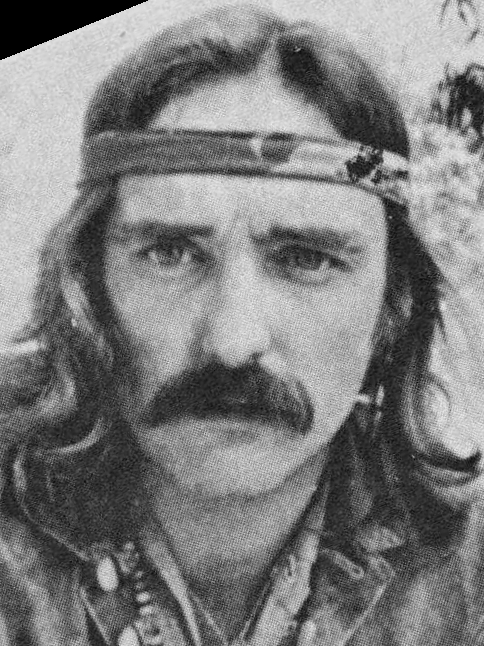
Hopper in 1973

Hopper was unable to capitalize on his Easy Rider success for several years. In 1970 he filmed The Last Movie, cowritten by Stewart Stern and photographed by László Kovács in Peru, and completed production in 1971. It won the prestigious CIDALC Award at that year's Venice Film Festival, but Universal Studios leaders expected a blockbuster like Easy Rider, and did not like the film or give it an enthusiastic release, while American film audiences found it confounding – as convoluted as an abstract painting. On viewing the first release print, fresh from the lab, in his screening room at Universal, MCA founder Jules C. Stein rose from his chair and said, "I just don't understand this younger generation." During the tumultuous editing process, Hopper ensconced himself at the Mabel Dodge Luhan House in Taos, New Mexico, which he had purchased in 1970, for almost an entire year. In between contesting Fonda's rights to the majority of the residual profits from Easy Rider, he married singer Michelle Phillips of The Mamas and the Papas on Halloween of 1970. The marriage lasted eight days.

Hopper acted in another John Wayne film, True Grit (1969), and during its production, he became well acquainted with Wayne. In both of the films with Wayne, Hopper's character is killed in the presence of Wayne's character, to whom he utters his dying words. On September 30, 1970, Hopper appeared on the second episode of season 2 of The Johnny Cash Show where he sang a duet with Cash entitled "Goin' Up Goin' Down". Cash said the song was written by Kris Kristofferson about Hopper. Hopper added that Kristofferson had written some songs for his Peruvian-shot movie The Last Movie, in which Kristofferson appeared in his debut role with Julie Adams. Hopper also recited Rudyard Kipling's famous poem If— during his appearance. Hopper was able to sustain his lifestyle and a measure of celebrity by acting in numerous low budget and European films throughout the 1970s as the archetypal "tormented maniac", including Mad Dog Morgan (1976), Tracks (1976), and The American Friend (1977). With Francis Ford Coppola's blockbuster Apocalypse Now (1979), Hopper returned to prominence as a hyper-manic Vietnam-era photojournalist. Stepping in for an overwhelmed director, Hopper won praise in 1980 for his directing and acting in Out of the Blue. Immediately thereafter, Hopper starred as an addled short-order cook "Cracker" in the Neil Young/Dean Stockwell low-budget collaboration Human Highway. Production was reportedly often delayed by his unreliable behavior. Peter Biskind states in the New Hollywood history Easy Riders, Raging Bulls that Hopper's cocaine intake had reached three grams a day by this time, complemented by 30 beers, and some marijuana and Cuba libres.

After staging a "suicide attempt" (really more of a daredevil act) in a coffin using 17 sticks of dynamite during an "art happening" at the Rice University Media Center (filmed by professor and documentary filmmaker Brian Huberman), and later disappearing into the Mexican desert during a particularly extravagant bender, Hopper entered a drug rehabilitation program in 1983.

Though Hopper gave critically acclaimed performances in Coppola's Rumble Fish (1983) and Sam Peckinpah's The Osterman Weekend (1983), it was not until he portrayed the gas-huffing, obscenity-screaming villain Frank Booth in David Lynch's Blue Velvet (1986) that his career truly revived. On reading the script Hopper said to Lynch: "You have to let me play Frank Booth. Because I am Frank Booth!" He won critical acclaim and several awards for this role, and in the same year received an Oscar nomination for Best Supporting Actor for his role as an alcoholic assistant basketball coach in Hoosiers. Also in 1986, Hopper portrayed Lt. Enright in the comedy horror The Texas Chainsaw Massacre 2.

=== 1987–2010: Later work and final roles ===
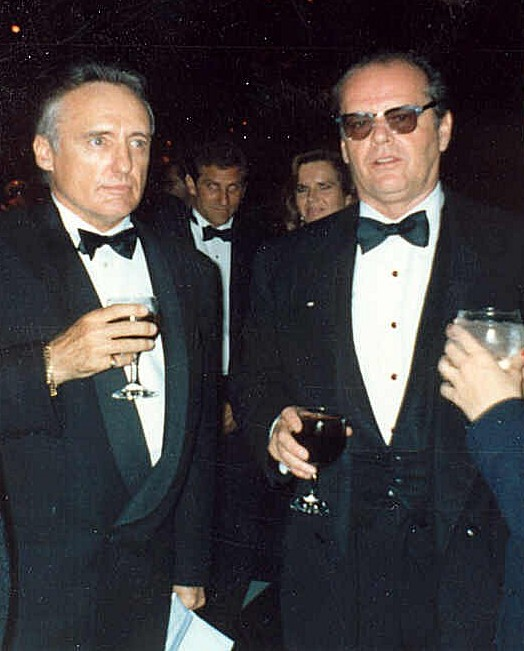
Hopper (left) with his friend and Easy Rider co-star Jack Nicholson in 1990

In 1987 he acted in the neo-noir thriller Black Widow alongside Debra Winger, the action comedy Straight to Hell, the adventure film Running Out of Luck starring Mick Jagger and the romantic comedy The Pick-up Artist starring Molly Ringwald and Robert Downey Jr. In 1988, he directed Colors, a critically acclaimed police procedural about gang violence in Los Angeles starring Sean Penn and Robert Duvall. Hopper plays an aging hippie prankster in the 1990 comedy Flashback, fleeing in a Furthur-like old bus to the tune of Steppenwolf's "Born to Be Wild". Hopper teamed with Nike in the early 1990s to make a series of television commercials. He appeared as a "crazed referee" in those ads. Hopper appeared on the final two episodes of the cult 1991 television show Fishing with John with host John Lurie. He was nominated for the Primetime Emmy Award for Outstanding Lead Actor in a Limited or Anthology Series or Movie for the 1991 HBO film Paris Trout. Shortly thereafter, he played drug smuggler and DEA informant Barry Seal in the HBO film Doublecrossed.

He starred as King Koopa in Super Mario Bros., a 1993 critical and commercial failure loosely based on the video game of the same name, although the film and his role would eventually find a cult following. In 1993, he played Clifford Worley in True Romance. He co-starred in the 1994 blockbuster Speed with Keanu Reeves and Sandra Bullock, and as magic-phobic H.P. Lovecraft in the television movie Witch Hunt. In 1995, Hopper played a greedy television self-help guru, Dr. Luther Waxling in Search and Destroy. The same year, he starred as Deacon, the one-eyed nemesis of Kevin Costner in Waterworld. And in 1996 he starred in the science fiction comedy Space Truckers directed by Stuart Gordon. Also in 1996 he appeared as art dealer Bruno Bischofberger in Basquiat. Hopper was originally cast as Christof in the 1998 Peter Weir film, The Truman Show, but left during the filming due to "creative differences"; he was replaced by Ed Harris. In 1999, he starred in The Prophet's Game (a dark thriller), directed by David Worth and also starring Stephanie Zimbalist, Robert Yocum, Sondra Locke, Joe Penny and Tracey Birdsall. In 2003, Hopper was in the running for the dual lead in the indie horror drama Firecracker, but was ousted at the last minute in favor of Mike Patton.

In 2005, Hopper played Paul Kaufman in George A. Romero's Land of the Dead. He portrayed villain Victor Drazen in the first season of the action drama 24. Hopper starred as a U.S. Army colonel in the 2005 television series E-Ring, a drama set at The Pentagon, but the series was canceled after 14 episodes aired. Hopper appeared in all 22 episodes that were filmed. He also played the part of record producer Ben Cendars in the Starz television series Crash, which lasted two seasons (26 episodes).

In 2008, Hopper starred in An American Carol. In 2008 he also played The Death in Wim Wenders' Palermo Shooting. His last major feature film appearance was in the 2008 film Elegy with Ben Kingsley, Penélope Cruz and Debbie Harry. For his last performance, he was the voice of Tony, the alpha-male of the Eastern wolf pack in the 2010 animated film Alpha and Omega. He died before the movie was released. This brought the directors to dedicate the film to his memory at the beginning of the movie credits. Hopper filmed scenes for The Other Side of the Wind in 1971, appearing as himself; after decades of legal, financial and technical delays, the film was finally released on Netflix in 2018.

== Photography and art ==
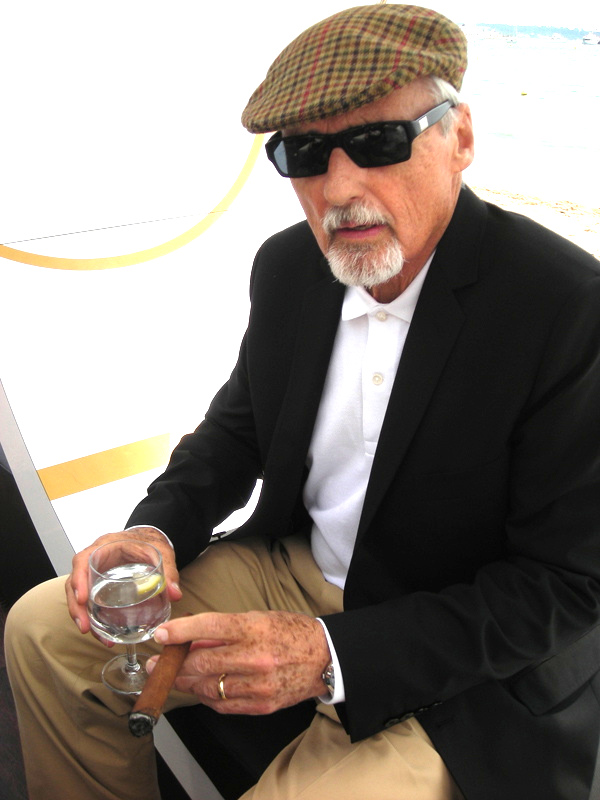
Hopper in June 2008

Hopper had several artistic pursuits beyond film. He was a prolific photographer, painter, and sculptor.

Hopper's fascination with art began with painting lessons at the Nelson-Atkins Museum while still a child in Kansas City, Missouri. Early in his career, he painted and wrote poetry, though many of his works were destroyed in the 1961 Bel Air Fire, which burned hundreds of homes, including his and his wife's, on Stone Canyon Road in Bel Air. His painting style ranges from abstract impressionism to photorealism and often includes references to his cinematic work and to other artists.

Ostracized by the Hollywood film studios due to his reputation for being a "difficult" actor, Hopper turned to photography in 1961 with a camera bought for him by his first wife Brooke Hayward. During this period he created the cover art for the Ike & Tina Turner album River Deep – Mountain High (released in 1966). He became a prolific photographer, and noted writer Terry Southern profiled Hopper in Better Homes and Gardens as an up-and-coming photographer "to watch" in the mid-1960s. Hopper's early photography is known for portraits from the 1960s, and he began shooting portraits for Vogue and other magazines. His photographs of Martin Luther King, Jr.'s 1963 March on Washington and the 1965 civil-rights march in Selma, Alabama, were published. His intimate and unguarded images of Andy Warhol, Jane Fonda, The Byrds, Paul Newman, Jasper Johns, Claes Oldenburg, Robert Rauschenberg, James Brown, Peter Fonda, Ed Ruscha, the Grateful Dead, Michael McClure, and Timothy Leary, among others, became the subject of gallery and museum shows and were collected in several books, including 1712 North Crescent Heights. The book, whose title refers to the house where he lived with Hayward in the Hollywood Hills in the 1960s, was edited by his daughter Marin Hopper. From 1960 to 1967, before the making of Easy Rider, Hopper created 18,000 images that chronicled the remarkable artists, musicians, actors, places, happenings, demonstrations, and concerts of that period. Dennis Hopper: Photographs 1961–1967 was published in February 2011, by Taschen. German film director Wim Wenders said of Hopper that if "he'd only been a photographer, he'd be one of the great photographers of the twentieth century." In The New Yorker, Hopper, as photographer, was described as "a compelling, important, and weirdly omnipresent chronicler of his times."

Hopper began working as a painter and a poet as well as a collector of art in the 1960s as well, particularly Pop Art. Over his lifetime he amassed a formidable array of 20th- and 21st-century art, including many of Julian Schnabel's works (such as a shattered-plate portrait of Hopper); numerous works from his early cohorts, such as Ed Ruscha, Edward Kienholz, Roy Lichtenstein (Sinking Sun, 1964), and Warhol (Double Mona Lisa, 1963); and pieces by contemporary artists such as Damien Hirst and Robin Rhode. He was involved in L.A.'s Ferus and Virginia Dwan galleries in the 1960s, and he was a longtime friend and supporter to New York dealer Tony Shafrazi. One of the first art works Hopper owned was an early print of Andy Warhol's Campbell's Soup Cans bought for US$75. Hopper also once owned Warhol's Mao, which he shot one evening in a fit of paranoia, the two bullet holes possibly adding to the print's value. The print sold at Christie's, New York, for US$302,500 in January 2011.

During his lifetime, Hopper's own work as well as his collection was shown in monographic and group exhibitions around the world including the Corcoran Gallery of Art, Washington D.C.; Walker Art Center, Minneapolis, Minnesota; the Stedelijk Museum, Amsterdam; the State Hermitage Museum, St. Petersburg; MAK Vienna: Austrian Museum of Applied Arts/Contemporary Art, Vienna; the Whitney Museum of American Art, New York; and the Cinémathèque Française, Paris, and the Australian Centre for the Moving Image, Melbourne. In March 2010, it was announced that Hopper was on the "short list" for Jeffrey Deitch's inaugural show at the Museum of Contemporary Art, Los Angeles (MOCA). In April 2010, Deitch confirmed that Hopper's work, curated by Julian Schnabel, will indeed be the focus of his debut at MOCA. The title of the exhibition, Double Standard, was taken from Hopper's iconic 1961 photograph of the two Standard Oil signs seen through an automobile windshield at the intersection of Santa Monica Boulevard, Melrose Avenue, and North Doheny Drive on historic Route 66 in Los Angeles. The image was reproduced on the invitation for Ed Ruscha's second solo exhibition at Ferus Gallery in 1964.

In 2011, Barricade Books published film historian Peter L. Winkler's biography, Dennis Hopper: The Wild Ride of a Hollywood Rebel. In 2013, HarperCollins published Hopper: A Journey into the American Dream, a biography by American writer Tom Folsom.

On the Gorillaz album Demon Days, Hopper narrates the song "Fire Coming Out of the Monkey's Head". Gorillaz lead musician and songwriter Damon Albarn revisited recordings of Hopper's narration 20 years later. He incorporated unused takes in the title track of the 2026 album The Mountain. Albarn wrote the album as a reflection on death and used the vocals as a way to remember and honor collaborators, such as Hopper, who have died.

Hopper is also the subject of The Waterboys album released on 4 April 2025 titled Life, Death and Dennis Hopper. Written by singer songwriter Mike Scott, the album contains twenty five compositions dedicated to the actor and includes contributions from Bruce Springsteen, Fiona Apple, and Steve Earle amongst others.

In the late 1980s, Hopper purchased a trio of nearly identical two-story, loft-style condominiums at 330 Indiana Avenue in Venice Beach, California – one made of concrete, one of plywood, and one of green roofing shingles – built by Frank Gehry and two artist friends of Hopper's, Chuck Arnoldi and Laddie John Dill, in 1981. In 1987, he commissioned an industrial-style main residence, with a corrugated metal exterior designed by Brian Murphy, as a place to display his artwork.

== Personal life ==
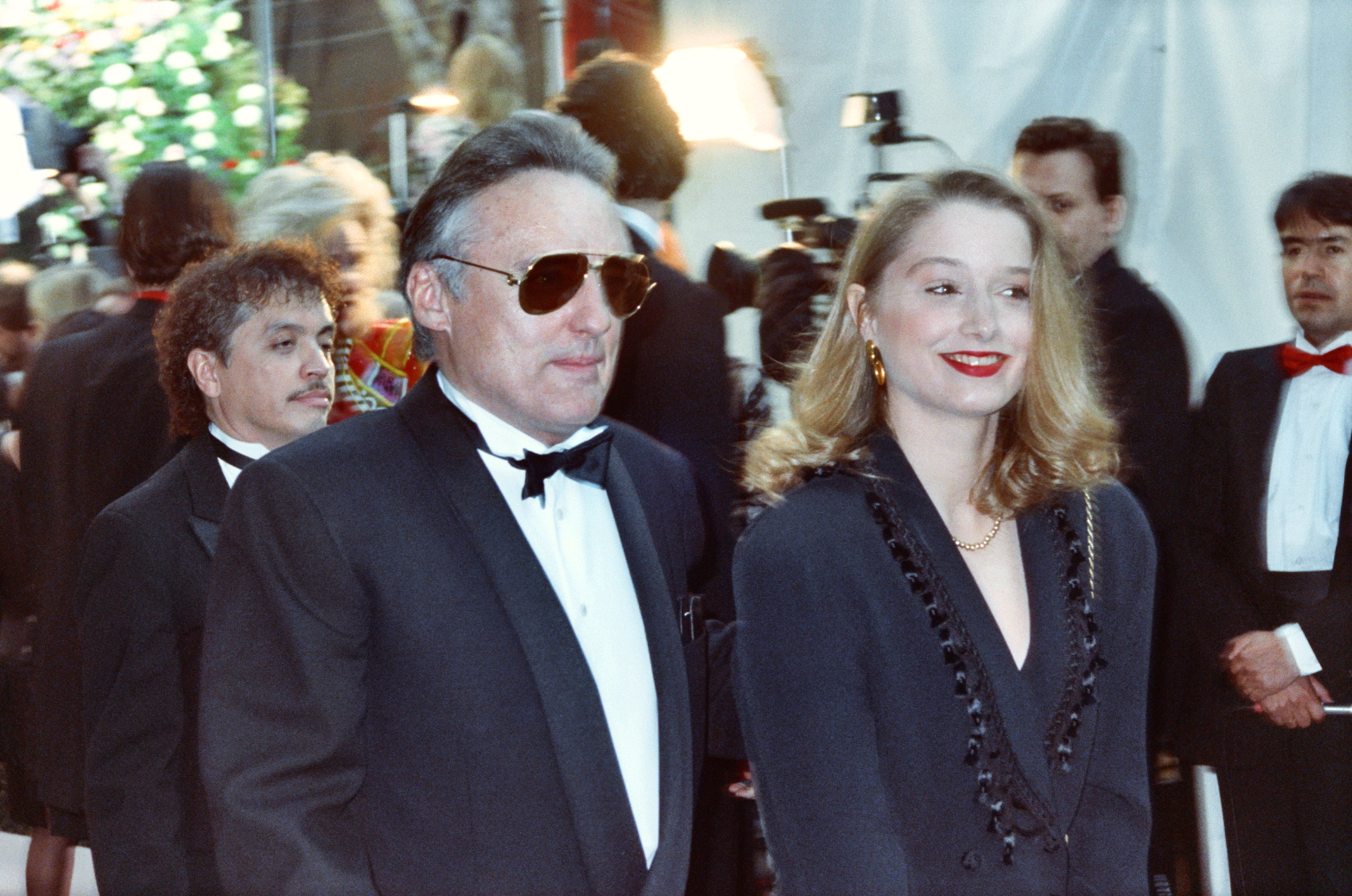
Hopper with Katherine LaNasa, his fourth wife, at the 62nd Academy Awards in 1990

According to Rolling Stone magazine, Hopper was "one of Hollywood's most notorious drug addicts" for 20 years. He spent much of the 1970s and early 1980s living as an "outcast" in Taos, New Mexico, after the success of Easy Rider. Hopper was also "notorious for his troubled relationships with women", including Michelle Phillips, who divorced him after eight days of marriage. Hopper was married five times:

- Brooke Hayward, married 1961 – divorced 1969, one daughter, Marin Brooke Hopper
- Michelle Phillips, married October 31, 1970 – divorced November 8, 1970
- Daria Halprin, married 1972 – divorced 1976, one daughter, Ruthanna Hopper
- Katherine LaNasa, married June 17, 1989 – divorced April 1992, one son
- Victoria Duffy, married April 13, 1996 – separated January 12, 2010, one daughter

Hopper has been widely reported to be the godfather of actress Amber Tamblyn; in a 2009 interview with Parade, Tamblyn explained that "godfather" was "just a loose term" for Hopper, Dean Stockwell and Neil Young, three famous friends of her father Russ Tamblyn, who were always around the house when she was growing up, and who were big influences on her life.

Hopper was a longtime friend of actress Sally Kirkland, who admitted in a 2021 Reelz documentary that they had a one-night stand early on in their friendship.

In 1994, Rip Torn filed a defamation lawsuit against Hopper over a story Hopper told on The Tonight Show with Jay Leno. Hopper claimed that Torn pulled a knife on him during pre-production of the film Easy Rider. According to Hopper, Torn was originally cast in the film but was replaced with Jack Nicholson after the incident. According to Torn's suit, it was actually Hopper who pulled the knife on him. A judge ruled in Torn's favor and Hopper was ordered to pay US$475,000 in damages. Hopper then appealed but the judge again ruled in Torn's favor and Hopper was required to pay another US$475,000 in punitive damages.

According to Newsmeat, Hopper donated US$2,000 to the Republican National Committee in 2004 and an equal amount in 2005. Hopper donated $600 to Irish political party Sinn Féin. Despite being a Republican, Hopper supported Barack Obama in the 2008 presidential election. Hopper confirmed this in an election day appearance on the ABC daytime show The View. He said his reason for not voting Republican was the selection of Sarah Palin as the Republican vice presidential candidate.

In 2008, Hopper was honored with the rank of commander of France's National Order of Arts and Letters, at a ceremony in Paris.

=== Divorce from Victoria Duffy ===
On January 14, 2010, Hopper filed for divorce from his fifth wife Victoria Duffy. After citing her "outrageous conduct" and stating she was "insane", "inhuman" and "volatile", Hopper was granted a restraining order against her on February 11, and as a result, she was forbidden to come within 10 feet (3 m) of him or contact him. On March 9, Duffy refused to move out of the Hopper home, despite the court's order that she do so by March 15.

On April 5, a court ruled that Duffy could continue living on Hopper's property, and that he must pay US$12,000 per month spousal and child support for their daughter Galen. Hopper did not attend the hearing. On May 12, a hearing was held before Judge Amy Pellman in downtown Los Angeles Superior Court. Though Hopper died two weeks later, Duffy insisted at the hearing that he was well enough to be deposed. The hearing also dealt with who would be the beneficiary on Hopper's life insurance policy, which listed his wife as a beneficiary. A very ill Hopper did not appear in court though his estranged wife did. Despite Duffy's bid to be named the sole beneficiary of Hopper's million-dollar policy, the judge ruled against her and limited her claim to one-quarter of the policy. The remaining US$750,000 was to go to his estate.

== Illness and death ==
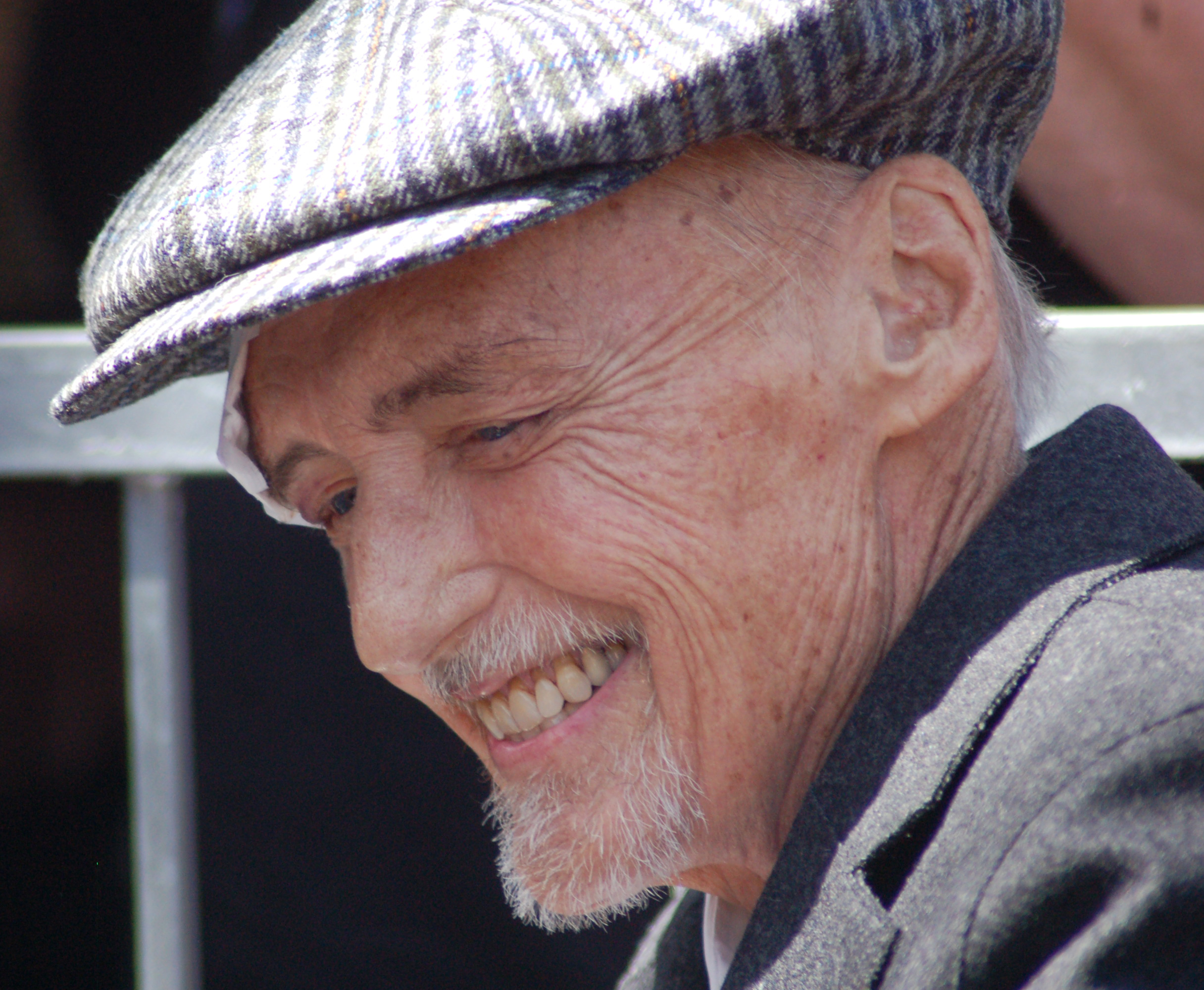
Hopper at a ceremony to receive a star on the Hollywood Walk of Fame on March 26, 2010, two months before his death

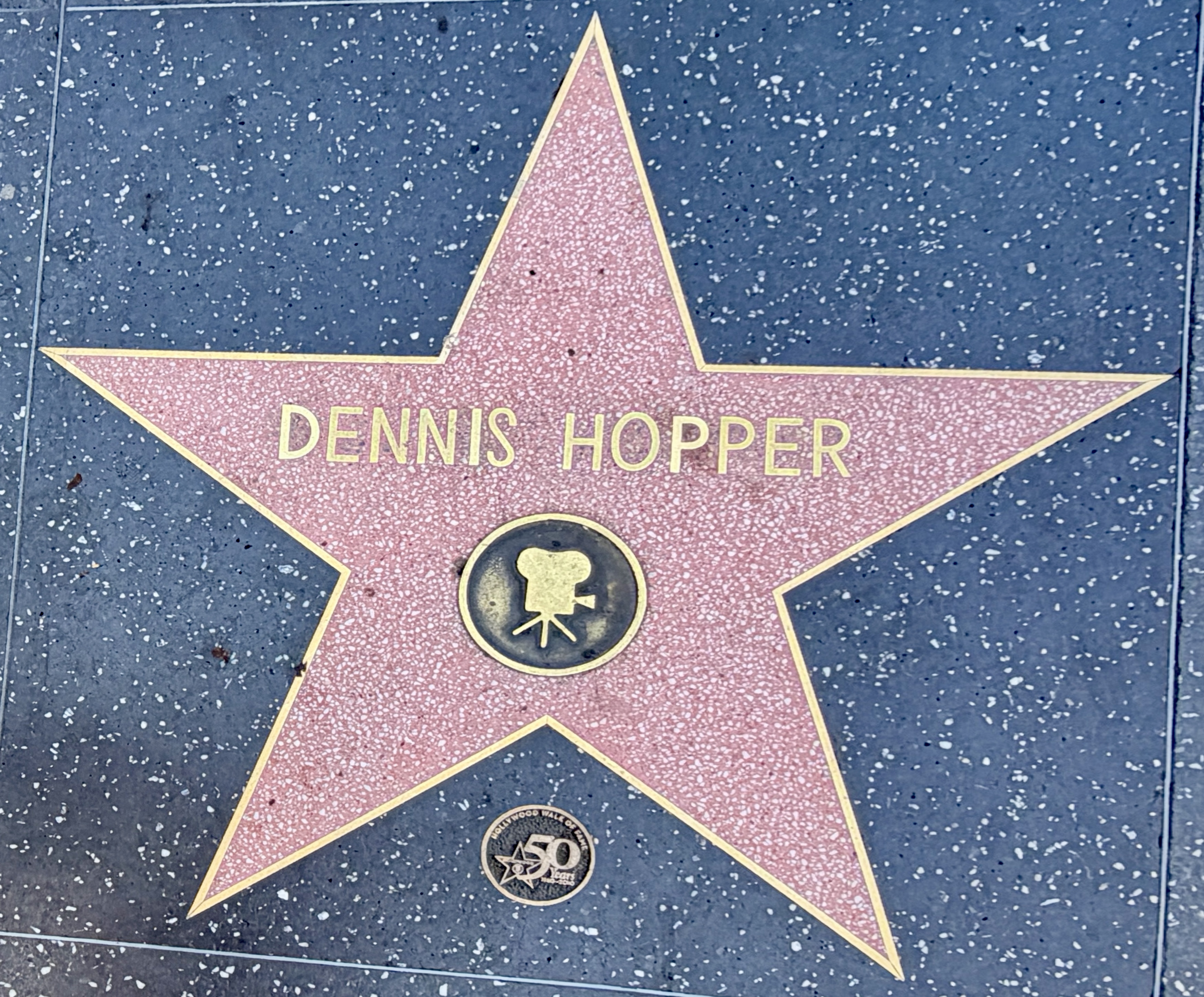
Hollywood Walk of Fame star

On September 28, 2009, Hopper, then 73, was reportedly taken by ambulance to an unidentified Manhattan hospital wearing an oxygen mask and "with numerous tubes visible". On October 2, he was discharged after receiving treatment for dehydration.

On October 29, 2009, Hopper's manager Sam Maydew reported that he had been diagnosed with advanced prostate cancer. In January 2010, it was reported that Hopper's cancer had metastasized to his bones.

On March 18, 2010, he was honored with the 2,403rd star on the Hollywood Walk of Fame in front of Grauman's Egyptian Theatre on Hollywood Boulevard. Surrounded by family, fans, and friends—including Jack Nicholson, Viggo Mortensen, David Lynch, and Michael Madsen—he attended its addition to the sidewalk six days later.

By March 2010, Hopper reportedly weighed only 100 pounds (45 kg) and was unable to carry on long conversations. According to papers filed in his divorce court case, Hopper was terminally ill and was unable to undergo chemotherapy to treat his prostate cancer.

Hopper died at his home in the coastal Venice district of Los Angeles, on May 29, 2010, at age 74. His funeral took place on June 3, 2010, at San Francisco de Asis Mission Church in Ranchos de Taos, New Mexico. His body was buried at the Jesus Nazareno Cemetery in Ranchos de Taos.

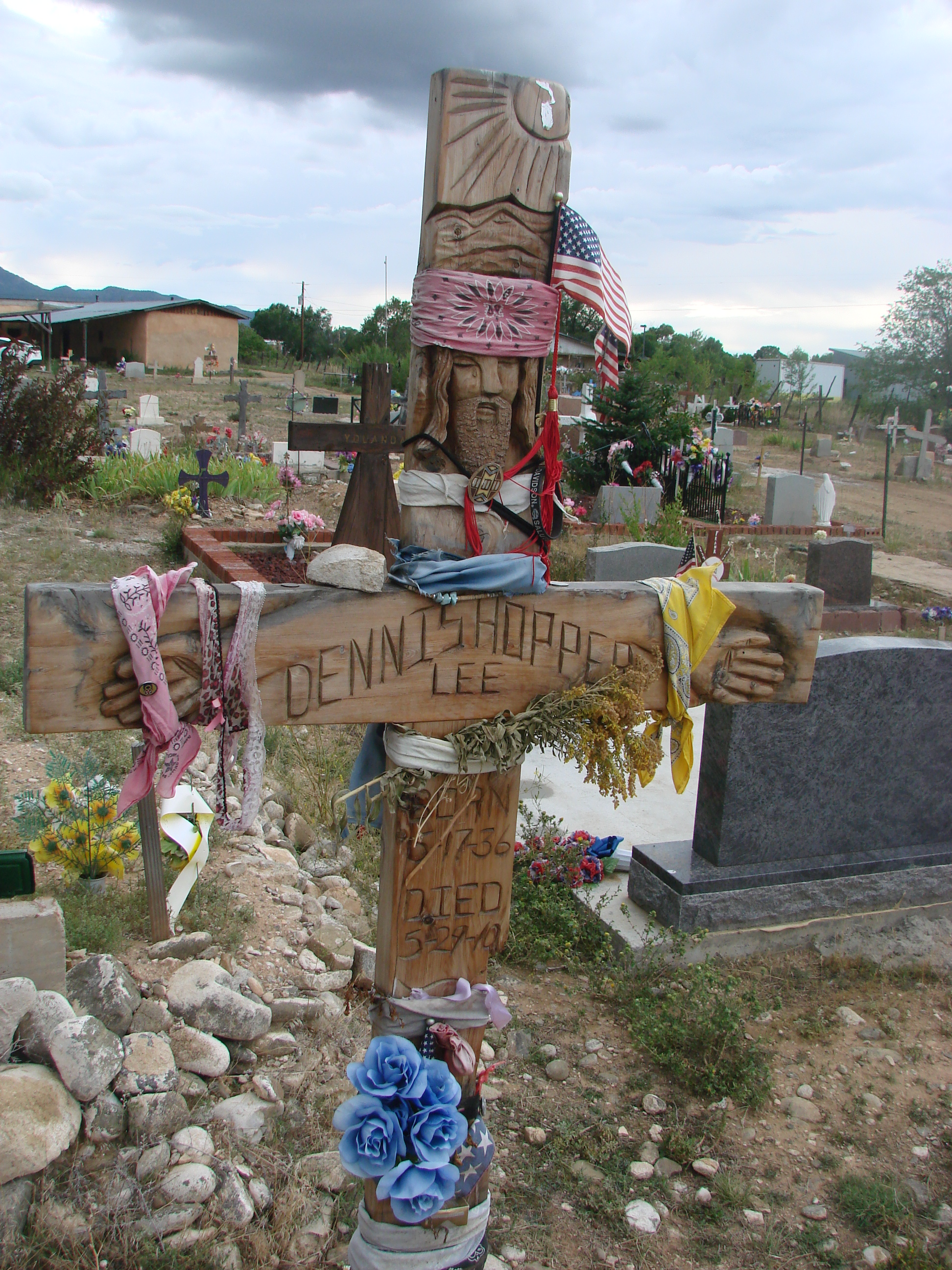
Hopper's grave in Ranchos de Taos, New Mexico

The film Alpha and Omega, which was among his last film roles, was dedicated to him, as was the 2011 film Restless, which starred his son Henry Hopper. Virtual band Gorillaz, whom Hopper collaborated with, paid tribute to Hopper during their headlining set at Glastonbury.

== Other works ==
=== Books ===
- Dennis Hopper: Out of the Sixties, Twelvetrees Press (1986)
- Dennis Hopper: Flashback (1990)
- 1712 North Crescent Heights, Greybull Press (2001)
- Dennis Hopper: A System of Moments, Hartje Cantz (2001)
- Dennis Hopper: Photographs, 1961–1967, Taschen (2009)
- Dennis Hopper & the New Hollywood, Rizzoli International Publications (2009)
- Dennis Hopper: The Lost Album, Prestel Verlag (2014)
- Dennis Hopper: Drugstore Camera, Damiani (2015)
- Dennis Hopper: Colors, the Polaroids, Damiani (2016)
- Dennis Hopper: In Dreams: Scenes from the Archives, Damiani (2019)

=== Exhibitions ===
- Solo exhibition of assemblages, Primus-Stuart Gallery, Los Angeles (1963)
- Los Angeles Now group exhibition, Robert Fraser Gallery, London (1966)
- Bomb Drop, Pasadena Art Museum, Pasadena (1968)
- Dennis Hopper: Black and White Photographs, Fort Worth Museum of Art, Fort Worth (1970)
- Dennis Hopper: Black and White Photographs, Corcoran Gallery of Art, Washington, DC (1971)
- Dennis Hopper and Ed Ruscha, Tony Shafrazi Gallery, New York (1992)
- Dennis Hopper: A System of Moments, Museum für angewandte Kunst, Vienna (2001)
- Dennis Hopper & the New Hollywood, Cinémathèque française, Paris (2008–09)
- Dennis Hopper & the New Hollywood, Australian Centre for the Moving Image, Melbourne (2009–10)
- Dennis Hopper: Double Standard, Museum of Contemporary Art (MOCA), Los Angeles (2010)
- The Lost Album, Gagosian, New York (2013)
- The Lost Album, Royal Academy of Arts, London (2014)

=== Music ===
- Demon Days (album, 2005), Gorillaz, "Fire Coming Out of the Monkey's Head" (song)
- The Mountain (album, 2026), Gorillaz, "The Mountain" (song)

== Archive ==
The moving image collection of Dennis Hopper is held at the Academy Film Archive. The Dennis Hopper Trust Collection represents Hopper's directorial efforts.

== Awards and nominations ==
Year	Award	Category	Work	Result	Ref(s)
1969	Academy Awards	Best Original Screenplay (shared with Peter Fonda and Terry Southern)	Easy Rider	Nominated	
1969	Cannes Film Festival	Best First Work	Easy Rider	Won	
1969	Cannes Film Festival	Palme d'Or	Easy Rider	Nominated	
1969	Directors Guild of America Awards	Outstanding Directing – Feature Film	Easy Rider	Nominated	
1969	National Society of Film Critics Awards	Special Award (For his achievements as director, co-writer and co-star.)	Easy Rider	Won	
1969	Writers Guild of America Awards	Best Drama Written Directly for the Screen (shared with Peter Fonda and Terry Southern)	Easy Rider	Nominated	
1971	Venice Film Festival	CIDALC Award	The Last Movie	Won	
1980	Cannes Film Festival	Palme d'Or	Out of the Blue	Nominated	
1986	Boston Society of Film Critics	Best Supporting Actor (tied with Ray Liotta for Something Wild)	Blue Velvet	Won	
1986	Independent Spirit Awards	Best Male Lead	Blue Velvet	Nominated	
1986	Montreal World Film Festival	Best Actor	Blue Velvet	Won	
1986	National Society of Film Critics Awards	Best Supporting Actor	Blue Velvet	Won	
1986	Golden Globe Awards	Best Supporting Actor	Blue Velvet	Nominated	
1986	Golden Globe Awards	Best Supporting Actor	Hoosiers	Nominated	
1986	Academy Awards	Best Supporting Actor	Hoosiers	Nominated	
1986	Los Angeles Film Critics Association	Best Supporting Actor	Hoosiers + Blue Velvet	Won	
1991	Emmy Awards	Outstanding Lead Actor – Miniseries or a Movie	Paris Trout	Nominated	
1991	CableACE Awards	Outstanding Lead Actor – Movie or Miniseries	Paris Trout	Nominated	
1991	CableACE Awards	Outstanding Lead Actor – Movie or Miniseries	Doublecrossed	Nominated	
1994	MTV Movie Awards	Best Villain	Speed	Won	
1995	Razzie Awards	Worst Supporting Actor	Waterworld	Won	

== Bibliography ==
- "Dennis Hopper, Riding High", Playboy (Chicago), Dec. 1969
- Interview with G. O'Brien and M. Netter, in Inter/View (New York), Feb. 1972
- Interview in Cahiers du Cinéma (Paris), July–August 1980
- "How Far to the Last Movie?", Monthly Film Bulletin (London) Oct. 1982
- "Citizen Hopper", interview with C. Hodenfield, in Film Comment (New York) Nov/Dec. 1986
- Interview with B. Kelly, in American Film (Los Angeles) March 1988
- Interview with David Denicolo, in Interview (New York), Feb. 1990
- "Sean Penn", interview with Julian Schnabel and Dennis Hopper, Interview (New York) Sept. 1991
- "Gary Oldman", in Interview (New York), Jan. 1992

Books

- Biskind, Peter. Easy Riders, Raging Bulls: How the Sex-Drugs-and-Rock 'N' Roll Generation Saved Hollywood, Simon and Schuster (1999)
- Hoberman, J. Dennis Hopper: From Method to Madness, Walker Art Center (1988)
- Krull, Craig. "Photographing the LA Art Scene: 1955–1975", Craig Krull Gallery (1996)
- Rodriguez, Elean. Dennis Hopper: A Madness to his Method, St. Martin's Press (1988)
- Dennis Hopper: Photographs 1961–1967, Taschen (2011)
- Winkler, Peter L. "Dennis Hopper: The Wild Ride of a Hollywood Rebel", Barricade Books (2011)
- Folsom, Tom. "Hopper: A Journey into the American Dream", It Books/HarperCollins (2013)
- Rozzo, Mark "Everybody Thought We Were Crazy" HarperCollins (2022)
- Naish, Stephen Lee "Create or Die: Essays on the Artistry of Dennis Hopper" Routledge (2016)
- Naish, Stephen Lee "Music and Sound in the films of Dennis Hopper" Routledge (2024)

Articles

- Algar, N., "Hopper at Birmingham", in Sight and Sound (London), Summer 1982
- Burke, Tom, "Dennis Hopper Saves the Movies", in Esquire (New York), Dec. 1970
- Burns, Dan E., "Dennis Hopper's The Last Movie: Beginning of the End", in Literature/Film Quarterly, 1979
- Herring, H. D., "Out of the Dream and into the Nightmare: Dennis Hopper's Apocalyptic Vision of America", in Journal of Popular Film (Washington, D.C.), Winter 1983
- Hopper, Marin (September 9, 2014). "Dennis Hopper Day Descends on Taos, N.M." The New York Times Style Magazine.
- Macklin, F. A., "Easy Rider: The Initiation of Dennis Hopper", in Film Heritage (Dayton, Ohio), Fall 1969
- Martin, A., "Dennis Hopper: Out of the Blue and into the Black", in Cinema Papers (Melbourne), July 1987
- Scharres, B., "From Out of the Blue: The Return of Dennis Hopper" in Journal of the University Film and Video Assoc. (Carbondale, IL), Spring 1983
- Weber, Bruce, "A Wild Man is Mellowing, Albeit Not on Screen", in New York Times, September 8, 1994
