= Hell: A Cyberpunk Thriller =

1994 video game

- Developers: Take-Two Interactive (MS-DOS); Tetragon (3DO)
- Publisher: GameTek; Take-Two Publishing: JP: GAGA Communications Inc., Namco
- Producer: John Antinori
- Designers: John Antinori; Laura Kampo
- Programmers: Greg Brown; Frank Kern
- Artist: Quinno Martin
- Writers: John Antinori; Dennis Johnson; Laura Kampo
- Composer: Michael Bross
- Platforms: MS-DOS, 3DO, Classic Mac OS, Windows
- Release: MS-DOS, 3DO: NA: December 1994; EU: 1994; Mac: JP: February 29, 1996; Windows: JP: July 12, 1996
- Genre: Point-and-click adventure
- Mode: Single-player

Hell: A Cyberpunk Thriller is a point-and-click adventure game released in 1994, developed by Take-Two Interactive Software and published by GameTek for MS-DOS. It was ported to 3DO, Classic Mac OS, and Windows. It was designed by the same team as BloodNet, the story of which is referenced to during one of Hell's subplots. Dennis Hopper, Grace Jones, Stephanie Seymour, and Geoffrey Holder are among the actors in the game. Seymour and Holder appear in live action footage, while the rest of the cast, including Hopper and Jones, lend their voices to computer-animated representations.

The story is told through a variety of partial screen full-motion video (FMV). The 3DO version uses the same movies, but runs entirely in full screen. The game is set in a dystopian 2095, and the United States of America is under the control of a fascist theocracy called the "Hand of God". Unlike theocracies of the past, this government can send criminals and insurgents to hell, and has even brought a few of them back to tell their tale. In this third-person perspective, dystopian environment, players control Gideon Eshanti and Rachel Braque, two loyal agents (and lovers) of a new law enforcement agency created by the theocracy: Artificial Reality Containment, or ARC, a Cultural Revolution-like organization that enforces a ban on cybernetic technology in general and virtual reality in particular.

Hell sold 300,000 units within six months of its release. Take-Two developed two more FMV adventure games: Ripper and Black Dahlia.

== Gameplay ==
Hell: A Cyberpunk Thriller generally follows the conventional gameplay rules of point-and-click adventures, though with a particular focus on solving codes. Players can choose to have either Gideon Eshanti or Rachel Braque as their lead character, but this has no effect on the puzzles, only changing some story sequences near the end of the game. The player must also acquire several supporting party members throughout the game, each of whom comes with their own small inventory of items. Party size is limited, and if the player ejects one party member for a new one, the ejected party member will take all his items with him, even if they have been placed in someone else's inventory slots. However, party members can be re-recruited simply by visiting the spot where they were originally recruited.

Unlike most point-and-click adventure games, approaching some of the puzzles in Hell incorrectly results in a game over, with a brief cutscene in which Braque and Eshanti's deaths are reported to Solene Solux.

=== Puzzle errors ===
Due to several script oversights and programming errors that appear in both the PC and 3DO versions, some of the game's puzzles cannot be solved by following the clues provided. For one, the demon Abonides shouts out a code which yields three clue phrases. However, the subtitles and the replay function (which are what the player will almost certainly refer to when attempting the puzzle) have three numbers that are either incorrect or out of order; decoding these numbers yields two non-existent words, "friut" and "oiv", which are of no use as clue words. The correct words can only be obtained by following Abonides's actual voice instead of the text. In addition, the clue phrases appear in the wrong order.

A second such puzzle appears in Hell's Schoolroom. The teacher says that the answers to all the questions on the pop quiz are state capitals, when in fact, the answers all take the form of the name of a state capital followed by the name of the state it appears in. Also, commas appear between all the numbers of the pop quiz questions, but some are missing in the 3DO version, making the code appear to be much more complicated than it actually is.

== Plot ==
ARC agents Gideon Eshanti and Rachel Braque are spending the night together when they are attacked by a government execution squad. After killing the scrub agents, they flee to the apartment of Dante Scrivner. Dante offers them the use of his apartment, and says he'll use his connections to help investigate why the "Hand of God" wants them dead. He also provides them a contact with the CFF, a rebel organization trying to overthrow the Hand of God, but they remain hopeful that they'll be able to clear their names instead.

Rachel and Gideon visit their commanding officer, Captain Frank Jersey, to ask him what they've been charged with. They're officially accused of dealing in pornography for the demon Pazuzu, a.k.a. Mr. Beautiful. Mr. Beautiful is repeatedly brought in by Transgressions to finger undesirables such as Rachel and Gideon as his accomplices, while Beautiful himself is let off on a technicality. Intuiting that they were probably two of a group of people due to be "scrubbed" that night, Rachel and Gideon also obtain the "scrub list" from Jersey in hopes of finding a commonality between themselves and the other targets.

Gideon and Rachel head to Foggy Bottoms, where they acquire new allies (including a holographic simulacrum of Gideon's deceased ex-girlfriend Cynna Stone, an explosives expert) before summoning Mr. Beautiful. Not only does Beautiful refuse them any information, he persistently behaves as though the two of them truly are his longstanding accomplices, and gives them a mission to Hell to stop his rival, Sanguinarius. Hoping to get something out of this, they accept. Once in Hell, they take a variety of high-tech weapons from Sanguinarius's arsenal, and use them to kill the demon. Beautiful returns them to the mortal plane but again refuses them any help.

Gideon and Rachel visit another tech violator, Dr. Clean and she sells them an illegal lockpick implant. They use it to break into the office of Transgressions agent Jean Saint Mouchoir, an obsessive diarist. While they are able to get through most of the passwords on his computer, they cannot access his records on an operation called "Night of the Re-entombment", and an entry on the two of them indicates that even Mouchoir is ignorant of the reason they are on the scrub list. However, they are able to obtain locations of several "fringe" groups which include people on the scrub list.

By now convinced that the Hand of God is corrupt, they use Dante's contact with the CFF, who tells them to aid in an assassination attempt on the USA's ruler, Imperator Solene Solux, to prove their sincerity. They agree, but the attempt fails. They continue to investigate the rest of the scrub list, and meet up with demon hunter Dean Sterling, who enlists them in taking out a demon porn film director, Asmodeus. After a presumed encounter in hell, they awaken back on Earth, where Sterling tells them that Asmodeus had them hooked up to virtual reality decks. Sterling shot Asmodeus, who turns out to be an android. Hell is a virtual reality program created by the Hand of God to instill fear in the people. Gideon and Rachel head to Dante's apartment to find out who made the program crash. Dante tells them a Deep Throat contacted him online with an address for their virtual reality decks. They use it to meet up with Deep Throat in a cloaked virtual reality locale.

Meanwhile, they find that all the others on the scrub list were involved in illegal activities. Moreover, all of them, including Gideon and Rachel, habitually mouthed a Latin phrase. In exchange for recovering a stolen text, the leader of a fringe group translates the phrases into English, and deduces they are a code for a word. They use this word to access Mouchoir's records on The Night of the Re-entombment, which say that the people on the scrub list were all captured CFF agents who were mindwiped, given new memories, physically rebuilt, and implanted with subconscious impulses to take down the CFF. It adds that some of these agents failed to follow these impulses, so all of them were put on the scrub list to be safe. Rachel points out that even if what the records say is possible, it makes no sense for the government to have gone to such immense trouble and expense. But they shrug the matter off and cease their investigation into the reason behind their being on the scrub list.

They return to CFF headquarters and inform their leader, Senator Erin Burr, that Hell is virtual. Though virtual reality tech is outlawed, the Hand of God has developed it in secret, resulting in a Hell program far more realistic than anything tech criminals are capable of. Burr asks them to rescue 12 key CFF supporters from Hell. While rescuing them from various hellpits, Rachel and Gideon are contacted by Deep Throat, who tells them his true identity is Thomas Meaculp, a low-tier programmer for Hell, and that he has been found out. They track Meaculp to the Pentagon Jail and break him out, bringing him to the CFF to work out a means of destroying Hell. They reenter Hell to rescue the remaining CFF supporters, and though Solux herself confronts them in the guise of Satan, they succeed in freeing them all.

(The rest of this summary assumes the player chose Gideon as the lead character. If Rachel is chosen, Gideon and Rachel's parts are swapped, but the plot is otherwise unchanged.)

After Gideon and Rachel return, the CFF techs tell them Rachel must enter the core of the Hell program behind the illusion and locate the spawner application, which is used to create the various Hell pits. As Rachel enters the core, Solene Solux appears and destroys her mind. The CFF techs receive the location of the spawner program just before her death.

After two days of mourning for Rachel, Gideon convinces Senator Burr to let him go ahead with the plan to destroy Hell. He breaks into the central computer room for the Hell program, sending a gas bomb through the tube system to take out the guards. On the way he is confronted by Solux, but he beats her senseless and inserts the disc with the Hell bug. Senator Burr proceeds to take over the Hand of God's entire communication network, broadcasting that Hell is virtual and the Hand have been overthrown. Burr is elected president, and Rachel and Gideon are honored as heroes.

== Reception ==
Reception

Review score
Publication	Score
PC Gamer (US)	92%

Hell was profitable and became a commercial success, with sales of 300,000 units after half a year of release.

Tommy Glide of GamePro gave the 3DO version a positive review, particularly praising the astounding amount of voice acting and its consistently high quality. He also remarked that the music "carries a cyber-gothic tone, not unlike something scored by Nine Inch Nails", the advanced rendered graphics are impressive, and that "The ominous imagery and use of color make this game as fascinating to watch as it is to play." The four reviewers of Electronic Gaming Monthly were most impressed with the complex, adult-themed story. However, they criticized that the game requires excessive precision with the cursor in order to find objects. They scored it a 7.125 out of 10.

Next Generation reviewed the 3DO version of the game, rating it two stars out of five, and stated that "a lot of time is spent just watching, and if that sounds dull, well, it is."

In 1996, Computer Gaming World declared Hell: A Cyberpunk Thriller the 12th-worst computer game ever released.

== Novelization ==
A novelization by Chet Williamson was released in 1995 by Prima Lifestyles.
