= NanoTek Warrior =

1997 video game

- Developer: Tetragon Inc.
- Publisher: Virgin Interactive Entertainment
- Designer: Mark Skaggs
- Programmers: Jay Stelly; Mark Beardsley
- Artists: Joey Bryant; Don Williams; Calvin Anderson
- Composer: Matt Furniss
- Platform: PlayStation
- Release: NA: February 28, 1997; JP: May 9, 1997; EU: June 1997
- Genre: Tube shooter
- Mode: Single-player

NanoTek Warrior is a tube shooter game developed by American studio Tetragon Inc. and released by Virgin Interactive in 1997.

== Gameplay ==
NanoTek Warrior uses behind the ship perspective. There is a total of eight levels in the game. Each level consists of two stages: "Tube-runner mode" and "Boss/Orbit mode". Most of the game is centered in and around the long tubes. The player is able to orbit around the tube, inside and outside. Along the way to the end of the tube, player is able to find and obtain power-ups, such as special weapons and shield health, to help survival to finish, against various enemies and obstacles. Players goal is to get to the end of the tube, where there's a "Mega-boss" of each level he has to fight in order to complete the level. In Boss/Orbit mode, the player orbits around the boss-enemy much like in the Tube-runner mode, and have a one-on-one battle with the boss enemy.

== Story ==
Like many shoot 'em ups, NanoTek Warrior doesn't have any storytelling, aside from the manual of the game.

The story is set in a future in which the world's nanorobots have gained sentience and are rebelling against humanity.

== Development ==
Tetragon developed their own graphic libraries for the game.

Print advertisements for NanoTek Warrior featured a graphic image of a person with his eyelids torn off, complete with torn flesh and blood where the lids had been. Answering negative reactions to the ad, Virgin Interactive's vice president of marketing stated, "Rather than opt for the route of glorifying death or exploiting profanity, we chose with NanoTek Warrior to simply utilize an eye-catching (no pun intended) comedic play on the video game cliché of 'blink and you'll miss it'. It is in no way intended to be offensive." Electronic Gaming Monthly named it "Worst Print Ad" in their 1998 Video Game Buyer's Guide (beating out the EagleMAX flight stick ad which showed a screaming young man drenched in eagle feces). They commented, "We almost tossed our cookies the first time we saw this one."

== Reception ==
Reception

Aggregate score
Aggregator	Score
GameRankings	76% (5 reviews)

Review scores
Publication	Score
Electronic Gaming Monthly	7.875/10
GameSpot	6.2/10
Next Generation	4/5

Nanotek Warrior was well received by critics, who hailed it as the first strong step into the fifth generation of video game consoles for the shoot 'em up genre. They praised the game's heavy yet balanced challenge, graphics, sound effects, techno soundtrack, and sophisticated take on tube shooter gameplay. Major Mike gave the game a rave review in GamePro, summarizing, "Amid the drought of PlayStation shooters, Nanotek Warrior is a thunderstorm: It's an intense blaster with challenging stages and awesome bosses." While Dan Hsu of Electronic Gaming Monthly said that players would likely be done with the game in a week, he still recommended it because "excellent quality shooters like this are few and far between," and his co-reviewers Shawn Smith and Crispin Boyer contended that the game has high longevity due its challenge and replay value. Both Sushi-X (the fourth reviewer in the EGM team) and GameSpot staff felt Nanotek Warrior was more of a step in the right direction than a full-on revival for the shoot 'em up genre. GameSpot also criticized that the control is awkward and would have benefited from an analog paddle controller. By contradiction, a reviewer for Next Generation asserted that "The days of frenetic arcade shooters didn't die with the birth of 3D. We've just had to wait for a developer (in this case, Tetragon) creative enough to bring the ten-thrill-a-second experience that embodied 2D shooters to 3D. Nanotek does that, and with such brilliance it practically gives rebirth to the genre."

Despite the positive response from critics, NanoTek Warrior was a commercial failure.
