= Jeff Tunnell =

American video game producer

Jeffrey Tunnell is an American video game producer, programmer and designer.

== Career ==
In 1984, Tunnell founded Dynamix with Damon Slye in Eugene, Oregon.

In 1990, he left Dynamix to start Jeff Tunnell Productions. Tunnell would go on to create famous brands such as The Incredible Machine, Trophy Bass, and the 3-D Ultra Pinball series while at Jeff Tunnell Productions. These products were some of the most successful retail products to be published by Dynamix.

In 1993, Sid & Al's Incredible Toons earned Tunnell and Chris Cole a patent for the game's concepts.

In 1995, Tunnell returned to Dynamix in a leadership role.

In 2001, after Dynamix was disbanded, Tunnell co-founded GarageGames, an independent video game publisher. GarageGames was acquired by InterActiveCorp in 2007. Tunnell remained on as Chief Creative Officer of GarageGames before leaving in 2008.

In 2009, Tunnell founded PushButton Labs along with former partners and employees from GarageGames and Dynamix. PushButton Labs led development on one of the most successful games of 2010, Playdom's Social City, which reached more than 10M monthly active users. PushButton Labs IP was acquired by Disney in 2011 and they subsequently wound down operations.

In 2012, Tunnell founded Spotkin along with former partners of PushButton Labs, GarageGames, and Dynamix.

On March 22, 2017, Tunnell announced his retirement from game development, citing market saturation as a deciding factor.

On June 13, 2020, Tunnell returned to game development by announcing the creation of Monster Ideas, a company that plans to produce "community economy" games that use crypto technology on the backend.

== Games ==
- Arcticfox (1986), Dynamix
- Skyfox II: The Cygnus Conflict (1987), Electronic Arts
- Project Firestart (1989), Electronic Arts
- Motocross (1989), Gamestar
- Ghostbusters II (1989), Activision
- Deathtrack (1989), Activision
- David Wolf: Secret Agent (1989), Dynamix
- Caveman Ugh-Lympics (1989), Electronic Arts
- A-10 Tank Killer (1989), Dynamix
- Stellar 7 (1990), Dynamix
- Rise of the Dragon (1990), Sierra On-Line
- Red Baron (1990), Sierra On-Line
- Heart of China (1991), Sierra On-Line
- The Adventures of Willy Beamish (1991), Sierra On-Line
- Quarky & Quaysoo's Turbo Science (1992), Sierra On-Line
- Mega Math (1992), Sierra On-Line
- Sid & Al's Incredible Toons (1993), Sierra On-Line
- The Incredible Machine (1993), Sierra On-Line
- Betrayal at Krondor (1993), Sierra On-Line
- Alien Legacy (1993), Sierra On-Line
- Lode Runner: The Legend Returns (1994), Sierra On-Line
- The Incredible Toon Machine (1994), Sierra On-Line
- The Incredible Machine 2 (1994), Sierra On-Line
- Bouncers (1994), SEGA Entertainment
- Lode Runner Online: The Mad Monks' Revenge (1995), Sierra On-Line
- Hunter Hunted (1996), Sierra On-Line
- 3-D Ultra Pinball: Creep Night (1996), Sierra On-Line
- Rama (1997), Sierra On-Line
- Starsiege: Tribes (1998), Sierra On-Line
- Starsiege (1998), Sierra On-Line
- 3-D Ultra Minigolf (1998), Sierra On-Line
- Return of the Incredible Machine: Contraptions (2000), Sierra On-Line
- 3-D Ultra Lionel Train Town Deluxe (2000), Sierra On-Line
- Tribes 2 (2001), Sierra On-Line
- Marble Blast Gold (2003), GarageGames
- Chain Reaction (2003), Monster Studios
- Marble Blast Ultra (2006), GarageGames
- Rack 'Em Up Roadtrip (2006), Oberon Media
- Puzzle Poker (2006), GarageGames
- Grunts: Skirmish (2009), PushButton Labs
- Social City (2010), PushButton Labs, Playdom
- The Incredible Machine: Mobile (2010), PushButton Labs, Playdom
- Quick Shooter (2012), Spotkin
- Double Doodle (2013), Spotkin
- Contraption Maker (2014), Spotkin
