= Arcade Volleyball =

1988 video game

- Publisher: COMPUTE!'s Gazette
- Designer: Rhett Anderson
- Programmers: Rhett Anderson; Randy Thompson (Amiga)
- Platforms: Commodore 64, Amiga, MS-DOS
- Release: 1988: C64; 1989: Amiga, MS-DOS
- Genre: Sports
- Modes: Single-player, multiplayer

Arcade Volleyball is a sports video game written by Rhett Anderson for the Commodore 64 and published as a type-in program in the June 1988 issue of COMPUTE!'s Gazette. It was ported to Amiga and MS-DOS by different programmers and was included in a 12-game collection called Best Gazette Games. The author later released the game into the public domain.

== Gameplay ==
Original Commodore 64 version

The game features teams of one or two players (depending on the platform) shaped like balls with legs who hit the volleyball with their heads. The game is played from a side-view perspective, and the ball can be bounced off of the walls and ceiling without penalty. Scoring is based on the original volleyball scoring rules, where only the serving team can score on each volley, and 15 points are required to win the game. The same head is permitted to hit the ball multiple times, but the team may only hit the ball three times while the ball is on their side.

== Development ==
Arcade Volleyball was originally published as a hexadecimal type-in program for MLX in the June 1988 edition of Commodore 64 magazine COMPUTE!'s Gazette. The article was written by Rhett Anderson and David Hensley, Jr., who had also published a similar game called Basketball Sam & Ed in the July 1987 issue. The game featured two heads per team, controlled by a single player, which moved and jumped together. It was not necessary to win the game by 2 points; when either side reached 15 points, the game would pause and ask if the user wanted to play again.

By default the game was played between two human players, but it was possible to modify the game so that one player could play against the computer by typing "POKE 2065,1" to type the number 1 into the memory address that controlled the number of players. The authors referred to this as an optional practice mode or warm up mode and warned that the computer opponent was not very challenging. The game was inspired by Pong (actually, the two-paddle "Hockey" variant of Pong) and programmed by Rhett Anderson.

== Ports ==
Amiga version

Rhett Anderson and Randy Thompson wrote an Amiga version of Arcade Volleyball from scratch. It was included as an executable program, with source code, on the cover disk of the Fall 1989 edition of Compute!'s Amiga Resource. The Amiga version differs from the Commodore 64 version by only having one player per team (a green head versus a red head), requires a 2-point margin of victory, it is no longer possible for the ball to go under the net, and playing against the computer is a standard option.*

MS-DOS version

The MS-DOS version was sold in a 9-game collection called COMPUTE!'s Best PC Games. It was written with Borland Turbo C and has the same physics and gameplay as the Amiga version, but uses 4-color CGA graphics and PC speaker sound.

== See also ==
- Bouncers, a Sega CD game from the same designers
