= Laser Chess =

1987 video game

- Designer: Mike Duppong
- Platforms: Atari ST, Amiga, Commodore 64, Apple II, Atari 8-bit
- Release: 1987
- Genre: Strategy

Laser Chess is a two-player, strategy video game modeled as a board game with chess-like pieces, most of which have mirrored surfaces, and one of which is a laser cannon. Laser Chess first appeared in Compute!'s Atari ST Disk & Magazine in 1987, written in Modula-2, winning the $5,000 first prize in the magazine's programming competition.

Ports written in BASIC and machine language were published in the June 1987 issue of Compute! for the Amiga, Commodore 64, Apple II, and Atari 8-bit computers as type-in programs. Laser Chess has been re-implemented many times, including a variant Advanced Laser Chess with a larger board and additional pieces.

== Gameplay ==
Players alternate turns taking two actions with their pieces. An action consists of moving a piece vertically or laterally, rotating a piece 90 degrees, or firing the laser cannon. One piece can teleport pieces that it lands on.

Moving a distance of one square takes one action; moving two squares takes two actions. Since a player has only two actions per turn, the maximum distance a piece can be moved on one turn is two squares. Pieces can be moved forward, backward, left, or right, but not diagonally. However, a player can effectively move a piece diagonally by using two actions—for example, forward and right.

The player can elect to fire the laser cannon. Firing the laser cannon takes only one action, but can be done only once per turn. Therefore, a player may want to use the first action in a turn to aim the laser, rotate a reflecting piece to set up a reflected shot, or move another piece into position. Laser beams are absorbed if they hit the edge of the board.

The laser will bounce off any mirrored piece, so both a player's own and the opponent's pieces may be used to set up a shot. Since a player is focused on creating a path from that player's laser cannon to a target of interest, the player must be aware that a return path is also created for the opponent at the same time.

Some mirrored pieces can be destroyed by aiming the beam at one of their non-reflective sides, and others will simply absorb the beam harmlessly. Each player also has a beam splitter.

== Legacy ==
In an MS-DOS re-implementation by Peter Venable (1994), the pieces move like normal chess pieces on a 9x9 board, with the laser moving like a king, and a turn consists of making any number of rotations to one's pieces followed by either playing a chess move or firing the laser.

== Availability ==
The 1980s versions of Laser Chess and re-implementation of it are available to play online on a number of retro gaming sites. Laser Chess and Advanced Laser Chess are also available for most popular retro computers from laserchess.org.

== See also ==
- Lazer Maze (1982)
- Deflektor (1987)
- Khet (2005), board game
