= The Incredible Machine (1993 video game) =

- Developer: Jeff Tunnell Productions
- Publishers: Sierra On-Line; Dynamix (3DO)
- Producer: Jeff Tunnell
- Designer: Kevin Ryan
- Programmer: Kevin Ryan
- Artist: Dennis Clevenger
- Composer: Christopher Stevens
- Series: The Incredible Machine
- Platforms: Classic Mac OS, MS-DOS, Windows, FM Towns, PC-98, 3DO
- Release: Original: 1993 (DOS); 1994 (FM Towns, PC-98, 3DO); Even More: 1993 (Mac, MS-DOS, Windows 3.x)
- Genre: Puzzle
- Mode: Single-player

The Incredible Machine is a puzzle video game published in 1993 by Sierra On-Line for Classic Mac OS and MS-DOS. Versions for 3DO, FM Towns, and PC-98 were released in 1994. The objective of the game is to create Rube Goldberg machines by arranging collections of objects in a complex fashion, so as to perform some simple task (such as "put the ball into a box" or "start a mixer and turn on a fan").

The game was the first in The Incredible Machine series and was followed by The Even More Incredible Machine, an extended version of the original. It has 160 levels, about twice the number of levels in the original game, and more parts to use in the contraptions.

== Development ==
The Incredible Machine was originally going to be developed by Electronic Arts for the Commodore 64 in 1984, but Dynamix worked on Arcticfox for the Amiga instead and work did not start on The Incredible Machine until the spring of 1992. Kevin Ryan programmed The Incredible Machine in nine months, on a $36,000 budget. (Note: Other sources say $35,000 budget.) The Macintosh and Windows versions were developed by Presage Software.

== Reception ==
Computer Gaming World in 1993 praised The Incredible Machine, stating that while the 80 puzzles "are a blast" the Free Form Mode was the game's best feature; "the curious, tinkering 10-year-old is re-awakened, given a digital toy box and set loose in the backyard of his or her mind". The magazine concluded that the game was "one of the most innovative and deceptively addicting products to pass this way in quite a while ... a well-oiled imagination machine with a very broad appeal". In 1993, Dragon gave the game 4 out of 5 stars. Electronic Gaming Monthly gave the 3DO version a 7.25 out of 10, saying that its controls are too slow due to the lack of mouse support, but that it is nonetheless better than the PC version due to the dramatically improved graphics and sound.

In 1996, Computer Gaming World named The Incredible Machine the 62nd best game ever. The editors summarized it as "fresh in concept and long on gameplay".

The game sold over 800,000 units.

=== The Even More Incredible Machine ===
Scott A. May for Compute! said "The Even More Incredible Machine is divine madness – a delightfully addicting, thoroughly intelligent arcade game that should not be missed".

PC Zone said "The Even More Incredible Machine is addictive and testing. Furthermore, it is flexible enough to last. The real puzzle, however, is reserved for the retailers, who must how out how to stack the weird-shaped box on their shelves".

T. Liam McDonald for Game Players PC Entertainment said "if you're a puzzle fan who hasn't picked up the original, you'll definitely want to explore the zany world of The Even More Incredible Machine".

Stephen Kent for CD-ROM Today said: "This game will not return you to the awe-struck discovery years of your childhood, but it's a fun-filled return to the machines that usually only function in a child’s mind".

Computer Gaming World's Ed Dille in 1993 stated that "The Even More Incredible Machine lives up to its billing, surpassing the original in terms of play value, if not presentation".

=== Awards ===
The Incredible Machine was nominated for an award at the 1993 Game Developers Conference, and was the winner of several prizes due to its innovative style and simulation abilities. It was innovative enough that Sid & Al's Incredible Toons earned Jeff Tunnell and Chris Cole a patent for the game concepts.

The Incredible Machine for iPad/iPhone also won Best iPhone/iPad Game and was nominated for Best Puzzle Game at E3 by IGN.
