= The Incredible Machine (disambiguation) =

The Incredible Machine is a puzzle video game series about building Rube Goldberg devices.

The Incredible Machine may also refer to:

- The Incredible Machine (1993 video game), the original release in the series
- The Incredible Machine (film), a 1975 documentary film
- The Incredible Machine (album), a 2010 album by the duo Sugarland
