= Pot Farm =

2010 farming simulation game

- Developer: Brain Warp Studios
- Platforms: Android; iOS
- Release: April 20, 2010
- Genres: Simulation, role-playing
- Modes: Single-player, multiplayer

Pot Farm (also known as Pot Farm: Grass Roots and Bud Farm: Grass Roots in some markets) is a farming simulation social network game developed by Brain Warp Studios and owned by East Side Games. Gameplay involves planting and harvesting different strains of cannabis and manufacturing cannabis-based food items. Many of the plants, quests and achievements are named after elements of cannabis subculture.

It is available as an Android and iOS app, and was previously available as an application via the social networking website Facebook. On Facebook, the game was restricted to players 21 and older. Although the game could not be advertised online due to its content, it gained popularity through word-of-mouth and guerrilla marketing, and formed one of the world's largest cannabis-culture communities. The game was generally well received by critics and was nominated for Best Social/Casual Game at the Canadian Videogame Awards.

== Gameplay ==
Gameplay of Pot Farm on Facebook

Gameplay on mobile app

Pot Farm is a game similar to Happy Farm and FarmVille, but with an emphasis on cannabis cultivation. On mobile, the game is free-to-play and requires an internet connection.

The game starts with an empty plot of land, with the objective of turning it into a profitable cannabis farm. Players plant and harvest seeds, earning experience points and buds, which can be sold for coins. Crops need to be watered and cleared of cobwebs. Quests and jobs are also available to earn additional experience and items, and upgrades to the farm can be made to increase the harvest. Customers within the game demand certain strains to be grown, some of which are unlocked as player experience increases. The game's secondary currency, potbucks, are earned by gaining levels, watching advertisements, and by visiting other players' farms; they can also be bought with real currency through microtransactions.

Pot Farm, similar to other farming games, has a "withering" mechanic that causes untended crops to lose their value, however, unlike its competitors Pot Farm has an option to add "protection level" for its crops. In the Facebook version, if crops are not balanced with guards and other protection-enhancing items, there is a risk of a character called Ranger Dick appearing and confiscating stash and crops. Additionally, the same version has a minigame-like feature called 'Gold Rush Mode', which has been compared to Bejeweled.

== Development and release ==
Pot Farm was developed Brain Warp Studios, specifically by Josh Nilson and Galan Akin in 2010, and published on April 20, 2010. The success of the app led to the creation of East Side Games in 2011, which the developers founded with Jason Bailey of SuperRewards. They had received $1.5 million of angel funding by July that year. The developers have reportedly only given one interview about the game, and used the "Uncle Floyd" character persona from the game to do so. East Side Games is based in Vancouver, and its sister company LDRLY, which specializes in cannabis mobile games, is based in nearby Nanaimo.

A representative from LDRLY spoke to Canadian media in 2019 about the game, saying that the team wanted to make tackle a different avenue with canabis-centered themes different and build community around it. Furthermore, they thought it was an untapped market and a great business opportunity. However, East Side Games were unable to promote the game on Facebook, and struggled to find marketing in other places because of the cannabis theme; they instead used viral marketing and guerrilla marketing. In May 2011, the developers produced 4:20 rally kits for fans attending cannabis-activism rallys.

In 2011, East Side Games added a Facebook extension "Pot Farm Raiders", based on the Zynga Facebook app Mafia Wars, where the same principles apply as in Pot Farm but mafia gets replaced with stoners, and players can steal crops from other farms. This game had about 72,000 monthly active users in 2011. The 2012 monthly active users count for the main Facebook game was about 880,000 compared to 82.4 million for Farmville in 2010.

The Android mobile app, developed by LDRLY, launched in 2016 and quickly had over 10 million downloads; the iOS app launched the same year. Its success saw East Side Games listed as one of Pocket Gamer's Top 10 Mobile Game Developers to Watch. By 2019, the mobile app had been played over 3.5 billion times. Morepver, developers published a board game version of Pot Farm in 2015, funded by a Kickstarter campaign, and released a spin-off video game Cheech & Chong: Bud Farm on April 20, 2020. The Facebook version of the game shut down in December 2019.

== Reception and legacy ==
By the end of 2010, Pot Farm was estimated to be earning its developers $148,000 a month. Most of the game's revenue comes from the subscription service offered to its players, and it had a Facebook user score of 4.8 out of 5 from around 107,000 reviews. With the release of the mobile app, and the subsequent shut down of the Facebook app, the game saw its loyal fanbase move platforms with it. It was nominated for 'Best Social/Casual Game' in the Canadian Videogame Awards 2011, with Benedetti writing "In case you didn't know, the Canadians totally love the cannabis".

Comparing the game to other popular farming sims, NBC News's Wendy Benedetti said that "this is not your grandmother's Farmville. Unless, of course, your grandmother was a hippie in the '60s... in which case, dude, this is totally her kind of Farmville" and concluded that "[the game] features some decent production values and a zany sense of humor (check out the sketchy wildlife) and that's enough to keep me coming back". David Silverberg for GameSpot described it as a "tycoon-type" game that "was a huge hit on Facebook because it didn't sway too far from the core appeal of the extremely popular Farmville". He credited the rise in cannabis-empire games to Pot Farm's success. MMO Games also compared gameplay to Farmville "but a lot cooler [...] far less gimmicky and more in-depth", ranking Pot Farm among "the best game of its genre on Facebook". The review noted that the multiplayer aspects are more fun than solo gameplay, but that it is still a fun and accessible game.

HERB said that the game's "dedicated underground fanbase and high levels of engagement are a testament to the game's impressive art, contraband content and strong community engagement", writing that "whether you're a diehard gamer looking for refreshingly fun graphics or a stoner looking to spend time on a perfectly addictive app, Pot Farm: Grass Roots has more than enough to keep any digital pot farmer thoroughly entertained".

Drew Cohen of Kotaku said that the game "operates much as you'd anticipate from a Facebook-hosted farming game", while praising the laid-back attitude of the game and noting that its design was not as "slouchy" as the deadbeat stoners in it. Gita Jackson of Kotaku said that the game "has a lot of heart", calling it "Animal Crossing-esque".

Fox News, however, reported that the game was controversial and quoted several concerned citizens; while one said that it should not be on Facebook because it is not for children, another noted that when she tried to see what it was from her children's accounts it would not load due to an age block enforced on anyone under 21. East Bay Express also pointed out that "the game doesn't actually depict anyone ever smoking the plant". The Facebook game operated in a "legal gray area" because of its content, but was also more geared towards medical cannabis (legal in California with some restrictions where Facebook is based, to have not banned the game): its highest-level build was a medical marijuana clinic.

In 2020, GameSpot noted the game's place in the history of cannabis in video games: "As cannabis became less taboo and the smoke cleared from the hysteria sparked by the war on drugs, more developers devoted entire games to running cannabis enterprises [...] Pot Farm took off [as] American views of cannabis softened, most notably on the political level, state-by-state." HERB had written in 2016 that the game created "the largest cannabis community on earth", with 20 million unique players across its platforms and a 2011 figure of over 1 million users on Facebook.
