= Social network game =

Type of online game

A social network game (sometimes simply referred to as a social media game, social gaming, or online social game) is a type of online game that is played through social networks or social media. They typically feature gamification systems with multiplayer gameplay mechanics. Social network games were originally implemented as browser games. As mobile gaming took off, the games moved to mobile as well. While they share many aspects of traditional video games, social network games often employ additional ones that make them distinct. Traditionally they are oriented to be social games and casual games.

The first cross-platform "Facebook-to-Mobile" social network game was developed in 2011 by a Finnish company Star Arcade. Social network games are amongst the most popular games played in the world, with several products with tens of millions of players. (Lil) Green Patch, Happy Farm, and Mob Wars were some of the first successful games of this genre. FarmVille, Mafia Wars, Kantai Collection, and The Sims Social are more recent examples of popular social network game.

Major companies that made or published social network games include Zynga, Wooga and Bigpoint Games.

== Demographics ==
As of 2010, it was reported that 55 percent of the social network gaming demographic in the United States consisted of women while in the United Kingdom, women made up nearly 60 percent of the demographic. In addition, most social gamers were around the 30 to 59 age range, with the average social gamer being 43 years old.

Social gaming may appeal more to the older demographic because it is free, easier to advance through in a short period, does not involve as much violence as traditional video games, and is easier to grasp.

Other games target certain demographics that use social media, such as Pot Farm creating a community by involving elements of cannabis subculture in its gameplay.

== Technology and platforms ==
A social network video game is a client-server application.

The client in the web era was implemented with a mix of web technologies like Flash, HTML5, PHP and JavaScript. When mobile games moved to mobile, social game front ends were developed using mobile platform technologies like Java, Objective-C, Swift and C++.

The back end was a mix of programming languages and systems, including PHP, Ruby, C++ and go.

Where social network video games diverged from traditional game development was the combination of real-time analytics to continuously optimize game mechanics to drive growth, revenue, and engagement.

== Distinct features ==
The following table outlines common characteristics of social games, mentioned by Björk at the 2010 GCO Games Convention Online:

Characteristic	Potential enablers	Consequences	Examples
Public player statistics Information regarding players' game instances are publicly available	Static relations; Ephemeral events; Global high score lists; Friend lists	Social status	Mafia Wars; Icy Tower; Social Empires
Persistent game worlds Game state is independent from individual players' game and play sessions	Static relations; Spontaneity; Fiction	Tick-based games	FrontierVille; LifeSocialGame
Tick-based games Game time progresses according to real time, but in discrete steps	Persistent game worlds	Asynchronicity; Asynchronous games; Downtime; Encouraged return	FarmVille; Parking Wars; LifeSocialGame
Events timed to real world Game play events initiated by specific real time events occurring	Tick-based games	Ephemeral events; Evolving game play design; Encouraged return visits	Mafia Wars; LifeSocialGame
Evolving gameplay design Rules of a game instance change as gameplay takes place	Events timed to real world	Ephemeral events; Encouraged return visits; Exploration; Red queen dilemma	Mafia Wars; FarmVille; Parking Wars; Normic
Encouraged return visits Players are encouraged to return frequently to a certain part of game space	Catching ephemeral events; Continuous goals; Risk/reward; Tick-based games	Grinding	Parking Wars; LifeSocialGame
Grinding The need to perform a certain task considered easy repeatedly	Difficulty and punishments; Encouraged return visits	Pottering	FarmVille; LifeSocialGame; Kantai Collection
Drop-in/drop-out Designed support to handle players entering and leaving ongoing game sessions	Asynchronicity; Persistent game worlds	Spontaneity; Ephemeral events	Pet societies[sic]; Lego Star Wars
Private game spaces Parts of the game space that only a single player can manipulate directly	Difficulty and punishments; Narrativity; Persistent Game Worlds; Drop-In/Drop-Out	Construction; Visits; Massively single-player games	FarmVille; Puerto Rico; Kantai Collection
Massively single-player online games Games making use of other players' game instances to provide input to the game state	Asynchronicity; Private game spaces		
Construction Changing or rearranging game elements to form more complex structures	Fiction; Narrativity; Private game spaces	Pottering	Mafia Wars; FarmVille; LifeSocialGame
Pottering The management of game resources for its own sake	Difficulty and punishment; Grinding; Construction	Static relations; Juiciness	FrontierVille; The Sims; Kantai Collection
Visits Temporary access to other players' private game spaces	Inherent sociability; Private game spaces	Ephemeral events; Massively single-player games	FarmVille; Puerto Rico; LifeSocialGame
Altruistic actions Actions that have only explicit benefits for somebody else than is performing the action	Inherent sociability; Free gift inventories; Visits	Non-player help; Collaboration; Expected reciprocity	FarmVille; D&D Tiny Adventures
Non-player help Players can receive help in games by actions from those not playing	Broadcasting ephemeral events; Altruistic actions	Symbolic physicality; Extra-game event broadcasting	FarmVille; Who Wants to Be a Millionaire?
Invites The use of inviting new players to a game as game actions	Inherent sociability; Static relations; Drop-in/drop-out; Non-player help	Extra-game event broadcasting	Mafia Wars; FarmVille; LifeSocialGame
Extra-game event broadcasting Game events are broadcast in a medium where others can perceive them	Achievements; Invites; Non-player help	Broadcasting ephemeral events	Mafia Wars
Collaborative actions Compound actions that require several players to perform actions	Inherent sociability; Altruistic actions; Construction	Symbolic physicality; Cooperation; Delayed reciprocity; Purchasable game advantages	FarmVille; Pandemic; LifeSocialGame
Delayed reciprocity Players perform actions to help others under the assumption that they later will be helped in return	Inherent sociability; Altruistic actions; Collaborative actions	Guilting	FrontierVille; LifeSocialGame
Guilting Trying to influence another placer's actions based upon moral grounds	Ephemeral events; Inherent sociability; Delayed reciprocity		FrontierVille; Intrigue
Purchasable game advantages Players can pay real currency to gain some in-game advantage	Difficulty and punishment; Collaborative actions; Social status		FishVille; FrontierVille; Kantai Collection
Extra–game consequences Some actions within a game has pre-defined effects outside the game system	Inherent sociability; Altruistic actions; Purchasable game advantages	Static relations; Social status	Lil' Green Patch; FarmVille

A social network game may employ any of the following features:

- asynchronous gameplay, which allows rules to be resolved without needing players to play at the same time.
- gamification, which video game mechanics such as achievements and points are applied to those experienced when playing games in order to motivate and engage users.
- community, as one of the most distinct features of social video games is in leveraging the player's social network. Quests or game goals may only be possible if a player "shares" with friends connected by the social network hosting the game or gets them to play, as well as "neighbors" or "allies".
- a lack of victory conditions: there are generally no victory conditions since most developers count on users playing their games often. The game never ends and no one is ever declared winner. Instead, many casual games have "quests" or "missions" for players to complete. This is not true for board game-like social games, such as Scrabble.
- a virtual currency which players usually must purchase with real-world money. With the in-game currency, players can buy upgrades that would otherwise take much longer to earn through in-game achievements. In many cases, some upgrades are only available with the virtual currency.

== Engagement strategies ==
Since social network games are often less challenging than console games and they have relatively shorter game play, they use different techniques to stretch game play and tools to retain users.

Continuous goals: The games assign specific goals for users to achieve. As they advance in the game, the goals become more challenging and time-consuming. They also provide frequent feedback with their performance. Every action will translate towards a certain goal that will be used to attain higher gaming capitals.

Gaming capitals: Players are encouraged to earn different badges, trophies, and accolades that indicate their progress and accomplishments. Some achievements are unlocked just by advancing in the game while others may significantly alter the rationale behind the game and require extensive investment from players. The ways of gaining gaming capital are not limited to playing games but the games-related productive activities that are appreciated in the player's social circle too. By accumulating gaming capitals, they provide an intrinsic benefit to gamers as there is an avenue to boost their accomplishment and showcase their expertise of the game. The achievements are visible to their network of friends. Gaming capitals are a way for developers to increase replay value provides extended play time, and players get more value from the game.

Motivation for collecting gaming capitals:

1. Legitimization: refers to society's willingness to approve or condone certain behavior. Collecting is about channeling one's materialistic desires into more meaningful pursuits. Game achievements serve a similar purpose, allowing players to justify the hours spent playing the game.

2. Self-extension: Gathering and controlling meaningful objects or experiences can work to gain one an improved sense of self. The collector's goal to complete a collection is symbolically about completing the self too.

Events timed to real world: Popular games such as Dragon City and Wild Ones require users to wait a certain time period before their "energy bars" replenish. Without energy, they are unable to conduct any form of action. Gamers are forced to wait and return after their energy replenishes to continue playing.

== Monetization ==
Social network games frequently monetize based on virtual good transactions, but other games are emerging that utilize newer economic models.

=== Virtual goods ===
Gamers will be able to purchase in game items like power-ups, avatar accessories, or decorative items users purchase within the game itself. This is realized by monetize products that do not technically exist. Virtual goods account for over 90% of all revenue generated by the world's top social game developers. Designers optimize user experience through additional gameplay, missions, and quests, without having to worry about overhead or unused stock.

== Advertising ==
The following are common ways of advertising in social network games:

=== Banner advertisements ===
As banner ads within social networks tend to be where ad response is low, they tend to be priced at bottom-of-the-barrel CPMs of around $2. However, because social games generate so many page views, they are the biggest part of advertising revenue for the social gaming industry.

=== Video ads ===
Videos are the ad format with the most revenue per view. They tend to be higher-priced, either by CPMs ($35+ CPM in social games) or cost-per-completed-view. According to studies, video ads result in highest brand recall thus a good return on investment for advertisers. Video ads are shown either in in-game interstitials (e.g. when the game is loading a new screen) or through incentive-based advertising, i.e. you will get either an in-game reward or Facebook credits for watching an advertisement.

=== Product placement ===
A brand or product will be injected in a game in some way. Due to the variety of ways in which product placement can be accomplished in any media, and because the category is nascent, this category is not standardized at all, but some examples include branded in-game goods or even in-game quests. For example, in a game where you run a restaurant, you might be asked to collect ingredients to make a Starbucks Frappuccino, and receive in-game rewards for doing so. As these product placement deals are non-standard, they are largely charged with a production fee, which can be $350,000 to $750,000 depending on the type of placement and the popularity of the game.

=== Lead generation offers ===
Another form of advertising that is prevalent in many social games are lead generation offers. In this form of advertising, companies, usually from different industries, aim to convince players to sign up for their goods or services and in exchange, players will receive virtual gifts or advance in the game as a reward.

=== Sponsorship ===
==== White label games ====
Applications that are built once, then individualized and licensed again and again. Developer can create a quality app focused on fun while leaving the edges of the game open for branding. This allows developers to market their game to companies that can find new and interesting ways to bond with, expand, or sell to their audience.

== Social gaming as corporate promotion ==
Large established corporations are using social gaming to build brand awareness and engagement. The Walt Disney Company's Disney Animal Kingdom Explorers was developed to create awareness of Disney's theme parks and also promote conservation. The gameplay is divided evenly between two main elements, finding hidden object and large assortment of animals, and also includes simulation for players to build their own nature preserve. Players are expected to work with friends to collect the necessary materials to grow their habitat, while the hidden object element set players to compete for the highest score in their social setting.

Some large established video games developers are acquiring small operators to capitalize on the social gaming industry. The Walt Disney Company purchased social game developer Playdom for $763.0 million, and Electronic Arts purchased PopCap Games for $750.0 million in July 2011.

== Criticism ==
Cow Clicker, created by Ian Bogost, was developed to highlight social games' most exploitative and abusive aspects. The game requires users to click on a picture of a cow every 6 hours to earn points. It also prompts users to encourage friends to join in to help them gain more points. Cow Clicker was clearly designed to ridicule other social media games such as FarmVille, yet fifty-six thousand users played it at its peak. The community also evolved and spawned similar games, garnered critical reviews and even gained a strategy guide.

In a study by Bitdefender, it was shown that social games increase spam and phishing by 50 percent in social media platforms. This is made possible through hackers creating fake profiles and relying on bots to send spam messages to other users via social gaming applications. Many of these users who receive the messages willingly add the spammers' fake profiles into their circle of friends to depend on them for additional gaming support. In doing so, several users have become more prone to being victims of data, identity theft, account hijacking, and other issues. The spammer's action here, however, does not constitute as abuse since it is typically the user who adds the spammer on their end. As such, the spammer's account cannot be suspended by a social network.

Social networking gamers are also susceptible to unwanted charges. For instance, some of these games offer virtual currency if the player fills out a survey. After completing the survey, users are asked to type down their phone number, then wait for a text message that will give them a PIN to enter into a site and will finally give them their results. By entering the PIN into the site, they are subscribed to some service—such as ones that provide horoscope forecasts—are charged for it, and may not be aware of it unless they have carefully read the fine print.

Some critics have also claimed that social networking games have caused the numbers of fake profiles to rise. Creating a fake profile can be advantageous if the game, for example, offers rewards whenever a user introduces the game to their friends. By inviting the fake profile to play the game, the user can trick the games' point-based system into thinking that they are actually helping the game gain popularity and in return, they may receive rewards from the game. Social networking sites such as Facebook eliminates fake profiles if and only if these profiles are reported by other users.

One of the more popular genres to social games are those that imitate gambling activities which are free to play and easily accessible through a social network. However, the similarity these games have with gambling has also created a debate about whether or not social games need to be regulated. Several policymakers from various countries—Australia, Belgium, Spain, and the United Kingdom—have shown concern about the potential and negative impact these games could cause.
