= MLX =

MLX or mlx may refer to:

== Science and technology ==
- Millilux (mlx), an SI unit of illumination equal to 10^{−3} lux
- Megalux (Mlx), an SI unit of illumination equal to 10^{6} lux
- MLX (gene), a human gene encoding max-like protein X
- MLX (machine language entry software), software for entering binary data from magazines
- MLX (Apple ML framework), a software framework for Apple hardware

== Other uses ==
- Malatya Erhaç Airport (IATA Airport code), Turkey
- 1060 (Roman numerals: MLX)
