= Juice Cubes =

2013 video game

- Developer: Pocket PlayLab
- Publisher: Rovio Stars
- Platforms: Android, iOS, Facebook Platform, Fire OS
- Release: October 31, 2013

Juice Cubes is a match 3 puzzle video game developed by Pocket PlayLab and published by Rovio Stars, as its second game, for iOS and Android. It is also available as a Facebook app played via a web browser.

== Gameplay ==
The gameplay of Juice Cubes is to connect at least 3 fruits of the same color, while trying to finish certain goals, e.g. getting certain numbers of points or removing sand tiles from the grid. Whenever the player connects four or more cubes, a bomb fruit appears that can destroy fruits on a row or column when matched upon. When diagonally formed, it will create a bomb fruit that destroys fruit in a 3×3 area. When players connect 8 or more fruits, they create a fruit that removes from the grid the fruit of the same color the special fruit is connected with. As of April 2023, there are 910 levels.

Additional lives or in-game powerups may be purchased with real money.
