= Tempopo =

2025 video game

- Developer: Witch Beam
- Publisher: The Cult Games
- Composer: Jeff van Dyck
- Platforms: Windows, Mac, Linux, Xbox One, Xbox Series, Nintendo Switch
- Release: WW: 17 April 2025
- Genre: Puzzle
- Mode: Single-player

Tempopo is a 2025 video game developed by Australian independent developer Witch Beam and published by The Cult Games. It is a puzzle video game in which players must guide creatures named Tempopo to collect all flowers across a series of levels. The developers stated that the design of the game, inspired by earlier puzzle titles, including Lemmings, was intended to be relaxed and deconstruct the difficulty barriers intrinsic to puzzle titles. Upon release, Tempopo received generally positive reviews.

== Gameplay ==
Screenshot of gameplay in Tempopo.

Playing as Hana, a young girl who acts as a conductor, players must command a group of blobs named Tempopo across 60 levels to navigate and solve block-based puzzles to collect flowers in each level. Tempopo move forward in sync with the beat of the game's music, and prior to starting each level, players must place tiles that guide the Tempopo by changing their direction, crossing a gap, or allowing them to jump, to collect all the flowers and complete the course.

== Development ==
Tempopo was developed by Witch Beam, an Australian studio based in Brisbane who previously had created the puzzle title Unpacking. Director Sanatana Mishra stated that the game started as a collaboration with Journey animator Seiji Tanaka, who were inspired by the design of "evolutionary dead ends" of older puzzle titles such as Lemmings, ChuChu Rocket! and The Incredible Machine and making a "relaxing" and "accessible" version for a modern audience. Composer Jeff van Dyck created the soundtrack for the game, with its emphasis on music integrated closely with the gameplay to assist the player to "think in sync with the beat" when completing puzzles. Mishra stated that the theme of "harmony" was an "underlying element" of the game, with the design and sound of the game intended for players to "feel a sense of calm" and deconstruct the difficulty barriers traditionally associated with puzzle games.

The game was announced on 10 June 2024 at the PC Gamer PC Gaming Show 2024, with the release of a trailer. The game was released for Xbox consoles, the Nintendo Switch, and Steam on 17 April 2025.

== Reception ==
Reception

Aggregate scores
Aggregator	Score
Metacritic	88/100
OpenCritic	62% recommend

Review scores
Publication	Score
PC Gamer (US)	65%
Digitally Downloaded	5/5

Tempopo received "generally favorable" reviews, according to review aggregator Metacritic. Fellow review aggregator OpenCritic assessed that the game received strong approval, being recommended by 62% of critics.

At the Australian Game Developer Awards 2025, the game received awards for Excellence in Music and Excellence in Accessibility, and was also nominated for Excellence in Sound Design.
