= Arthur to Astaroth no Nazomakaimura: Incredible Toons =

1996 video game

- Developer: Magical Formation
- Publisher: Capcom
- Designer: Hideki Kamiya
- Series: The Incredible Machine; Ghosts 'n Goblins
- Platforms: PlayStation, Sega Saturn
- Release: JP: August 30, 1996
- Genre: Puzzle
- Mode: Single-player

Arthur to Astaroth no Nazomakaimura: Incredible Toons (Note: Arthur to Astaroth no Nazomakaimura: Incredible Toons (アーサーとアスタロトの謎魔界村 インクレディブルトゥーンズ) (lit. Arthur and Astaroth's Mysterious Demon World Village)) is a 1996 puzzle video game for the Sega Saturn and PlayStation which was only released in Japan. Capcom licensed Dynamix's Sid & Al's Incredible Toons engine with a Ghosts 'n Goblins motif.

== Gameplay ==
The game plays the same as the game The Incredible Machine. The player must solve puzzles in the form of constructing a Rube Goldberg-like machine to accomplish a given task.

== Development ==
The game was initially completed without the Ghosts 'n Goblins characters, which Capcom decided to add in at the last minute.

== Reception ==
Kurt Kalata of Hardcore Gaming 101 was critical of the game, referring to some of the puzzles as "a bit odd" or "cruel", concluding that "as a game, its pretty difficult and really only for the most diehard puzzle fanatics, but its an interesting curiosity for a Ghouls 'n Ghosts fan".
