= Small System Services =

Small System Services was an American publisher of computing books and magazines.

Small Systems Services was founded by Robert C. Lock in 1979 and had its headquarters in Greensboro, North Carolina. It published the popular monthly magazines COMPUTE! and COMPUTE!'s Gazette, as well as around a dozen books through its COMPUTE! Books subdivision.

In 1983 the company was acquired by American Broadcasting Company. It continued to operate as a division of ABC Publishing under the name COMPUTE! Publications. COMPUTE! Books remained a separate company from the magazine group.
