= RoomSync =

- Website type: Roommate matching service
- Owners: U-Match, LLC
- Website: roomsync.com
- Commercial: Yes
- Registration: Yes
- Launched: 2007
- Current status: Active

RoomSync, a product developed by U-Match, LLC, is an online roommate matching service based in Gainesville, Florida that works with student housing properties and on-campus housing offices. It is a Facebook-based application that allows users to self-select their roommates by researching potential roommates using their Facebook profiles and lifestyle questionnaire responses. By 2013, RoomSync had more than 100,000 users that utilized the application to choose their roommates.

== History ==
RoomSync was founded in August 2007 by Rob Castellucci, Alex Edelsburg, Michael Hacker, and Ariel Himmelstern. The idea for the company came about while Castellucci was working as a leasing consultant at a student housing complex in Gainesville, Florida. During this time, Castellucci received various calls for roommate switches due to students researching their matched roommates and not liking what they saw. It wasn’t until the launch of Facebook Platform in 2007 that RoomSync came to life with their first name of “RoomBug” as an application that could be hosted through Facebook. RoomSync started working with their first client, the University of Florida, in 2009.

In July 2010, the company changed its name from RoomBug to what it is known as today, RoomSync. In 2009, RoomSync was named one of the top 50 fbFund finalists. Facebook’s seed fund and mentorship program with Accel Partners and Founders Fund was established to help and enable talented developers and entrepreneurs to build sustainable businesses on Facebook.

== Features ==
RoomSync enables users to upload personal information to their RoomSync profile using the information that is already on a users Facebook profile plus a questionnaire that lets users share lifestyle habits such as cleanliness levels, studying habits, sleep cycles, and more.

In 2012, RoomSync started offering White-label product features to their clients that allows clients to apply their own identity/brand to the Facebook Application but is still fully supported and serviced by RoomSync. RoomSync offers access to its application on both computers or through an Android (operating system) mobile device. Users do not pay for the use of RoomSync since the general client such as a leasing office or university housing office pays this service fee.

== Controversy ==
In August 2010, The New York Times columnist Maureen Dowd wrote an article titled “Don’t Send In the Clones” where she challenged the self-selection process of roommates that is offered by RoomSync. Dowd argues that “the serendipity of ending up with roommates that you like, despite your differences, or can’t stand, despite your similarities, or grow to like, despite your reservations, is an experience that toughens you up and broadens you out for the rest of life.”

One RoomSync client school was concerned about the effect on diversity while using RoomSync for roommate matching. According to research done by the University of Florida, more than 85% of incoming freshmen submitted a roommate request via the UF housing portal with no adverse effect on ethnic diversity.

== News ==
In August 2010 Lisa W. Foderaro of The New York Times wrote “Roommates Who Click” where she discussed the events of a recent high school grad that found her New York University roommate using online websites such as Uroomsurf.com. Foderaro mentioned the use of RoomBug (now RoomSync) to find roommates and how RoomSync emphasized security. Lisa Foderaro mentions how “social networking sites such as Facebook have pressured colleges to cede control of the roommate process.”
