= Wild One =

Wild One, Wild Ones, The Wild One or The Wild Ones may refer to:

== Film ==
- The Wild One, 1953 film starring Marlon Brando
- The Wild One, a 2022 film based on the life of James Morrill, a mid-19th century British castaway in Australia
- The Wild Ones (film), 2012 Spanish film
- The Wild One (2023 film), a documentary on the Holocaust survivor and director Jack Garfein

== Literature ==
- Wild Ones (manga), a 2004 manga by Kiyo Fujiwara
- The Wild One (novel), a 1967 children's novel by Monica Edwards
- Wild Ones: A Sometimes Dismaying, Weirdly Reassuring Story About Looking at People Looking at Animals in America, a 2013 novel by Jon Mooallem

== Music ==
=== Albums ===
- Wild One (The Guess Who album), 1972
- Wild One: The Very Best of Thin Lizzy, a 1996 compilation album
- Wild One, a 2009 EP by Rooney
- The Wild One, a 2008 album by Sugarplum Fairy
- Wild Ones (Flo Rida album), a 2012 album by Flo Rida
- Wild Ones (Kip Moore album), a 2015 album by Kip Moore
- Wild Ones, a 2013 album by Black Prairie (written as accompaniment to the book by Jon Mooallem)
- The Wild Ones (album), a 1982 album by the Cockney Rejects

=== Songs ===
- "Wild One" (Bobby Rydell song), 1960
- "Wild One" (Faith Hill song), a 1993 country music song
- "Wild One" (Martha and the Vandellas song), 1964
- "Wild One" (Johnny O'Keefe song), 1958, also known as "Real Wild Child", later covered by Iggy Pop
- "Wild One" (Green Day song), a song by Green Day from the 2012 album ¡Dos!
- "Wild One", a song by Dio from the album Lock Up the Wolves
- "Wild One", a 2009 song by Rooney released on the EP Wild One
- "Wild One", a 2002 song by Darius Rucker from Back to Then
- "Wild One", a 1975 song by Thin Lizzy from Fighting
- "Wild One", a 2014 song by Nikki Lane from All or Nothin'
- "The Wild One", a 1974 song by Suzi Quatro from Quatro
- "Wild Ones" (Flo Rida song), 2011, featuring Sia
- "Wild Ones" (Jessie Murph and Jelly Roll song), 2023
- "The Wild Ones" (song), a 1994 song by Suede
- "The Wild Ones", a 1980 song by Status Quo from the album Just Supposin'
- "Den vilda" ("The wild one" in Swedish), a 1996 song by One More Time, and the Swedish entry in the 1996 Eurovision Song Contest

=== Performers ===
- The Wild Ones (American band), a 1960s rock group
- The Wild Ones (Burmese band)
- "The Wild One", a nickname for Johnny O'Keefe

== Other uses ==
- The Wild One (roller coaster), a wooden roller coaster at Six Flags America
- Wild Ones (organization), a not-for-profit educational organization that promotes environmentally sound landscaping practices
- Wild Ones (video game), a former video game by Playdom
