= Giorgi Tskhovrebadze =

Giorgi Tskhovrebadze may refer to:

- Giorgi Tskhovrebadze (businessman)
- Giorgi Tskhovrebadze (handballer)
