= Friends for Sale =

2007 video game

Friends For Sale
- Developers: Serious Business (Until February 2010); Zynga
- Platform: Facebook Platform
- Release: November 2007
- Genre: Business simulation game
- Mode: Multiplayer

Friends for Sale was a massively multiplayer online business simulation game originally developed by Serious Business, available as an application on the social networking website Facebook. The game allowed players to buy and sell virtual pets representing other players. Since its launching by November 2007, Friends for Sale soared into popularity by June 2008, becoming one of the top ten Facebook applications with around 700,000 daily users and activity peaked at around 6.5 million monthly users on 2 November 2009 until Zynga acquired Serious Business on 11 February 2010. Shortly after its acquisition by Zynga, Friends for Sale underwent another transition as it was subsequently sold to Lika Games Inc on September 27, 2010. Due to financial difficulties, Lika Games discontinued Friends for Sale on September 3, 2011.

== Gameplay ==
Players begin the game receiving some amount of virtual currency, as well as the in-game value of the pet that represents them. A list of the player's Facebook friends appears, along with their selling price. They could be bought; given nicknames and gifts; put to work with, locked from, sold to and used to poke other players.
