= The Automatic Proofreader =

Series of checksum utilities

The Automatic Proofreader is a series of checksum utilities published by COMPUTE! Publications for its COMPUTE! and COMPUTE!'s Gazette magazines and various books. These programs allow home computer users to detect errors when entering BASIC type-in programs. They display a checksum for each line which can be compared against the one printed in the magazine; if they are the same then the line was typed correctly.

The program was initially published for use with the Commodore 64 and VIC-20 in 1983., although no program listings used the Proofreader until it was later made available for the Atari 8-bit computers, Apple II, IBM PC, and PCjr the following year.

== Commodore versions ==
The Automatic Proofreader was first introduced in October 1983 for the Commodore 64 and VIC-20. This first version had separate versions for the VIC and 64; the following month, they were combined into a single listing designed to work on both systems. This version of the Proofreader would display a byte-sized numeric value at the top left corner of the screen whenever a program line was entered.

The initial version of the Proofreader, however, had several drawbacks. It was loaded into the cassette buffer (memory area), which was overwritten whenever a program was loaded or saved using the Datassette. This caused difficulties if a cassette user had to resume work on a partially completed listing. A complicated method had to be used to get both the Proofreader and the program listing in memory at the same time. Also, the checksum method used was relatively rudimentary, and did not catch transposition errors, nor did it take whitespace into account.

Because of this, the New Automatic Proofreader was introduced in February 1986. This version used a more sophisticated checksum algorithm that could catch transposition errors. It also took spaces into account if they were within quotes (where they were generally significant to the program's operation), while ignoring them outside of quotes (where they were not relevant). Also, the decimal display of the checksum was replaced by two letters.

The New Automatic Proofreader was designed to run on any Commodore 8-bit home computer (including the Commodore 16, Plus/4, and Commodore 128), automatically relocating itself to the bottom of BASIC RAM and moving pointers to hide its presence. It was continuously published until COMPUTE!'s Gazette switched over to a disk-only format after the December 1993 issue.
