= SpeedScript =

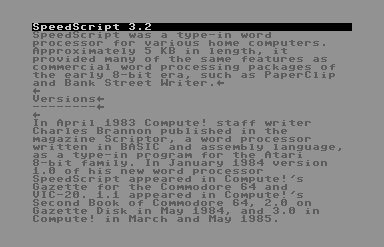
- version 3.2 on a Commodore 64
- Original author: Charles Brannon
- Developer: Compute! Publishing
- Release: January 1984; 42 years ago
- Stable release: 3.2 / May 1987; 39 years ago
- Written in: 6502 assembly language, Turbo Pascal (MS-DOS)
- Platform: VIC-20, Commodore 64 / 128, Apple II, Atari 8-bit, MS-DOS
- Type: Word processor

SpeedScript is a word processor originally printed as a type-in MLX machine language listing in 1984-85 issues of Compute! and Compute!'s Gazette magazines. Approximately 5 KB in length, it provides many of the same features as commercial word processing packages of the 8-bit era, such as PaperClip and Bank Street Writer. Versions were published for the Apple II, Commodore 64 and 128, Atari 8-bit computers, VIC-20, and MS-DOS. It was the most popular program ever published in the magazine, as well as the longest.

== Versions ==
In April 1983 Compute! published Scriptor, a word processor written by staff writer Charles Brannon in BASIC and assembly language, as a type-in program for the Atari 8-bit computers. In January 1984 version 1.0 of his new word processor SpeedScript appeared in Compute!'s Gazette for the Commodore 64 and VIC-20. 1.1 appeared in Compute!'s Second Book of Commodore 64, 2.0 on Gazette Disk in May 1984, and 3.0 in Compute! in March and April 1985. Corrections that updated 3.0 to 3.1 appeared in May 1985, and the full 3.1 version appeared in a book published by Compute!, SpeedScript: The Word Processor for the Commodore 64 and VIC-20.

POKEs for the VIC-20 and C64, to update 3.0 or 3.1 to 3.2, appeared in the December 1985 Compute! and the full 3.2 version was available on the January 1986 Compute! Disk. The POKEs for the 64 were also included in the full SpeedScript 3.2 article when it was reprinted in the May 1987 Compute!'s Gazette issue and the full program, plus three additional utilities, were available on the May 1987 Gazette Disk.

SpeedScript 3.2, alongside SpeedCalc, Fontmaker, and five other utility programs, was included in the special Best of COMPUTE! & GAZETTE disk/magazine in 1988.

The Reader's Feedback column in the January 1986 Compute! has POKEs to eliminate the DISK or TAPE? question. A typo in the listing was corrected in the March 1986 CAPUTE! column.

Ports of V3 for the Atari 8-bit computers and the Apple II were printed in Compute! in May and June 1985 respectively. SpeedScript was written entirely in assembly language, and Compute! Publications later released book/disk combinations that contained the complete commented source code (as well as the machine language in MLX format) for each platform.

A version of SpeedScript for MS-DOS was created in 1988 by Randy Thompson and published in book form by Compute! Books. This version was written in Turbo Pascal with portions written in assembly language, and added incremental new features to the word processor such as additional printer commands, full cursor-control (to take advantage of the PC's Home, End, PgUp, and PgDn keys), and a native 80-column mode.

== 80-column updates ==
The original versions of SpeedScript were designed for the 40-column Commodore 64 and the 22-column VIC-20. When the Commodore 128 was released, featuring an 80-column display, many users requested an updated version of SpeedScript to take advantage of this new capability. In June 1986, Compute!'s Gazette published SpeedScript-80, a short patch for SpeedScript 3.0 or higher, which enabled the use of the VDC's new 80-column capabilities on a Commodore 128 running in 64 mode. However, this did not take advantage of the C128's expanded memory, and a few minor commands were eliminated due to the alterations to the existing code.

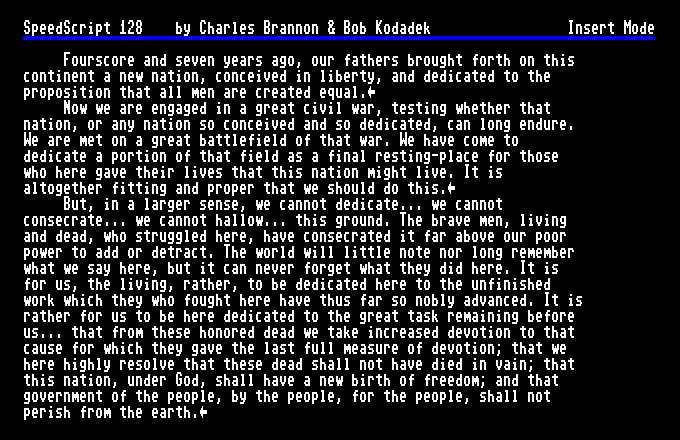
SpeedScript 128

A native version for the C128 called SpeedScript 128, written by Bob Kodadek, was released in October 1987 Compute!'s Gazette. This version eliminated the problems of the patch and supports the C128's 80-column screen, its expanded memory and the enhanced keyboard. A later update (SS128-Plus) appeared in September 1989 Compute!'s Gazette, adding full text justification, tab setting, and online help.

In December 1987, Compute!'s Gazette published Instant 80, a utility for the C64 version of SpeedScript that allowed 80-column document previewing (though not editing) on a standard C64. This is done by using half-width characters on a high-resolution graphics screen.

== Utilities ==
Although SpeedScript did not include a built-in spell checker, additional utilities were soon published. In December 1985, SpeedCheck was published in Compute!'s Gazette. This external utility accepts SpeedScript files (as well as those from compatible word processors, such as PaperClip) and spell-checked them against a user-defined dictionary. An enhanced 80-column version for the C128, SpeedCheck 128, was published in September 1988.

Another utility, ScriptSave, was developed to provide automatic saving functionality to the Commodore 64 version of SpeedScript 3.0. This program creates a timer program to save documents to disk, before loading and running SpeedScript itself.

Several additional utilities were published in the May 1987 issue of Compute!'s Gazette along with SpeedScript 3.2. ScriptRead was developed to identify and preview SpeedScript documents on a disk, with the ability to scratch any files no longer needed. This was an important addition as on a single-drive system there would be no way to save work if the disk became full. SpeedSearch provides full-text search of all SpeedScript documents on a disk, returning a count of how many times the searched word or phrase was used in each document. Date and Time Stamper introduces a program to the disk drive that adds time stamps to files on disk, then executes SpeedScript.

== SpeedCalc ==
SpeedCalc is a spreadsheet program that first appeared in the January 1986 issue of Compute! and offers basic spreadsheet functionality. Like SpeedScript, it is a very long program. It was published for the Commodore 64, 128, Apple II and Atari 8 bit computers.

== Reception ==
In a review of four word processors, The Transactor in May 1986 praised SpeedScript as "extremely sophisticated", citing its large text buffer, logical cursor navigation, and undo command. While criticizing its lack of right justification, the magazine concluded that SpeedScript was not only "an easy winner" among budget-priced word processors, but also "a serious contender even when compared with the higher priced programs".

SpeedScript was sufficiently popular to receive coverage in reference works, such as the "Wordprocessing Reference Guide" of Karl Hildon's Inner Space Anthology and Mitchell Waite's The Official Book for the Commodore 128. Columbia University's Kermit software for Commodore computers supports transferring SpeedScript files.

== Gallery ==
SpeedScript 3.0 for the VIC-20

SpeedScript 3.0 for the Atari 8-bit computers
