= MLX (machine language entry software) =

Software for entering binary data from magazines

MLX is a series of machine language entry utilities published by the magazines COMPUTE! and COMPUTE!'s Gazette, as well as books from COMPUTE! Publications. These programs are designed to allow relatively easy entry of the type-in machine language listings often included in these publications. Versions are available for the Commodore 64, VIC-20, Atari 8-bit computers, and Apple II. MLX listings were reserved for programs written entirely in assembly, without combining Basic, like SpeedScript, a word processor.

== First version ==
Part of an MLX type-in program from COMPUTE!'s Gazette

MLX was introduced in the December 1983 issue of COMPUTE! for the Commodore 64 and Atari 8-bit computers alongside the December 1983 COMPUTE!'s Gazette for the Commodore 64. This was followed by a version for the VIC-20 with 8K expansion, in the January 1984 issue of COMPUTE!'s Gazette and by Tiny MLX, in the March 1984 Gazette issue for the unexpanded VIC-20 to type in the game CUT-OFF!. These use a format consisting of six data bytes in decimal format, and a seventh as a checksum. The program auto-increments the address and prints the comma delimiters every three characters. Invalid keystrokes are automatically deleted, and if the last three characters are invalid, the entire line has to be typed again. Tiny MLX was written for use on unexpanded VIC machines, although a consequence of this is that the user can't save and continue typing at another time, they have to type the entire listing in one sitting. The program is written in Basic and when it is started the user types in the starting and ending memory addresses of the assembly programs specified in the magazine that the user wants to type in.

In the Commodore 64 version, beginning in the May 1984 issue of COMPUTE!, several keyboard keys were redefined to create a makeshift numeric keypad and this keypad was added to the Gazette version in July 1984.

== Improved version ==
A new version of MLX was introduced for the Apple II in the June 1985 issue. This version uses an 8-byte-per-line hexadecimal format. A more sophisticated algorithm was implemented to catch errors overlooked by the original.

The improved features were then backported to the Commodore 64. The new version, known on the title screen as "MLX II", but otherwise simply as "the new MLX", appeared in the December 1985 issue of COMPUTE! It was printed in COMPUTE!'s Gazette the following month. This version of MLX was used until COMPUTE!'s Gazette switched to a disk-only format in December 1993. MLX listings from this date onwards requires this new version of MLX.

MLX 128 arrived in the August 1986 Gazette and the March 1987 Compute!, using the same hex format as the new Apple II version.

== See also ==
- The Automatic Proofreader – COMPUTE!'s checksum utility for BASIC programs
