= Mob Wars =

2008 social media video game

- Developer: David Maestri
- Publisher: Kano/Apps
- Platform: Facebook Platform
- Release: 2008
- Genre: MMORPG

Mob Wars is a multiplayer role-playing game hosted on the social networking site Facebook. It allows players to engage in Mafia-style wars with one another and has become one of the most lucrative Facebook applications and the first to net US$1M per month in revenue. However, this number has never been confirmed by the developer or any third parties.

Developed by David Maestri while he worked for Freewebs.com, it was subsequently the subject of an unsuccessful intellectual property lawsuit as Maestri's former employers attempted to claim ownership over the asset. The lawsuit was ultimately settled in December 2008 with the IP for Mob Wars remaining with Maestri but with SGN allowed to develop their own Mafia based role-playing application. In August 2008, Mob Wars had 2.5 million active users. It has spawned several very similar games with nearly identical gameplay and format on both Facebook and MySpace, some of which, such as Zynga's Mafia Wars, were the subject of further lawsuits. Zynga made some changes to Mafia Wars so it wouldn't resemble Mob Wars as closely, but Mob Wars creator David Maestri moved forward with his lawsuit. In September 2009, Maestri and Zynga settled the case for about $7–$9 million, less than the $10 million Maestri had originally demanded.

== Gameplay ==
Mob Wars is a simple role-playing game. There is no world for the player to move around in. The only type of character interaction the player experiences with other players, is either by sending them messages, weapons, and energy boosts, or attacking them. Like many Facebook applications, most of the gameplay revolves around having friends of the player join the player's mob through means made possible in the game.

The player starts off as a petty thief and works his way up to doing bigger and better paying jobs and heists. The player gains strength by equipping his mob with weapons, armor and vehicles. These can be drops from doing jobs and heists, gifts from friends, or they can be purchased with game money (earned by doing jobs, fighting other players, or as income from investments in properties.)

Favor Points (sub-currency also known as Godfather points) can be used to heal or gain more game money. They are slowly earned as the player levels up or can be gained quickly by participating in sponsor surveys or off-site membership purchases with a credit card.

Soon after the development of the game, alliances were formed by many players, to promote levelling and to organize group attacks, and to protect against those same tactics. Some families were more organized than others and these alliances would range from only a few players to hundreds. Eventually the game itself evolved to promote the family aspect of the game, giving each player's character the option of either staying on their own, creating their own family or joining another family. If the respective character is a member of an in-game family, they would be "tagged" with the family name, which would link to the family page, listing all of the mobsters in that respective family. Many of the original families created in-game family alternatives, but since they were limited to 50 members per family the groups lost many members to other newcomers. In 2012 the Family aspect of the game was improved to include a win–loss percentage in Wars.
