= Quarky & Quaysoo's Turbo Science =

1992 video game

- Cover art
- Developer(s): Jeff Tunnell Productions
- Publisher(s): Sierra On-Line
- Platform(s): MS-DOS
- Release: 1992
- Genre(s): Educational game
- Mode(s): Single player

Quarky & Quaysoo's Turbo Science is an educational computer game developed by Jeff Tunnell Productions and published by Sierra On-Line for MS-DOS in early 1992. It was designed to teach scientific concepts to children.

The game centers on Quarky and Quaysoo O'Gandi, two space "elfs" that are green and yellow respectively. With the help of the player they race through a town in vehicles ranging from cars to jet packs. To purchase vehicles, the player answers questions relating to science at stops along the way. Each stop has a theme: the construction site is simple machines, Clown College is chemistry, etc. There are three opposing teams: two tough street fighters, a pair of alien siblings, and a know-it-all named Odessa King. The game also featured an information book that ran over one-hundred pages long and taught science topics such as optics (via a run-in with the light police) and energy (with the help of Sheik Oil Slick).

== Reception ==
Quarky & Quaysoo's Turbo Science was reviewed in the Oppenheim Toy Portfolio Guide Book where it was described as a set of "fun science problems". Noting that the problems orient toward "energy, chemistry, magnetism, and air and water pressure", the authors assessed the game as best suited for children aged 9 years and older.
