= Social City =

2010 video game

- Developers: PushButton Labs, Playdom Eugene
- Publisher: Playdom
- Designers: Jeff Tunnell; Dan Yue; Alex Swanson
- Platforms: Internet, iPhone, Facebook
- Release: March, 2010 - Facebook April 20, 2010 - iPhone
- Genres: City-building, Simulation
- Mode: Single-player with multiplayer interaction

Social City was a real-time city-building simulation game developed in association with American studio PushButton Labs and published by Playdom. Social City was released as an application for Facebook and the iPhone. The iPhone version was developed by Playdom in their Mountain View, CA office.

In 2010, Social City won the first ever "Best Social Network Game" award presented at GDC Online. In addition, it was ranked the #2 Facebook game available in 2010 by Inside Social Games. City of Wonder, another city-building game built upon the same PushButton Engine and also developed by Playdom was named the #1 Facebook game available in 2010 by Inside Social Games.

Social City had around 5.7 Million monthly active users on Facebook as of September 2010 however this number has been as high as nearly 13 Million monthly active users.

== Gameplay ==
The core genre of Social City is city building where players build their own cities with a range of buildings ranging from leisure (which makes citizens happy), factory (which produce goods for money) and residential buildings (which the player can "move" citizens into to increase their cities population. The player must balance population growth with leisure in order to move in more citizens.

=== Newspaper ===
The game gives your city a newspaper which will be called The (Name of City) Gazette. The news paper comes in 3 parts, Part A, B and C. At the top of each page, there is the date and what edition the paper it is (Morning, Afternoon or Evening).

==== Part A ====
Part A (The Front Page) has ‘’Real Estate’’ which is new buildings or limited edition buildings. It also has Neighbour events and an advertising box, which has adverts to other Playdom Games and things that are coming soon.

==== Part B ====
Part B (The City Planner) is just 2 lists, one with goals and one with achievements.

==== Part C ====
Part C (Financial News) shows your ‘’Daily Bonus’’ and has the ‘’Collect all 8’’ feature. It also may have an advert for ‘’Citybucks’’

=== Currency ===
The game uses two different currency systems; "Coins" which can be earned by cleaning buildings and collecting goods from factories - and "City Bucks" which can be bought with real money or obtained by completing surveys for the purchase of additional game items and upgrades.

=== Neighbours ===
Much in the way of other Facebook applications, Social City relies heavily on the player adding neighbours. This is required for players to expand their city size without the use of City Bucks; though there is the option of buying expansions with City Bucks.

== Discontinuation ==
In November 2011, it was announced that Social City would be discontinued on 20 December 2011.
