= Bouncers (video game) =

1994 video game

- Developer: Dynamix
- Publisher: Sega
- Designers: Rhett Anderson; Dave Hensley; Tim Midkiff; Randy Thompson
- Artist: John Garvin
- Composers: Christopher Stevens; Timothy Clark
- Platform: Sega CD
- Release: NA: December 1994
- Genre: Sports
- Modes: Single-player, multiplayer

Bouncers is a sports video game developed by Dynamix and published by Sega for the Sega CD in December 1994.

== Gameplay ==
Bouncers is a combination fighting game and basketball game, with the player as the ball.

== Development and release ==
Bouncers was developed by American studio Dynamix. Designers included Rhett Anderson, Dave Hensley, Randy Thompson and Tim Midkiff. Anderson and Hensley previously wrote the one-on-one sports game Basketball Sam & Ed as a type-in program for their magazine Compute!'s Gazette in July 1987. In 1988, the duo wrote the similar Arcade Volleyball for Commodore 64 which Thompson and Midkiff promptly ported to the Amiga. Bouncers features art and cartoon cutscenes created by John Garvin, who later went on the become a lead designer and creative director on the Syphon Filter series. Voice acting in Bouncers was performed by Michael Bell, Mark Hamill, and John Kassir. The game was released by Sega exclusively for the North American Sega CD in December 1994. Christopher Stevens and Timothy Steven Clarke contributed to the music and sound effects. Stevens and Clarke left Dynamix shortly before the game was released to establish LoudMouth, Inc., a game music production company. Tracks from Bouncers were included on the group's 1995 album Get Loud! vol. 1 alongside selections from other Dynamix titles.

== Reception ==
Reception

Review scores
Publication	Score
Electronic Gaming Monthly	6/10
Game Players	81%
GamePro	4.25/5
Next Generation	3/5
Gamers (BR)	3.2/5
.Super GamePower	3.8/5
VideoGames	6/10

Next Generation reviewed the game, rating it three stars out of five, and stated that "It's goofy as hell, and a complete blast. However, it's such an odd concept for a game that it seems you either love it or hate it. Fortunately, we liked it."
