= The Incredible Machine 2 =

1994 video game

- Developer: Jeff Tunnell Productions
- Publisher: Sierra On-Line
- Composers: Tim Clarke; Christopher Stevens
- Series: The Incredible Machine
- Platforms: MS-DOS, Classic Mac OS, Windows
- Release: 1994: MS-DOS; 1995: Mac, Windows
- Genre: Puzzle
- Modes: Single-player, multiplayer

The Incredible Machine 2 is a puzzle video game published for MS-DOS in 1994 by Sierra On-Line. It is part of The Incredible Machine video game series. An enhanced version was released in 1995 for Classic Mac OS and Windows as The Incredible Machine Version 3.0 (also marketed as Professor Tim's Incredible Machines). Both games have the same levels; Version 3 has an improved interface, CD music tracks, and other additions. Re-releases of the series, including the 2009 compilation The Incredible Machine Mega Pack, have included Version 3.0.

== Gameplay ==
The Incredible Machine 2 introduced new levels, an extended assortment of parts, a new interface, significantly improved graphics, sounds, and music, and two player hotseat play. It also improved on the "freeform" mode, allowing players to create completely playable puzzles by defining not only the participating parts, but also the set of circumstances under which the puzzle will be considered "solved". In terms of gameplay, this version provided the biggest addition to the series, while subsequent updates were basically only ports of the game to newer operating systems with updated graphics/sounds and sometimes new puzzles, but no new parts.

== Reception ==
Reception

Review score
Publication	Score
PC Magazine	4/4

Reviewing The Incredible Machine 2, Gary Meredith of PC Gamer US wrote: "In every way, TIM2 is an improvement, keeping the best parts of the original yet giving the player more options and flexibility". He summarized it as "a game that's as rewarding as it is challenging". The Incredible Machine 2 won Computer Gaming World's Readers' Choice award for the best "Classics/Puzzles" game of 1995, although it was not among the editors' nominees.
