= Happy Farm =

2008 video game

- Developer: 5 Minutes
- Publisher: 5 Minutes
- Platforms: Microsoft Windows, Mac OS X
- Release: November 2008
- Genres: Farm management, MMORPG, social network game
- Mode: Multiplayer online

Happy Farm was a social network game and massively multiplayer online game based on farm management simulation. It was played predominantly by users in Mainland China and Taiwan, and was the most popular in terms of players; At the height of its popularity, there were 23 million daily active users, logging on to the game at least every 24 hours.

Happy Farm was developed by Chinese social game developer 5 Minutes. Its development was complete in May 2008, testing was complete in July the same year, and the game was released in late 2008. It allows players to grow crops, trade with others, sell produce, and steal from neighbors. The game was influenced by the Japanese RPG series Story of Seasons.

Happy Farm was discontinued on September 25, 2017.

== Reception ==
At the height of its popularity, there were 23 million daily active users, logging on to the game at least every 24 hours. Approximately 15 million urban white-collar workers were estimated to have spent more than five hours a day on Happy Farm. Because of its popularity, the game's host, Tencent QQ, capped the number of new players per day at 2 million.

A number of later games have used similar game mechanics, such as Sunshine Farm, Happy Farmer, Happy Fishpond, and Happy Pig Farm. Happy Farm went on to inspire many more farming social network games, including FarmVille, Farm Town, Country Story, Barn Buddy, Sunshine Ranch, and Happy Harvest, as well as parodies such as Jungle Extreme and Farm Villain. Wired included Happy Farm in its list of "The 15 Most Influential Games of the Decade" at #14, for its major influence on social network gaming, particularly for having "inspired a dozen Facebook clones," the largest being Zynga's FarmVille. In 2009, Harvest Moon developers Marvelous Entertainment eventually released their own farming social network game, Bokujo Monogatari, for the Japanese site Mixi.

== See also ==
- FarmVille
- Story of Seasons series
- List of massively multiplayer online games
