= Lazer Maze =

1982 video game

- Publisher: Avant-Garde Creations
- Designer: James D. Spain
- Platforms: Apple II, Atari 8-bit, Commodore 64, VIC-20, TI-99/4A
- Release: 1982
- Genre: Turn-based strategy

Lazer Maze is a 1982 turn-based strategy video game written by James D. Spain and published by Avant-Garde Creations.

== Gameplay ==
Lazer Maze is a game in which two futuristic warriors from enemy sides engage in one-on-one combat.

== Reception ==
Stanley Greenlaw reviewed the game for Computer Gaming World, and stated that "LM is a different kind of game and for that reason alone is worth looking at. It is a worthy addition to the arcade game field."
