= Playdom =

Defunct online social network game developer

Playdom, Inc.
- Type: Subsidiary
- Industry: video games, social network service
- Founded: December 6, 2008; 17 years ago
- Founders: Dan Yue; Chris Wang; Ling Xiao
- Defunct: September 1, 2016; 10 years ago
- Fate: Closure, absorbed into Disney Interactive
- Headquarters: Palo Alto, California, U.S.
- Key people: John Pleasants (former CEO, resigned from Disney, November 2013); David Sobeski (former CTO, left Disney, December 2013); Christa Quarles (CFO, left Disney May 2014); Brad Serwin (former COO, left Disney, March 2012)
- Parent: Disney Interactive Studios (2010–2016)

Playdom, Inc. was an online social network game developer popular on Facebook, Google+ and Myspace. The company was founded in the San Francisco Bay Area by University of California, Berkeley graduates Ling Xiao and Chris Wang and Swarthmore College graduate Dan Yue. In 2009, the market for games played on social networking sites was valued at $300 million, consisting mostly of online sales of virtual goods.

It was a wholly owned subsidiary of Disney Interactive, itself a division of The Walt Disney Company. On September 1, 2016, Disney announced the closure of the remaining Playdom games, Marvel: Avengers Alliance and its mobile sequel at the end of the month, effectively shuttering the studio.

== History ==
On November 12, 2009, Playdom acquired Green Patch and Trippert Labs. In September 2009, competitor Zynga initiated a trade secrets lawsuits against Playdom and 22 other rivals, including Green Patch. These lawsuits were finally settled in November 2010, less than four months after Disney's acquisition of Playdom in July 2010.

On March 31, 2010, Playdom announced the acquisition of Argentina-based online game developer Three Melons for an undisclosed amount. In April 2010, Playdom closed all but one of the games from the Green Patch studio six months post-acquisition. On April 26, 2010, Playdom announced the acquisition of Merscom, a North Carolina–based social game developer. On May 19, 2010, they acquired Acclaim Games. On June 7, 2010, Playdom announced the acquisition of gaming developer Hive7 after a $33 million funding round. This marked Playdom's sixth acquisition over the prior year. On July 8, 2010, Playdom announced it acquired Metaplace, Inc. The pricing of the deal was not disclosed.

On July 27, 2010, The Walt Disney Company acquired Playdom in a $763 million deal. Disney initially paid $563 million for Playdom, which was the No. 3 social game company with about 42 million monthly players at the time of the acquisition. The deal also included a further $200 million in additional payments if Playdom achieves certain growth thresholds.

In May 2011, Playdom has been ordered by the Federal Trade Commission to pay $3 million in fines for collecting and disclosing children's information without parental approval.

In April 2014, Playdom announced the closure of all online games on the Playdom site, including Gardens of Time, Marvel: Avengers Alliance, Kitchen Scramble, Pirates of the Caribbean: Isles of War, Ghosts of Mistwood, Disney City Girl, and Disney Words of Wonder. The games closed on April 25, 2014. RockYou acquired the Facebook games Gardens of Time, Words of Wonder, and Disney City Girl (renamed to City Girl Life).

On September 1, 2016, Disney Interactive Media Group announced the end of Marvel: Avengers Alliance and its mobile-only sequel, Marvel: Avengers Alliance 2, bringing a close to the studio.

== Games ==
Gardens of Time was the most successful Facebook game created by Playdom, with a peak of 17 million monthly active users and 4 million daily active users.

=== Sold games ===
The following games were sold to RockYou between April and October 2014.

- Disney City Girl (now renamed "City Girl Life")
- Disney Words of Wonder (now renamed "Words of Wonder")
- Gardens of Time
- Kitchen Scramble

=== Discontinued games ===
- Guardians of the Galaxy: The Universal Weapon (GotG)
- Social City – A casual strategy game in which the player develops a city. Social City won the 2010 Game Developers Choice Online Award for Best Social Network Game. Inside Social Games rated Social City as the #2 Best Facebook Game of the first half of 2010. Social City also received an honorable mention on Gamasutra's list of the Top 5 Facebook Social Games in 2010. Gamezebo rated Social City at 3.5 out of 5, highlighting balanced gameplay and "adorable" graphics. However, it was criticized for its lack of complexity: "Once you’ve mastered the game’s ecosystem of manufacturing/residential/leisure, all you’ll be doing is visiting your town to keep this balance in check and grow your city. Growing your city remains exciting throughout, but by the time you hit level 15 or so you just start wishing there was something more." Social City was closed on December 20, 2011.
- Armies of Magic
- Big City Life
- Blackwood & Bell Mysteries
- Bloodlines
- Bola
- Botkin's Hidden Cove
- City of Wonder
- Deep Realms
- Disney Animal Kingdom Explorers
- Disney Dream Kingdom
- Disney Ghosts of Mistwood
- Disney Gnome Town
- Disney Hidden Worlds
- Disney Club Penguin: Card-Jitsu Snow
- ESPNU College Town
- ESPN Return Man
- ESPN Sports Bar & Grill
- Fanglies
- Fish Friends
- Full Bloom
- The Incredible Machine
- (Lil) Farm Life
- (Lil) Green Patch
- Market Street
- Marvel: Avengers Alliance
- Marvel: Avengers Alliance 2
- Marvel: Avengers Alliance Tactics
- Mobsters – Facebook
- Mobsters – MySpace
- Mobsters: Overdrive
- Mobsters 2: Vendetta
- Mobsters: Criminal Empire
- My Vineyard
- NBA Dynasty
- Pet Resort
- Pirates of the Caribbean: Isles of War
- Poker Palace
- ScribbleMix
- Sorority Life
- Star Wars Commander
- Threads of Mystery
- Tiki Farm
- Tiki Resort
- Treetopia
- Verdonia
- Wild Ones
