= Return of the Incredible Machine: Contraptions =

2000 video game

- Developer: Dynamix
- Publisher: Sierra On-Line
- Producer: Randy Thompson
- Designer: Brian Hahn
- Programmer: Richard Rayl
- Artist: Brian Hahn
- Composers: Christopher Stevens; Timothy Steven Clarke; Sage Freeman
- Series: The Incredible Machine
- Platforms: Mac OS, Windows
- Release: 2000
- Genre: Puzzle
- Mode: Single-player

Return of the Incredible Machine: Contraptions is a video game released in 2000, part of The Incredible Machine video game series.

The Incredible Machine: Even More Contraptions is an expansion pack released in 2001. It started a service allowing players to share their homemade puzzles using a service called "WonSwap". Even More Contraptions also came with a Palm Pilot version of the game that contained its own unique set of parts and puzzles suited for a small screen.

== Gameplay ==
As a full 32-bit Windows 95 game, Contraptions has new 800x600 resolution graphics. Although Contraptions has 250 levels, a few of them are new levels, the majority of them are levels from The Incredible Machine 2.

== Reception ==
Reception

Review scores
Publication	Score
GameSpot	8.1/10
IGN	8.4/10

GameSpot's Trey Walker said: "The problems in the game are only minor, and they do not detract from the overall experience and the high quality of the puzzles. Return of the Incredible Machine will certainly appeal to amateur inventors and players who are familiar with Rube Goldberg's work, and anyone who appreciates good old-fashioned puzzles will find plenty to enjoy in the game."

IGN's Martin Reyes said: "Return of the Incredible Machine is a vintage blend of educational and entertainment software at their finest."
