= Mafia Wars =

2009 video game

- Developer: Zynga
- Publisher: Zynga
- Platforms: PC; Mac OS; iPhone; mobile phone; miscellaneous internet-connected device
- Genres: Role-playing; casual

Mafia Wars is a defunct freemium multiplayer social network game created by Zynga. Players assume the roles of gangsters while building their own Mafia-type organization. The players fight and "rob" other players online-completing jobs, missions, and operations while gaining rewards and strength in an endless game. Mafia Wars won the 2009 Webby Award People's Voice Winner in the games category.

A sequel, Mafia Wars 2, was released in October 2011 and was shut down on December 30, 2012. On April 5, 2016, it was announced via Zynga's forums that Mafia Wars would close down on June 6, 2016. Players were informed via an in-game message. The game was taken offline shortly past midnight PDT on June 7, 2016. The game was relaunched on mobile in April 2017 for selected markets, featuring revamped mechanics. In July 2017, Zynga announced that all future work on the game was canceled and the game was discontinued.

== Gameplay ==
A screenshot of the first New York job tier on an older version of Mafia Wars running on Facebook

Mafia Wars is set with a choice of playing in New York City or Chicago with the option for players to travel to other locations including London, South Africa, and Mexico. Other locations were formerly available. The game revolved around fighting and robbing other players, doing jobs, and performing missions and operations to earn cash, building parts, weapons, attack and defense fighting skills, and experience, to establish and advance one's criminal empire. Players created mafias by recruiting other players or winning or buying artificial members (Hired Guns). Other players could be added to one's mafia through Facebook.

Gameplay was limited by three measurements: Energy, used for completing jobs, as well as Stamina and Health, which were used for fighting or robbing other players. The first two meters slowly recharged over time or filled up when experience was gained from leveling up. Fighting other players sometimes resulted in the theft of cash, the "killing" of the player attacked, or random gifts of loot (weapons, building parts, or consumable job supplies). Outcomes of an attack or attempt to rob were calculated by a formula which took into account the respective player's fighting skill, the number and quality of five kinds of weapons (weapons, armory, vehicles, animals, and henchmen), and a randomizing factor. When a player won an attack, they did damage to the victim's Health and suffered a loss of Health to their character.

== Platforms ==
Mafia Wars was released as an iOS app on April 8, 2009. Mafia Wars was available on Facebook, MySpace, Bebo, Yahoo!, and as a Google Chrome app. On Facebook, Mafia Wars had as many as 45.5 million monthly accounts created.

Mafia Wars was renamed Mafia Wars Classic in 2011. Mafia Wars Classic was shut down in 2012.

== Mafia Wars Shakedown ==
Mafia Wars Shakedown was launched as a stand-alone game, unconnected from the Facebook game, on November 15, 2011. That was an iOS exclusive. Mafia Wars Shakedown was shut down on December 30, 2012, and removed from the Apple app store.

== Lawsuit ==
The makers of a similar online game, Mob Wars, sued Zynga over their launch of Mafia Wars, accusing Zynga of copyright infringement. Zynga made some changes to Mafia Wars so it did not resemble Mob Wars as closely, but Mob Wars creator David Maestri moved forward with his lawsuit. In September 2009, Maestri and Zynga settled the case for about $7–9 million—less than the $10 million which Maestri had originally demanded.

== Trademark disputes ==
Zynga filed its trademark for the stylized version of Mafia Wars with the U.S. Patent and Trademark Office on July 1, 2009, months after it first launched the Mafia Wars game on the internet through Facebook. The Zynga trademark application for Mafia Wars sought to cover games for computers and wireless devices. Two weeks prior to the Zynga filing, on June 15, 2009, David L. Kelejian filed an intent-to-use trademark application for a stylized version of Mafia Wars which covered clothing and apparel. Zynga later began selling Mafia Wars branded clothing through Zazzle. By or before late November 2009, Zynga noticed Kelejian's pending trademark application for Mafia Wars and filed a trademark opposition proceeding against Kelejian's trademark on December 1, 2009.

In August 2010, Digital Chocolate sued Zynga over allegations that Zynga falsely claimed it had coined the Mafia Wars trademark. Digital Chocolate had previously created a cell-phone game by the same name. According to TGDaily, Zynga agreed to stop using the "Mafia Wars" trademark but failed to follow through until 2016.

== Advertising ==
A promotional campaign for Mafia Wars occurred in San Francisco in August 2010. Davis Elen Advertising ran the campaign, which consisted of fake $25,000 bills glued to the sidewalk promoting "Mafia Wars: Las Vegas". Deputy City Attorney Alex Tse called the campaign "illegal and actionable". Davis Elen took full responsibility for the promotion and agreed to pay a settlement of $45,000 to the city.

== Charity ==
After the 2010 Haiti earthquake, Zynga issued a special item for three of its games, including the Haitian Drum in Mafia Wars. The proceeds of the sale of the three items went to the Haiti Relief Fund, which exceeded $1.2 million. Additionally, Zynga released some items in the marketplace after Hurricane Irene.

== Movie and series advertising ==
- Public Enemies had a loot drop and limited time job to advertise the film going to Blu-ray and DVD. Players were able to watch video clips from the film and get items such as Purvis' rifle, Dillinger's pistols, Locket of Billie, a Public Enemies newspaper, a fur coat, and prison stripes. (A previously released Wooden Gun was re-released.) Mastering the limited time job would give you Dillinger's sunglasses. Two items went on sale for in-game currency: Dillinger's Overcoat and a stolen police car.
- Scarface had a loot sale in which players were able to acquire "A deal gone bad" (chainsaw), "Tony Montana's suit" (White vest and red shirt), a tiger, and "My Little Friend."
- Carlito's Way also made a deal to have items appear in Mafia Wars: "Carlito's Way" (a switchblade), Kleinfeld's boat, Benny Blanco and Carlito's jacket.
- Miami Vice had a promotion: Sonny's Suit, Go Fast Boat (a speed boat), Rico's Revenge (a gun) and Miami Vice (a car).
- Southland had a small promotion: players were able to send Southlander (a shotgun) to other players. There was also a promotion image that led to the Southland Facebook fan page for a trailer of the next season of Southland starting in January 2011.
- The Green Hornet also had a promotion. Objects such as the double-barreled gun, "Kato's Bike" and the "Black Beauty" were available.
- The Fast & Furious series had vehicles included, all under fictional names. The vehicles were the Ford Torino (named the Fénix GT) from the fourth film, Brian's Subaru (O'Connor's Euro Car) from the fourth film, Dom's Dodge Charger (named Dom's Supercharger) and Roman's Eclipse Spyder (named Roman's violet Spider).
