= (Lil) Green Patch =

Facebook application

(Lil) Green Patch was a Facebook application developed by Ashish Dixit and David King that simulated a small garden on a Facebook user's profile. By tending their and their friends' gardens, the Facebook users were able to raise money for The Nature Conservancy to save the rainforest. In September 2008, it was rated as the number one application on Facebook, ahead of Texas HoldEm Poker. In April 2009, it had slid to a sixth-place ranking.

(Lil) Green Patch became unavailable to users on June 10, 2010, following a decision by new owners Playdom to discontinue the application.

== Popularity and area of rainforest saved ==
In the first quarter of 2008, (Lil) Green Patch users raised over $15,000 in donations, which was enough to save more than 13,600,000 square feet (1.26 km^{2}) of rainforest. The application was then among the 15 most popular Facebook applications, with 350,000 active users. In June 2008, it was one of the top ten most installed applications, with more than 5,217,180 installations and 521,718 active users a day. By October 2008, the app had raised $91,000 for The Nature Conservancy. By December 2008, the number of users was reported at 6.3 million, and the application was ranked as one of the five most popular Facebook applications. The area of Costa Rican rainforest that had been saved at that time was up to 70 million square feet.

In its final accounting, Causes.com, the independent charity clearinghouse for Facebook apps that processed its donations, reported that (Lil) Green Patch had generated $210,261 in contributions for The Nature Conservancy. As of December 2010, it remained the all-time top recruiter for this charity, with nearly 1,200 users, more than double the next largest contributor.

== Controversy ==
Playdom acquired the independent Green Patch team in November 2009. While Green Patch benefited from the huge increase in Facebook members going on concurrently, many of these new Facebook users were unfamiliar with independent organizations such as Causes.com used to provide accountability for charitable contributions, but hyper aware of similar scams common elsewhere on the web. As a result, the accuracy of Green Patch's charity donation were widely questioned in blog comments.

Another source of controversy swirled about the amount of the donations relative to the size of the user population. Despite an average donation per contribution ratio exceeding $175 per contributor, some detractors disparaged the game by claiming total donations amounted to just pennies per user.

== Dissolution ==
Rumors, speculation and controversy also surround the surprise cancellation of the still popular (Lil) Green Patch just 6 months after Playdom acquired the Green Patch team and the month immediately prior to the announcement of Playdom's acquisition by Disney. Playdom also announced they were canceling all other games from the GreenPatch except (Lil) Farm Life.

Also during the time between the rapid rise of (Lil) Green Patch and its subsequent acquisition and eventual cancellation, competitor Zynga initiated trade secrets lawsuits against Green Patch, Playdom and 22 other rivals. These lawsuits were settled subsequent to Disney's acquisition of Playdom.

== Inspiration for a new genre ==
(Lil) Green Patch has been described as the "granddaddy of green Facebook apps" and its game play and art style have inspired many other similar applications.

== See also ==
- Pet Society
