= Sid & Al's Incredible Toons =

1993 video game

- Developer: Dynamix
- Publisher: Sierra On-Line
- Series: The Incredible Machine
- Platforms: MS-DOS, Macintosh
- Release: 1993
- Genre: Puzzle
- Mode: Single-player

Sid & Al's Incredible Toons is a puzzle video game developed by Dynamix and released by Sierra On-Line in 1993.

== Summary ==
In-game screenshot

This video game is designed with the same style as that of The Incredible Machine, except that the game takes place on a cartoon stage instead of a laboratory. The game focuses on the humorous adventures of the game's two main characters, Sid E. Mouse and Al E. Cat (both puns on 'city mouse' and 'alley cat', respectively), as each tries to make life unbearable for the other. It features 100 puzzles and an editor, which allows players to design their own puzzles. The main objective of the game is to finish a "puzzle-piece" photograph by completing each puzzle. When each puzzle (or level) is completed a missing piece on the photograph is replaced.

Sid & Al's Incredible Toons is the predecessor of The Incredible Toon Machine.

== Critical reception ==
Reception

Review score
Publication	Score
Electronic Entertainment	8 out of 10

The game received positive reviews from critics. Computer Gaming World in 1994 said that "Sid & Al's Incredible Toons was "exactly what I wanted from a sequel to The Incredible Machine, with more challenging puzzles, "hysterically funny" animation and sound, and "a host of small improvements". The magazine praised the many possible reactions from combining characters, the "66 different objects", and the manual, concluding that Sid & Al "will certainly show up on best game of the year lists". Wiz rated it 90, PC Games (Germany) rated it 89, Power Play rated it 89, Tilt rated it 86, Power Unlimited rated it 85, Freak rated it 80, High Score rated it 80, and PC Player (Germany) rated it 78.

Giving the game a score of 80 out of 100, Electronic Entertainment wrote "Sid & Al's Incredible Toons from Dynamix combines the logical game play of The Incredible Machine with wacky animated cartoons - Rube Goldberg meets Wile E. Coyote".

Sid & Al's Incredible Toons was a runner-up for Computer Gaming World's Strategy Game of the Year award in June 1994, losing to Master of Orion. The editors called Sid & Al's Incredible Toons "a difficult game to describe because it moves beyond the boundaries of the genre into a new generation of software toys". In 1994 PC Gamer UK named Sid & Al the 24th best computer game of all time.
