= The Incredible Machine =

- The Incredible Machine 3.0
- Genre: Puzzle
- Developers: Kevin Ryan; Dynamix
- Publishers: Dynamix; Sierra On-Line
- Creator: Kevin Ryan
- Platforms: MS-DOS, 3DO, FM Towns, Windows, Macintosh, iOS
- First release: The Incredible Machine; 1993
- Latest release: The Incredible Machine; 2011

The Incredible Machine (TIM) is a series of computer games in which players create a series of Rube Goldberg devices. They were originally designed and coded by Kevin Ryan and produced by Jeff Tunnell, the now-defunct Jeff Tunnell Productions, and published by Dynamix; the 1993 through 1995 versions had the same development team, but the later 2000–2001 games have different designers. All versions were published by Sierra Entertainment. The entire series and intellectual property were acquired by Jeff Tunnell-founded PushButton Labs in October 2009. PushButton Labs was later acquired by Playdom, itself a division of Disney Interactive, so as of now the rights are held by The Walt Disney Company.

A new game by Jeff Tunnell, called Contraption Maker, is the spiritual successor to the Incredible Machine series. It was produced by Spotkin Games, a company founded by Jeff Tunnell, and features the same developers of the original Incredible Machine. The game was released through Steam for Windows and OS X on July 7, 2014.

== Gameplay ==
The general goal of the games is to create a series of Rube Goldberg devices: arrange a given collection of objects in a needlessly complex fashion so as to perform some simple task, such as "put the ball into a box" or "start a mixer and turn on a fan". Available objects range from simple ropes and pulleys to electrical generators, bowling balls, and even cats and mice to humans, most of which have specific interactions with or reactions to other objects: for example, mice will run towards nearby cheese, and light sources placed next to a magnifying glass will ignite wicks. Levels have a set of fixed objects that cannot be moved by the player, and the player must solve the puzzle by carefully arranging a provided set of objects around the fixed items. There is also a "freeform" option that allows the user to "play" with all the objects with no set goal or to also build their own puzzles with goals for other players to attempt to solve.

Notably, the games simulate not only the physical interactions between objects but also ambient effects like varying air pressure and gravity. The engine does not use a random number generator in its physics simulation, ensuring that the results for any given machine are deterministic.

== Games ==
The series includes four core games and a "Toon" spin-off, with multiple iterations published of the earliest titles:

- The Incredible Machine (1993, MS-DOS, 3DO)
  - The Even More Incredible Machine (1993, MS-DOS, Windows, Mac)
- Sid & Al's Incredible Toons (1993, MS-DOS)
- The Incredible Machine 2 (1994, MS-DOS, Windows, Mac)
  - The Incredible Machine Version 3.0 (1995, Windows, Mac)
- The Incredible Toon Machine (1994, Windows, Mac)
- Arthur to Astaroth no Nazomakaimura: Incredible Toons (1996, PlayStation, Saturn)
- Return of the Incredible Machine: Contraptions (2000, Windows, Mac)
  - The Incredible Machine: Even More Contraptions (2001, Windows, Mac, Palm OS)
- The Incredible Machine (2011, iPad)

A compilation called The Incredible Machine Mega Pack was released in 2009 on GOG.com for Windows. It included The Even More Incredible Machine, The Incredible Machine Version 3.0, Return of the Incredible Machine: Contraptions, and The Incredible Machine: Even More Contraptions.

=== The Incredible Machine and Even More Incredible Machine ===
The Incredible Machine, the first game in the series, was originally going to be developed by Electronic Arts for the Commodore 64 in 1984, but Dynamix worked on Arcticfox for the Amiga instead and work did not start on The Incredible Machine until early 1993. Kevin Ryan programmed The Incredible Machine, in nine months, on a budget of US$36,000 (equivalent to about $80,235 in 2025). The Even More Incredible Machine is an extended version with 160 levels, about twice the original, and has more parts.

=== The Incredible Machine 2 and 3.0 ===
The Incredible Machine 2 introduced new levels, an extended assortment of parts, a new interface, significantly improved graphics, sounds, and music, and two player hotseat play. It improved on the "freeform" mode, allowing players to create completely playable puzzles by defining not only the participating parts, but also the set of circumstances under which the puzzle will be considered "solved". In terms of gameplay, this version provided the biggest addition to the series, and subsequent updates were basically only ports of the game to newer operating systems with updated graphics/sounds and sometimes new puzzles, but no new parts.

The Incredible Machine Version 3.0 (1995), on some releases titled Professor Tim's Incredible Machines, contains the same levels as The Incredible Machine 2, but with an improved interface and extra features like CD music tracks.

=== Return of the Incredible Machine: Contraptions and Even More Contraptions ===
Return of the Incredible Machine: Contraptions was released in 2000. As a full 32-bit Windows 95 game, it has new 800x600 resolution graphics. Although it has a few new levels, the majority of them are levels from The Incredible Machine 2.

Even More Contraptions (2001) started a service allowing players to share their homemade puzzles using a service called "WonSwap". Even More Contraptions also came with a Palm Pilot version of the game that contained its own unique set of parts and puzzles suited for a small screen.

=== The Incredible Machine Mega Pack ===
Released on GOG.com, The Incredible Machine Mega Pack includes Even More Incredible Machine, The Incredible Machine 3 (contains all levels from The Incredible Machine 2), Contraptions, and Even More Contraptions.

=== The Incredible Machine (2011) ===
Released on the iPad in 2011, the game has 64 levels (and 45 more as in-app purchases). It features a similar three-star system as Cut the Rope.

== Reception ==
Reception

Aggregate scores
Aggregator	Score
GameRankings	The Incredible Machine Version 3.0; 70.00% Return of the Incredible Machine Contraptions; 78.33% The Incredible Machine: Even More Contraptions; 76.00% The Incredible Machine (2011); 65.00% (iOS)
Metacritic	71/100 (iOS)

Review scores
Publication	Score
IGN	8.4/10 (Return of the Incredible Machine: Contraptions)
PC Gamer (US)	90%
Gamezebo	4/5 (iOS)

Neil Harris reported in Computer Gaming World in 1994 that showing The Incredible Machine to an engineer friend caused "a chain reaction that brought productive work to a halt at a major naval yard".

IGN described Return of the Incredible Machine: Contraptions as "a vintage blend of educational and entertainment software at their finest".

By 2000, the series had sold over one million copies.

During the 4th Annual Interactive Achievement Awards, the Academy of Interactive Arts & Sciences honored Return of the Incredible Machine: Contraptions with the "PC Family" award.

== Legacy ==
The Incredible Machine: Even More Contraptions was included in the 2005 edition of Hoyle Puzzle Games as a bonus game.

A mobile phone version was developed by Mobile Interactions Group and published by Vivendi Games Mobile in 2006.

A new game was announced for a download release on Xbox Live Arcade, but was later canceled.

The Incredible Machine Mega Pack (which includes Even More Incredible Machine, The Incredible Machine 3, Return of the Incredible Machine: Contraptions, and The Incredible Machine: Even More Contraptions) was published by Playdom and released on GOG.com on October 1, 2009.

=== iOS ===
The Incredible Machine for iOS is the first version in the series to be developed and released by Disney for the AppStore. This revamped version contains new art, sounds, and levels, as well as a redesigned user interface. Disney released The Incredible Machine on June 8, 2011, at E3 in Los Angeles, CA. The app has been retired from the app store as a decision made by Disney.

=== Contraption Maker ===
In 2013, Tunnell began the work on a new game, called Contraption Maker, which is billed as a "spiritual successor" to the Incredible Machine series. Kevin Ryan and Brian Hahn, the other two developers on the original game, worked on Contraption Maker as well, along with other developers at Spotkin, a video game development company started by Tunnell.

Contraption Maker features improved "HD" graphics, and has a robust physics engine. The game features over 200 official puzzles and over 100 different parts. It also has Steam Workshop support, so users can create and share their own puzzles.

The game was first released on Steam through its Early Access program on August 28, 2013. Throughout its time in the program, Contraption Maker had 6 Alpha releases, adding features such as multiplayer and copy-and-paste, new parts, and new puzzles, followed by a Beta release in May 2014. The final (1.0) release was made in July the same year, and Contraption Maker left the Steam Early Access program. Since release, three expansion packs have been released, with the latest released in December 2023.

== See also ==
- Crazy Machines
