= Wild Ones (video game) =

Game by Playdom existing between 2009 and 2013

- Developer: Playdom
- Publisher: Playdom
- Platforms: Google+, Facebook, MySpace, Playdom.com
- Release: 18 December 2009
- Genres: Multiplayer, action, arcade shooter

Wild Ones was a video game published by Playdom. It was released on 18 December 2009 and closed on 28 August 2013, becoming one of Playdom's most popular games.

== Gameplay ==
Wild Ones was a multiplayer action and arcade shooter game. It was available on Facebook, Google+ and since 2010, on MySpace. Originally, it was a last man standing game. This was later changed, however.

== History ==
Wild Ones was released on 18 December 2009 by Playdom. During this period, it counted with around 300,000 monthly active users. This number increased to 2,000,000 by 2010. The game was inspired on the game Worms. It also bore certain similarity to the game Crazy Planets. It managed to become one of the three most popular games of Playdom. It closed on 28 August 2013.

Years later, Facebook admitted having tricked children and adults to spend money on several free-to-play games, including Wild Ones.

== Reception ==
Common Sense Media gave the game 4/5 stars and recommended it for persons older than 13.

== Aftermath ==
There were various projects to revive the game. The most popular one is Wild Ones Remake. It was released in 2016 by Evolved Digitals, a group made up by three Georgian and Tunisian developers. Up to 2,000,000 people have played their three main games, including Wild Ones Remake. Another one is Wild Ones Ultimate.
