= Compute! =

Defunct American home computer magazine

- June 1987 issue, showing Laser Chess
- Frequency: Monthly
- Publisher: Small System Services (1979–1983); ABC Publishing (1983–1994)
- First issue: November / December 1979
- Final issue: September 1994
- Country: United States
- Based in: New York City
- ISSN: 0194-357X

Compute! (ISSN 0194-357X), often stylized as COMPUTE!, was an American home computer magazine that was published from 1979 to 1994. Its origins can be traced to 1978 in Len Lindsay's PET Gazette, one of the first magazines for the Commodore PET. In its 1980s heyday, Compute! covered all major platforms, and several single-platform spinoffs of the magazine were launched. The most successful of these was Compute!'s Gazette, which catered to VIC-20, Commodore 64, and later the Commodore 128 computer users.

Compute! printed type-in programs for games, utilities, and applications, usually in BASIC. Often there were multiple versions for different computers. Sometimes programs were provided as lists of numbers representing a machine language program, to be typed in a utility called MLX.

== History ==
Compute!'s original goal was to write about and publish programs for all of the computers that used some version of the MOS Technology 6502 CPU. It started out in 1979.

ABC Publishing acquired Compute! Publications in May 1983 for $18 million in stock, and raised circulation of the magazine from 200,000 to 420,000 by the end of the year. Compute!'s Gazette, for Commodore computers, began publishing that year. Compute! claimed in 1983 that it published more type-in programs "in each issue than any magazine in the industry". A typical issue would feature a large-scale program for one of the covered platforms, with smaller programs for one or more platforms filling the remainder of the issue's type-ins.

Editors of the magazine included Robert Lock, Richard Mansfield, Charles Brannon, and Tom R. Halfhill. Noted columnists included Jim Butterfield, educator Fred D'Ignazio and science fiction author Orson Scott Card.

In 1984–1985, Compute! published type-in listings for the SpeedScript word processor by Charles Brannon, which was on-par with commercial offerings at the time.

In 1987, Laser Chess for the Atari ST won Compute!'s programming competition and versions were published for other systems in the magazine. Multiple Laser Chess inspired games have been written since then.

With the May 1988 issue, the magazine was redesigned and the type-in program listings were dropped.

In 1990, Compute! was out of publication for several months when it was sold to General Media, publishers at the time of Omni and Penthouse magazines, in May of that year. General Media changed the title of the magazine to COMPUTE, without the exclamation point, and the cover design was changed to resemble that of OMNI magazine. Ziff Davis bought Compute!'s assets, including its subscriber list, in 1994. General Media had ceased its publication before the sale.

== Former employees ==
After Compute! Publications, Robert Lock started another company, Signal Research, which was among the first to publish magazines and books about computer games. Among the biggest magazine published by Signal Research was Game Players, a magazine devoted to Nintendo, PC, and Sega gaming. He also wrote the book The Traditional Potters of Seagrove, N.C. in 1994, and started Southern Arts Journal, a quarterly magazine featuring essays, fiction and poetry about all things Southern, in 2005, but it ceased publication the next year after only four issues.

Tom R. Halfhill went on to become a senior editor at Byte. He is currently a technology analyst at The Linley Group and a senior editor of Microprocessor Report.

David D. Thornburg continued to work in the field of educational technology and was involved in projects both in the US and Brazil.

Charles G. Brannon moved to the San Francisco Bay Area to work as a Project Manager for Epyx, before moving back to Greensboro and working for his father's insurance wholesaler company Group US as an Information Technology Manager. He has retired as of 2016.

== Books ==
Under the name COMPUTE! Books, Compute! sold 6 × 9 inch spiral bound collections of articles previously published in the magazine. These were often platform-specific, such as COMPUTE's! First Book of Atari and COMPUTE!'s First Book of Atari Graphics. Some original books were also published, such as Mapping the Atari (1983) by Ian Chadwick.

== Reception ==
Time Extension wrote: "The magazine ran across three decades, but it’s the late '80s / early '90s era that’s really interesting, as it provides a fascinating counterpoint to the micro-computer dominance of the UK gaming media."
