= The Incredible Toon Machine =

1994 video game

- Developers: Presage Software; Dynamix
- Publisher: Sierra On-Line
- Series: The Incredible Machine
- Platforms: Windows, Macintosh
- Release: 1994, 1996
- Genre: Puzzle
- Mode: Single Player

The Incredible Toon Machine is a game developed by Presage Software and published by Sierra On-Line.

== Gameplay ==
The Incredible Toon Machine presents a series of Rube Goldberg–style puzzles in which the player assembles contraptions using a variety of animated parts. The game contains 100 puzzles divided into four groups. The first 30 puzzles function as tutorials that introduce the available components and demonstrate how they interact. Each of the remaining three groups contains 15 puzzles, and solving those 15 unlocks five additional puzzles within that group. Completing all 60 non‑tutorial puzzles opens access to 10 more puzzles. As puzzles are solved, the game awards pieces of a 100‑piece jigsaw puzzle. Players can save their progress through a password system. The game also includes a separate jigsaw puzzle mode in addition to the main sequence of contraption‑building challenges.

== Reception ==
Reception

Review scores
Publication	Score
Computer Player	8/10
Evansville Courier and Press	2.5/4
The Boston Globe	4/5

The Boston Globe gave The Incredible Toon Machine a score of 4 out 5.
