= Compute!'s Gazette =

U.S. magazine covering Commodore and retro computing

- Premiere issue, July 1983
- Categories: Computer magazine
- Frequency: Monthly
- Format: Print and online
- Publisher: COMPUTE! Publications, Inc.
- Founder: Small System Services
- Founded: 1983
- First issue: July 1983; July 2025 (relaunched)
- Final issue: February 1995 (original run)
- Country: United States
- Based in: Greensboro, North Carolina (1983–1995); Leander, Texas (2025–present)
- Language: English
- ISSN: 3067-5782 (print); 3067-5790 (web)

Compute!'s Gazette is an American computer magazine that was first published from 1983 to 1995 and relaunched in 2025. Originally dedicated to users of Commodore's home computers, the revived magazine now covers the broader retro computing landscape, including Apple II, Atari 8-bit, Amiga, Tandy, MS-DOS, and other classic platforms.

== History ==
=== Original run (1983–1995) ===
The magazine debuted in July 1983 as a Commodore-only spin-off of Compute!. It quickly gained popularity for its type-in programs, technical tutorials, and software reviews.

Programs were written in BASIC or 6502 machine language, often spanning multiple pages. To support users, the magazine published utilities such as the Automatic Proofreader (October 1983) and MLX, a machine-language entry tool. Beginning in May 1984, subscribers could order a monthly disk containing all the programs from each issue.

The magazine's most popular application was SpeedScript, a word processor introduced in January 1984.

Gazette also featured regular columns like "The VIC Magician" by Michael Tomczyk and the reader Q&A section "CAPUTE!". It reached a peak monthly circulation of over 200,000 copies and was reported to be profitable from its first issue.

In June 1990, the final stand-alone issue was published. After a three-month hiatus, Gazette was folded into Compute! as a section. In December 1993, the print version ended; the publication continued in disk-only format until February 12, 1995.

=== Revival (2025–present) ===
On April 11, 2025, COMPUTE! Publications, Inc., based in Leander, Texas, announced the revival of Compute!'s Gazette as a modern retro computing magazine.
