= Mission Asteroid =

1980 video game

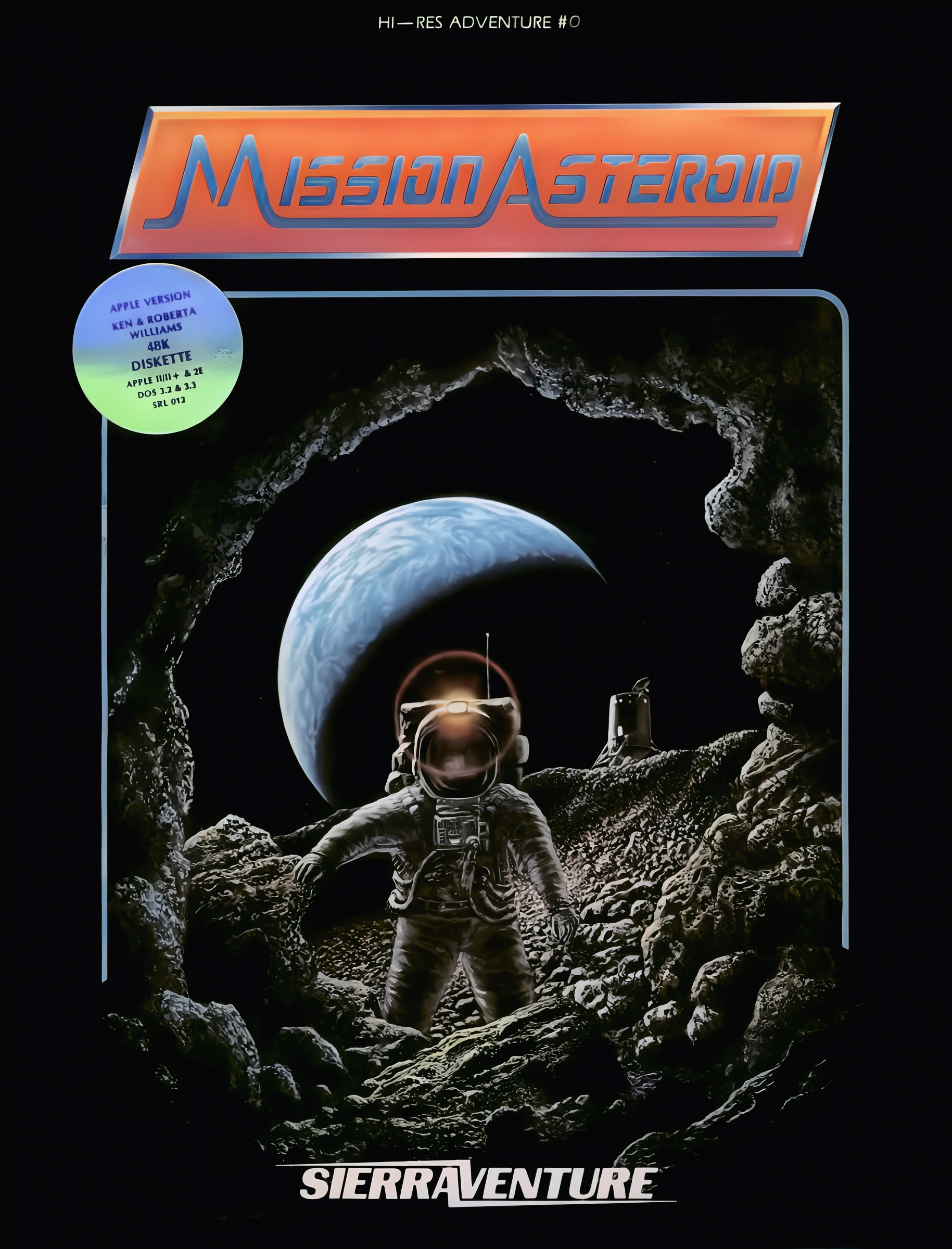
- Re-release cover art
- Developer: On-Line Systems
- Publisher: On-Line Systems
- Designer: Roberta Williams
- Programmer: Ken Williams
- Series: Hi-Res Adventures
- Engine: ADL
- Platforms: Apple II, Atari 8-bit, PC-88, PC-98, FM-7, Commodore 64
- Release: 1980: Apple II; NA: 1980; Atari 8-bit; NA: 1982; PC-88, PC-98; JP: April 1983; FM-7; JP: April 1983; Commodore 64; NA: December 1983
- Genre: Graphic adventure
- Mode: Single-player

Mission Asteroid (shown as Mission: Asteroid in the manual and on the title screen) is a graphic adventure game for the Apple II written by Ken and Roberta Williams and released in 1980 by On-Line Systems.

== Release ==
The game was released as Hi-Res Adventures #0, despite being released after Mystery House and Wizard and the Princess. It was meant as an introduction to the adventure game genre so it was made easier than the rest of the Hi-Res Adventures games.

It was ported to the Atari 8-bit computers and Commodore 64.

== Reception ==
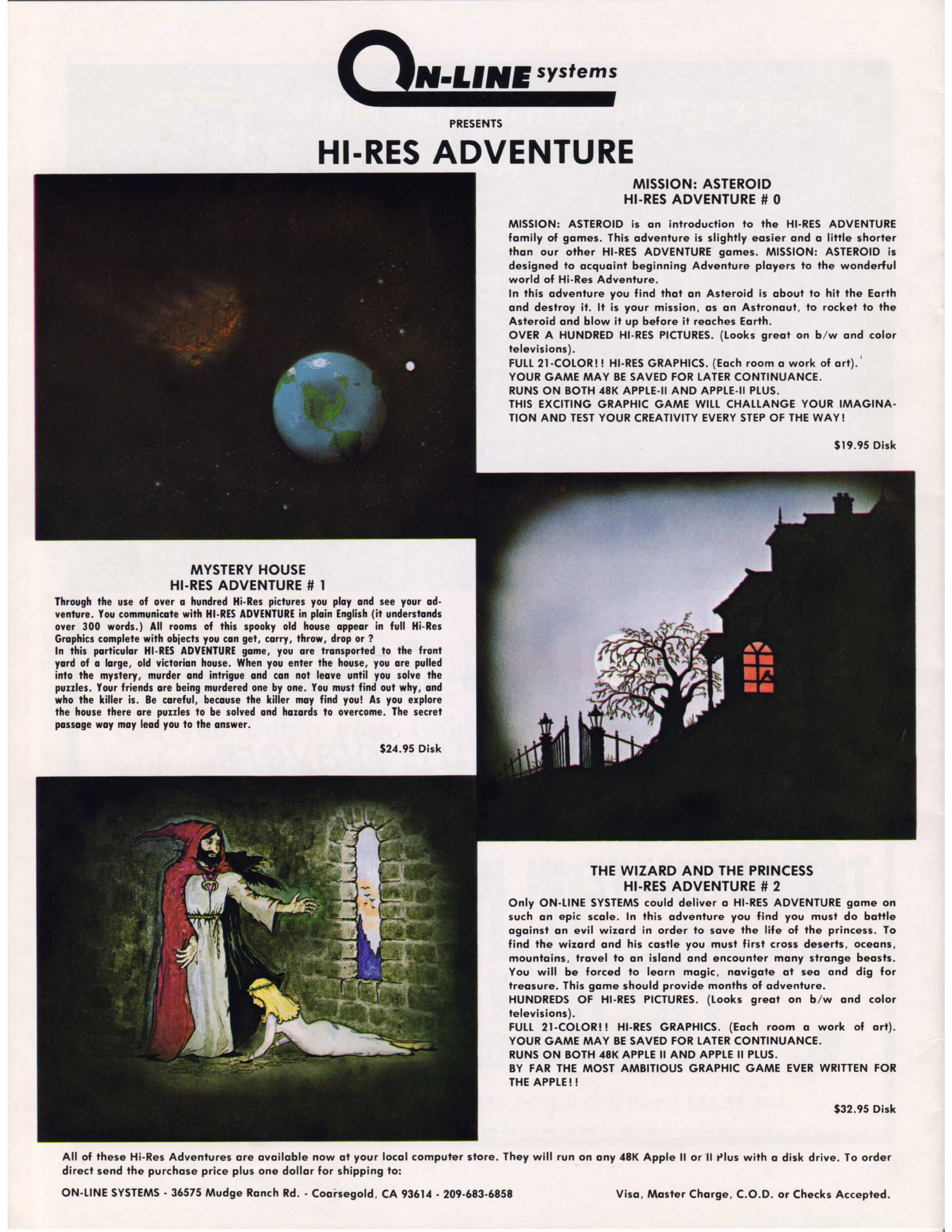
Advertisement from the June 1981 issue of The On-Line Letter for some of On-Line Systems' Hi-Res Adventure games, including Mission Asteroid

Mark Marlow reviewed Mission: Asteroid, Mystery House, and The Wizard and the Princess for Computer Gaming World, and stated that "Mission: Asteroid is the simplest of the group and only requires a few hours to solve".
