= Not All Fairy Tales Have Happy Endings =

2020 memoir by Ken Williams

Not All Fairy Tales Have Happy Endings: The Rise and Fall of Sierra On-Line
- Original book cover
- Author: Ken Williams
- Language: English
- Genre: Memoir
- Published: 2020 (Lulu.com)
- Publication place: United States
- Media type: E-book, Print
- Pages: 408
- ISBN: 978-1-71672-736-8

Not All Fairy Tales Have Happy Endings: The Rise and Fall of Sierra On-Line is a memoir by Ken Williams, co-founder and former CEO of defunct American video game developer and publisher Sierra On-Line. Published in 2020, the book chronicles major events spanning from the founding of Sierra On-Line to its eventual collapse and is interspersed with discussion on management practices at the company.
