= Roberta Williams =

American video game designer (born 1953)

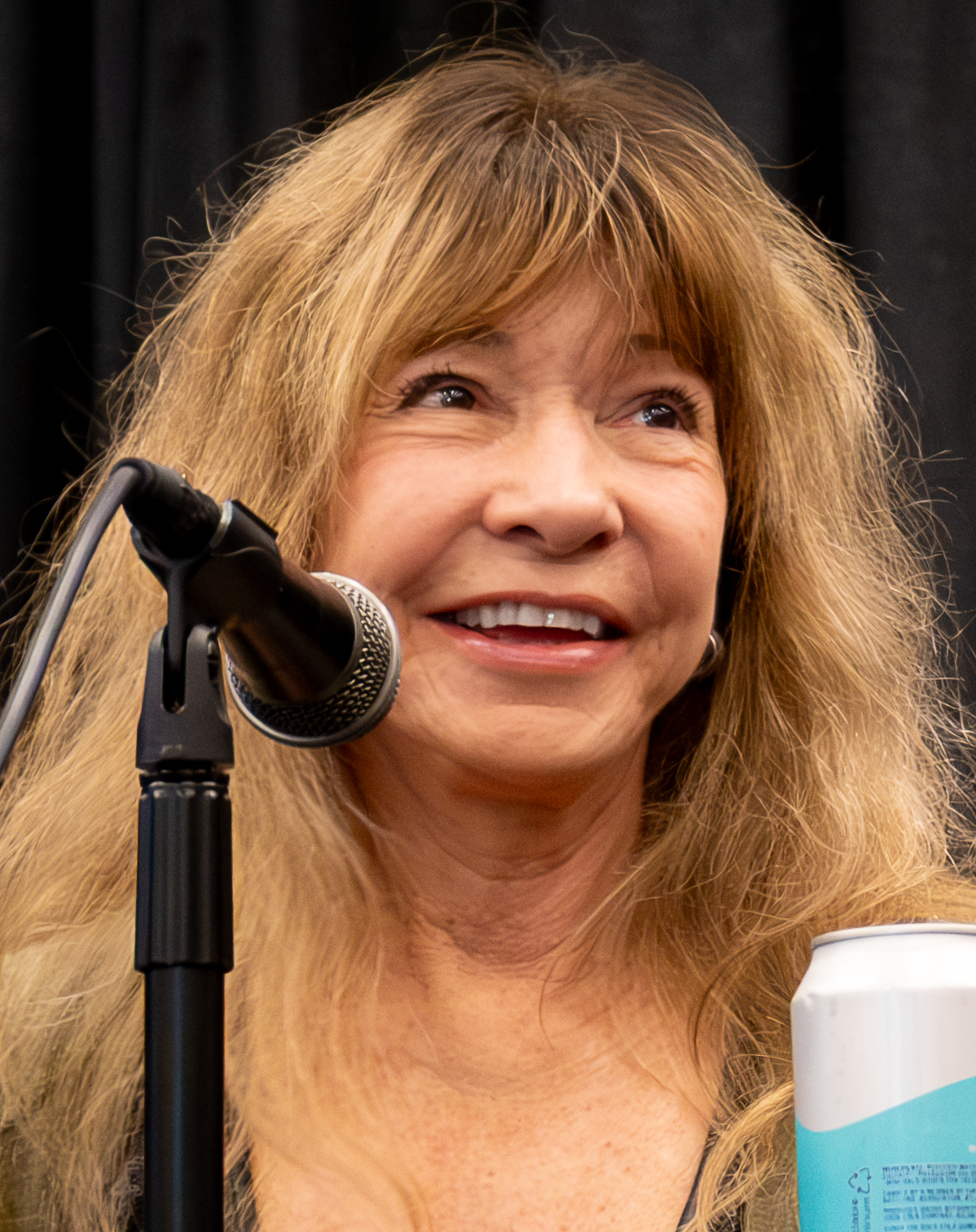
- Roberta Williams in 2024
- Born: Roberta Lynn Heuer; February 16, 1953 (age 73); Los Angeles, California, U.S.
- Occupations: Video game designer, writer
- Known for: King's Quest; Mystery House; Phantasmagoria
- Spouse: Ken Williams (m. 1972)
- Children: 2
- Website: robertawilliams.com; sierragamers.com; robertasbook.com; cygnusentertainment.com

Roberta Lynn Williams (née Heuer; born February 16, 1953) is an American video game designer and writer. She has been named by several publications as one of the best or most influential creators in the video game industry.

Williams co-founded Sierra On-Line with her husband, game developer Ken Williams. In 1980, her first game, Mystery House, became a modest commercial success; it is credited as the first graphic adventure game. She then became known for creating and maintaining the King's Quest series, as well as designing the full motion video game Phantasmagoria in 1995. Sierra was acquired by CUC International in 1996, leading to layoffs and management changes. Williams took a brief sabbatical, and returned to the company in a game design role, but grew increasingly frustrated with CUC's creative and business decisions.

After the release of King's Quest: Mask of Eternity in 1998, Williams left the game industry in 1999 and focused her retirement on traveling and writing historical fiction. She has since released her historical novel Farewell to Tara in 2021, and returned to game development with the 3D remake of the classic adventure game Colossal Cave Adventure, released as Colossal Cave in 2023.

Several publications have called Roberta Williams the "queen of adventure games" for co-founding Sierra, pioneering the graphic adventure game genre, and creating the King's Quest series. She has received the Industry Icon Award from the Game Awards, and the Pioneer Award at the Game Developers Choice Awards.

== Early life and career ==
Born in Los Angeles, Roberta Heuer grew up in rural Southern California as the daughter of an agricultural inspector. A shy child with a vivid imagination, she often created fairy-tale adventure stories to entertain her family. She would lie in bed and imagine fantastical situations, which she sometimes described as her "movies". She met her future husband Ken Williams when they were both teenagers, and the two began dating. After high school, she became a clerk at the Los Angeles County Welfare Department, in part thanks to her father's connections working in local government. In late 1972, Roberta married Ken just a few days after his eighteenth birthday, and gave birth to their first son in November 1973. The couple briefly moved to Illinois, where she was employed as a computer operator, soon moving back to Los Angeles where she took a job at Lawry's Foods as a computer programmer working in COBOL.

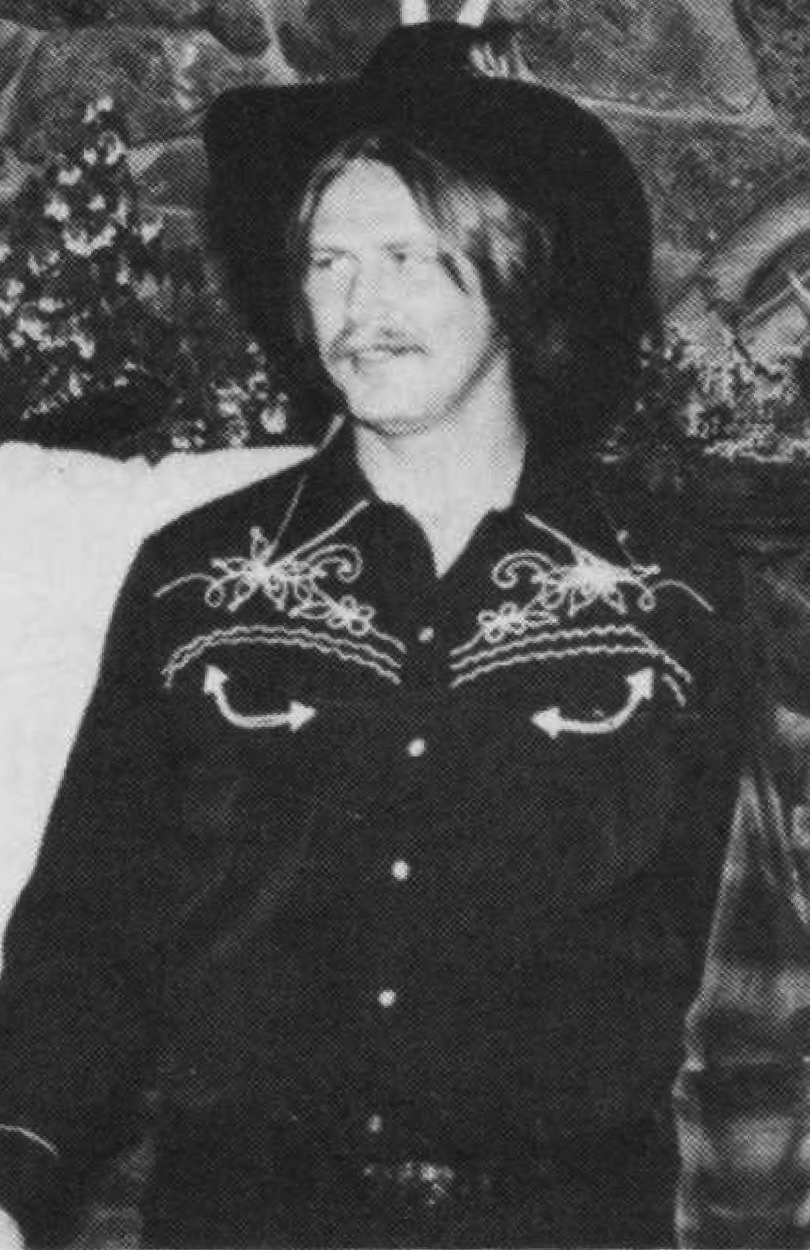
Ken Williams, Roberta's husband and co-founder of Sierra, 16 May 1981, On-Line Systems first year Western Dinner/Dance

By 1979, the couple had two children. Ken was employed as a computer programmer and consultant, working on large IBM mainframe machines. They wanted to leave Los Angeles to fulfill their dream of living in the woods. As Ken brainstormed ideas for a technology business that would be viable outside of a major city, Roberta purchased an Apple II computer for the family, which strained their expenses. Roberta's love of computers grew as she played several text adventure games.

== Game design career ==
=== Early graphic adventure games (1979–1983) ===
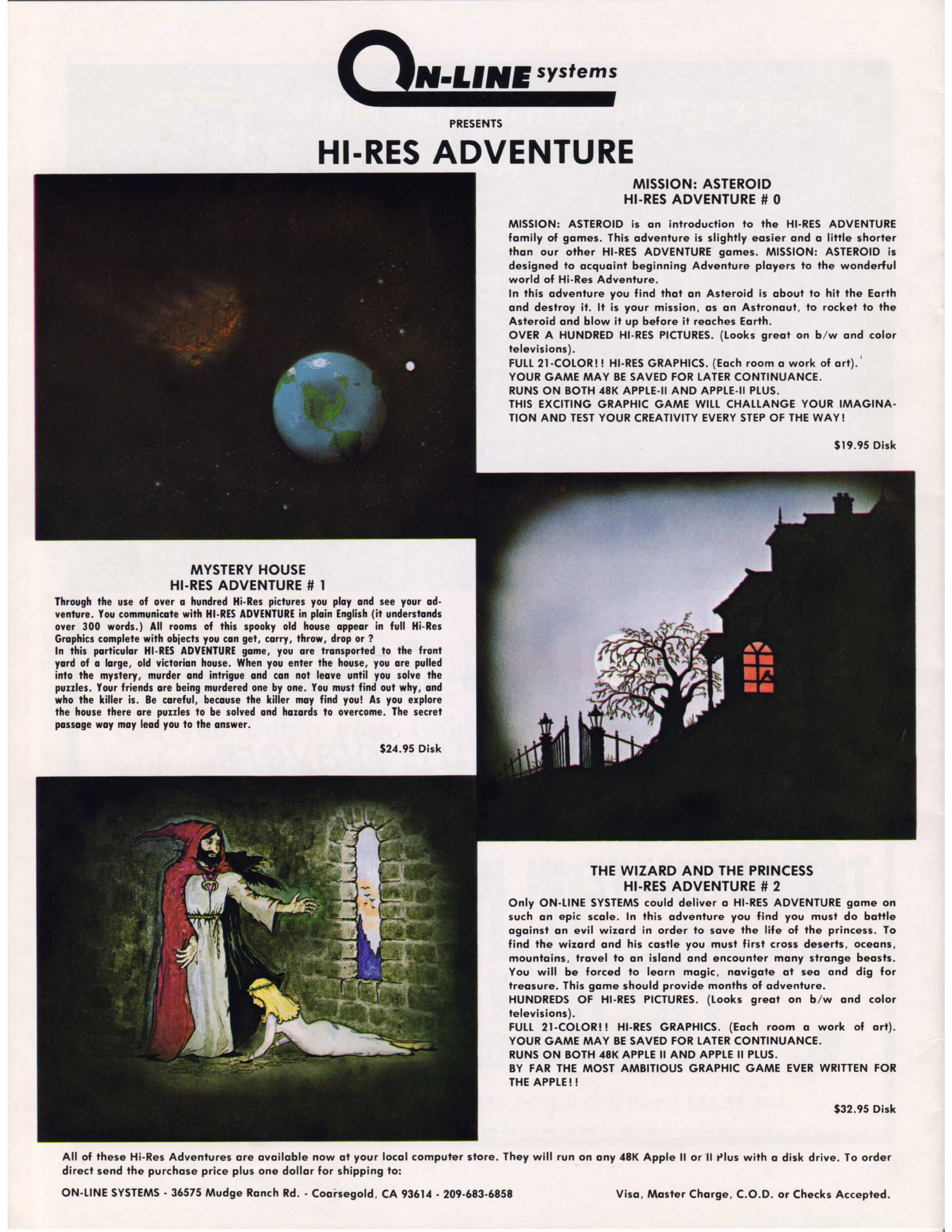
Advertisement from the June 1981 issue of The On-Line Letter for some Hi-Res Adventure games, including Mystery House and The Wizard and the Princess

Around 1979, Roberta Williams was an avid player of text adventures on her teletype machine, particularly as a fan of Colossal Cave Adventure. She was inspired to speak to her husband Ken Williams about her vision for what a video game could be, drawing influence from Agatha Christie's story And Then There Were None, and the board game Clue. Roberta convinced Ken to provide the technical knowledge to program the game, while she contributed her experience with fiction and storytelling. Roberta drew the pictures using her Apple II and a Versawriter, a graphics tablet that could be used to hand-trace a piece of paper and input the image into a computer. Since no programs existed to read the Versawriter image, Ken had to write one, eventually compressing nearly seventy images onto a disk.

The result was Mystery House, an adventure game with black and white graphics for the Apple II computer. Released in 1980, the game was distributed by mail order, advertised in computer magazines under the name of Ken's consulting company, On-Line Systems. The game soon sold ten thousand copies, with Roberta personally packing the disks and supporting materials in Ziploc bags, and answering her home phone to provide hints for the game's puzzles. Ken began to personally distribute copies of the game to computer stores. He quit his consulting job, with hopes that it would allow the couple to eventually move out of the city.

They released the Wizard and the Princess later that year, improving on their previous title with color graphics and dithering. The game sold 60,000 copies, leading them to hire more employees for distribution and programming. Encouraged by the success of their first two games, On-Line Systems switched its focus from consulting to game development. Roberta's ambitions grew with the design of Time Zone, a time-travelling game spanning thousands of years, which was released on twelve disks in 1982. Around this time, Roberta's parents retired and moved to Oakhurst, California, and she hoped to move close by. With their company expanding, the couple was finally able to move On-Line Systems from Simi Valley, California to Coarsegold. They also changed their company name to Sierra On-Line, based on its location near the Sierra Nevada mountains.

After just two years Sierra had grown to nearly a hundred employees with $10 million in revenue. Sierra's success started to attract investors, including venture capitalists. Around this time, Jim Henson approached Ken Williams to create a game adaptation of The Dark Crystal, before the film's release. Roberta was excited by the project, believing video games to be a facet of entertainment as much as film. She designed much of the game adaptation on paper; it was finalized and released in 1983. The high-profile game caused the company to attract mainstream media attention, and Roberta hoped that the entertainment industry would not just recognize the value of games, but also the value of the artists who created them.

=== King's Quest breakthrough (1983–1994) ===
Programmers, authors are going to be the future new entertainers ... It might be presumptuous to say they might be new Robert Redfords ... but to a certain extent [they will be] idolized. Tomorrow's heroes.

— Roberta Williams, 1982 interview

By 1983, Sierra's new investors pushed the company to diversify into video game cartridges for platforms such as the Atari. The video game industry soon experienced a crash, and Sierra's board of directors began to push a merger with Spinnaker Software, an educational software company. When Spinnaker presented their proposal to the Sierra board, Roberta proclaimed, "These guys are a joke. No one in the industry respects them. Can't we talk about something productive?" Although Ken Williams was amenable to the deal, Roberta strongly opposed it, and the merger did not proceed. Sierra was forced to downsize to 30 employees, and the Williams family mortgaged their home to pay their remaining employees.

Sierra had cultivated a strong relationship with IBM as the IBM PC was being developed, and Wizard and the Princess was one of the first games released for the computer under the title Adventure in Serenia. Around the time of Sierra's financial difficulties, IBM offered to invest in the struggling company, with hopes of creating a game that could showcase the technical capabilities of their upcoming IBM PCjr. Roberta had wanted to build on her experience with The Wizard and the Princess with a fully animated adventure game, in a pseudo-3D world. This led to the 1984 release of King's Quest, conceived as a blend of common fairy tales that could be directly experienced as a game. Although the PCjr was considered a failure, King's Quest was ported to many other platforms and quickly rose to bestseller status. The game was considered revolutionary for its pseudo-3D elements, becoming the first adventure game to allow the player character to move in front of, behind, or over other objects on the screen. It was also the first computer game to support the 16-color EGA standard, setting a new standard for future graphic adventure games.

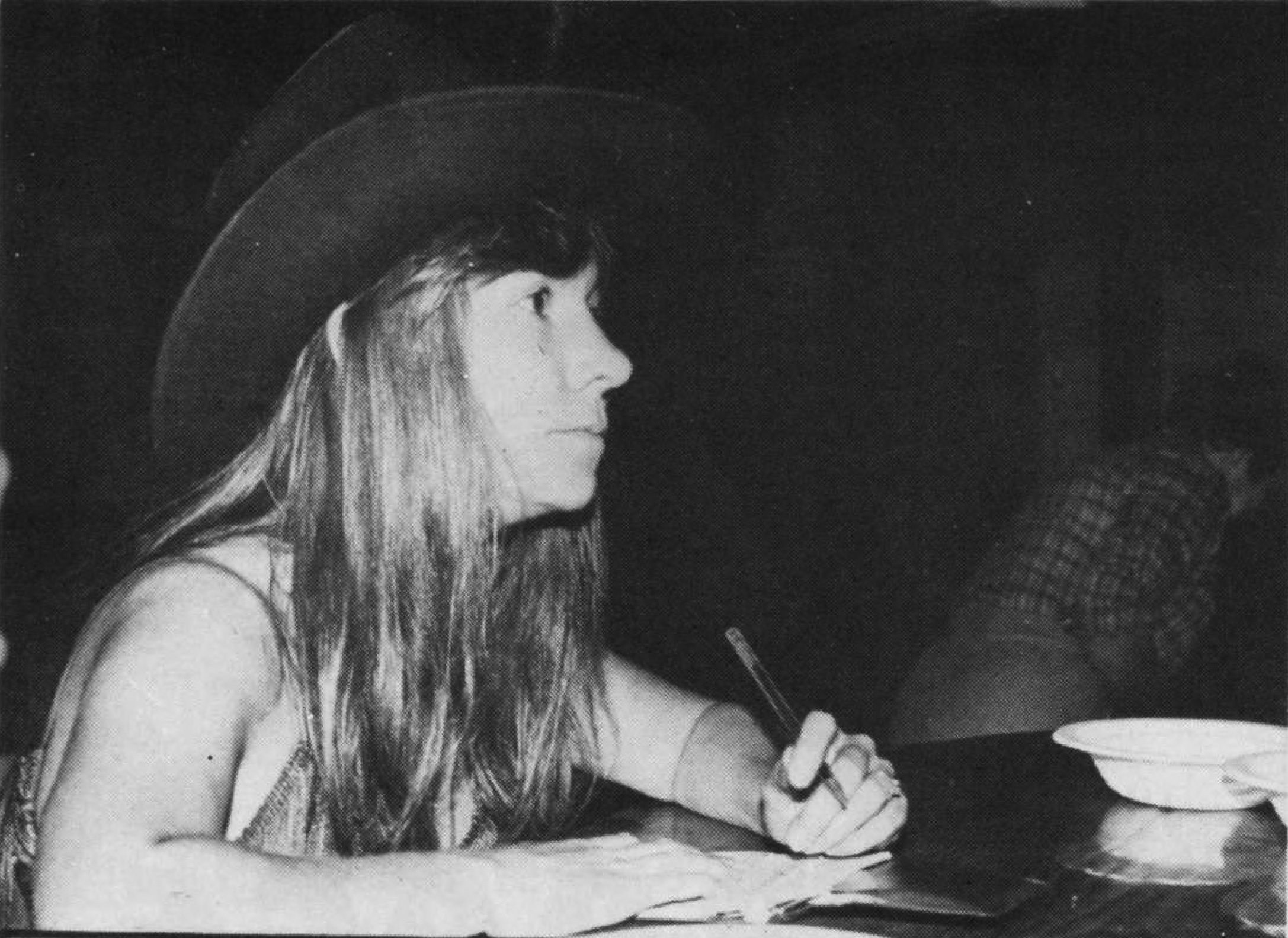
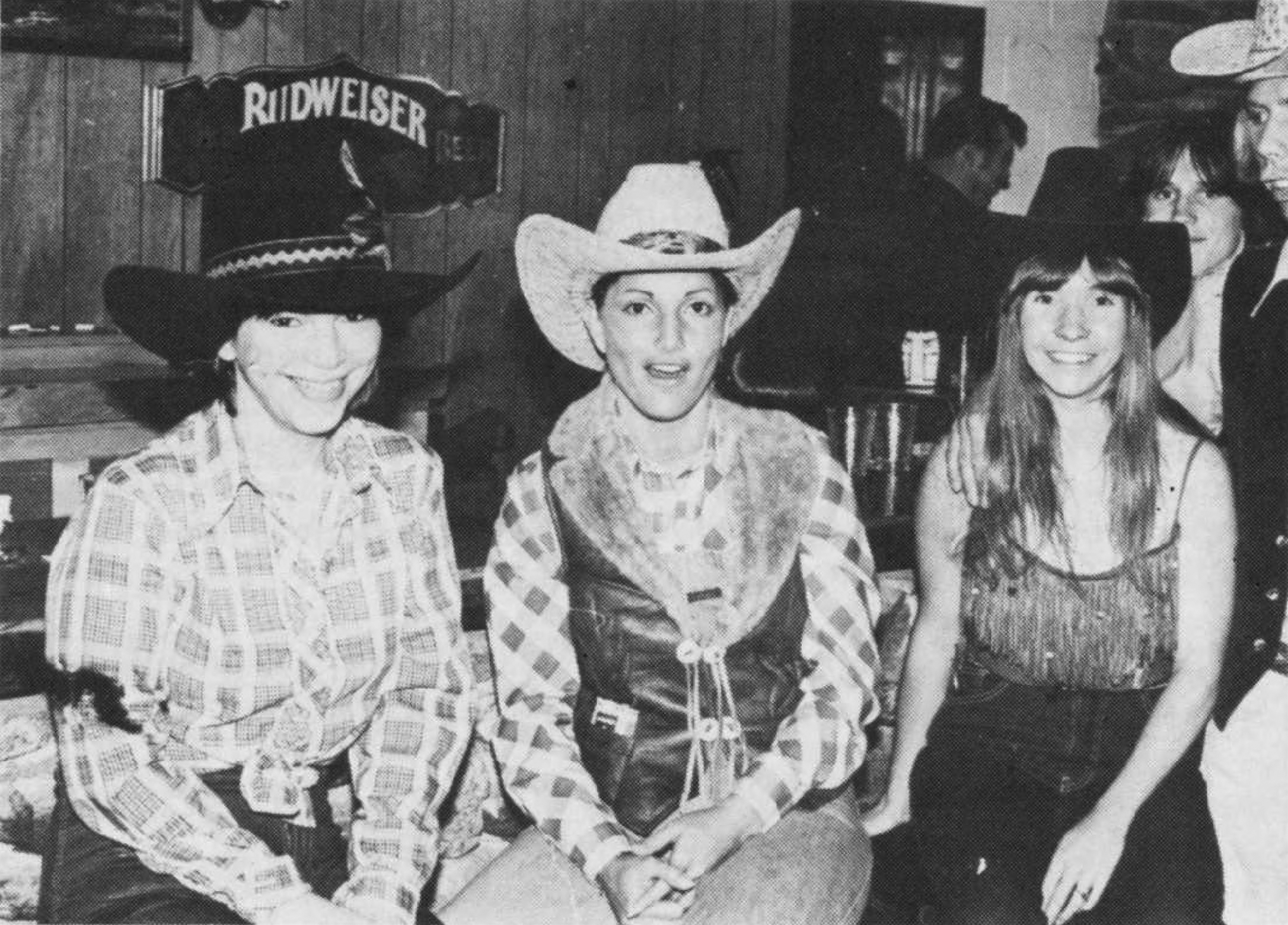
Williams (top; bottom right) with fellow On-Line Systems employees Maria Stahl (left) and Diane Siegal (middle), 16 May 1981, On-Line Systems first year Western Dinner/Dance

Meanwhile, Roberta continued her role as designer of the King's Quest series, which earned a reputation for its unique style of storytelling, as well as its increasingly advanced graphics and technology. The 1986 release of King's Quest III: To Heir is Human was larger and longer than previous games in the series, and earned a ranking on Time's list of 50 Best Video Games of All Time. When King's Quest IV: The Perils of Rosella was released in 1988, it was one of the first games to receive sound card support, and one of the first adventure games to support a mouse. It was also one of the first games to feature a female protagonist, a creative decision that Williams seeded by introducing the character in the previous game. Some of her peers cautioned that this might deter men from playing the game, but it was even more commercially successful than previous installments. A post-release survey revealed that most men did not mind playing as a female protagonist, whereas many female players preferred the experience. Sierra received registration cards for the game with a near 40% female audience, leading journalists to credit Williams with expanding the player base for personal computer games. King's Quest IV has been considered one of the most influential video games of all time, impacting the design of games such as Maniac Mansion and other LucasArts adventure games.

Williams continued to design other titles, such as the educational title Mixed-Up Mother Goose. The game went on to sell more than 500,000 copies, and the CD-ROM version earned the Software Publishers Association Excellence in Software Award for Best Early Education Program. In 1989, Williams released another mystery adventure game called The Colonel's Bequest, which iterated on ideas from her original Mystery House game with more detailed graphics and improved text parsing. The game was still rare for featuring a female protagonist, and deviated from the traditional adventure game formula to become more of an interactive mystery, putting more onus on the player to discover the plot. The 1990 release of King's Quest V became the first game to use an icon-based interface, continuing the series' innovations in game design. The game was critically acclaimed, winning several awards upon release, with Computer Gaming World including it in their 1996 list of greatest games of all time.

By the early 1990s, Sierra was a publicly traded company, generating $100 million per year in revenue. The company released The Dagger of Amon Ra in 1991, a sequel to The Colonel's Bequest based on characters and concepts created by Williams. Meanwhile, Williams worked with Jane Jensen to design King's Quest VI. Released in 1992, it was recognized by several publications as one of the best adventure games, if not one of the best games overall. By the mid-1990s, Williams was considered the company's most popular game designer, particularly for her success with the King's Quest series. The saga is still remembered as the only video game series created and maintained by a female designer.

=== Later games and career exit (1995–1999) ===
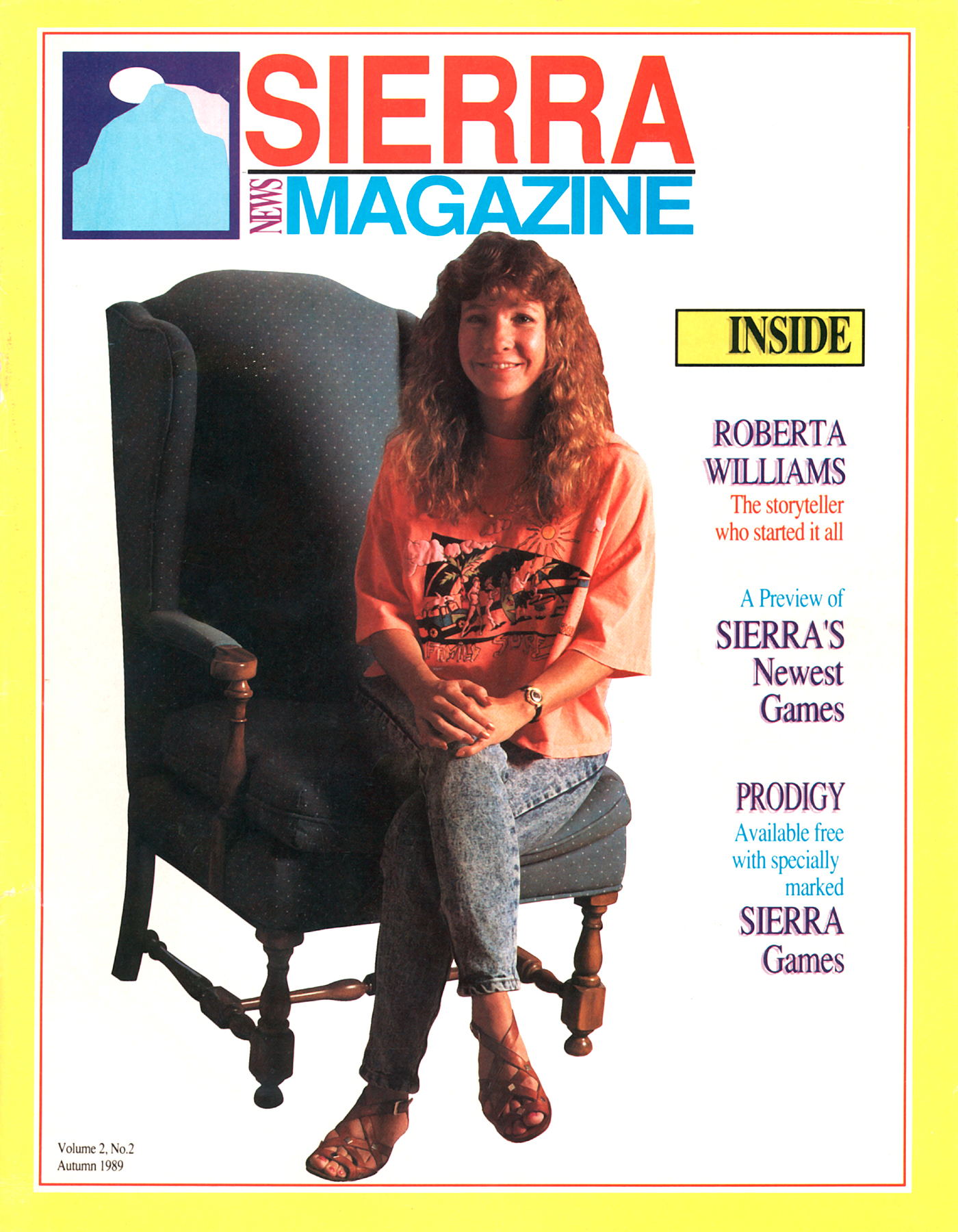
Roberta Williams on the cover of the Fall 1989 edition of the Sierra Magazine

Williams branched out from her work on King's Quest by designing Phantasmagoria, a realistic horror adventure game. As a long time fan of the novels of Stephen King, she had often contemplated whether it was possible to create a terrifying video game. Because she believed it would be difficult to make a truly frightening game without live actors, the game was created entirely in full-motion video. The production ultimately cost $4 million, with a team of nearly two hundred people and a script of more than five hundred pages. Designed as a mature title for adults, the game was marketed as an interactive film, and published on seven CD-ROMs. Although Phantasmagoria received a mixed critical reception, it was one of the most commercially successful adventure games and Sierra's bestselling game, selling more than a million copies upon its release in 1995. Williams recalls the game as her favorite achievement.

In 1996, Sierra was sold to CUC International for more than a billion dollars in stock. Roberta had opposed the deal, and several other high-ranking Sierra employees had felt there was something suspicious about CUC's financials. Roberta ultimately acquiesced, recognizing that the terms of the deal were too favorable to refuse, and that she could be sued by their shareholders if she failed to maximize their value. The company's management and decision-making dramatically changed under CUC, leading Ken Williams to leave his role at Sierra and work directly for their new parent company. The CUC restructuring also led to lay-offs. Roberta Williams took a sabbatical from the game industry, as the company released The Roberta Williams Anthology, a compilation of 14 games.

Roberta Williams returned to game development in early 1997 to work on King's Quest: Mask of Eternity. She hoped to re-introduce some interactivity absent in Phantasmagoria, and to embrace the advances in 3D graphics technology. Sierra had changed significantly as a company, and its new management insisted on adding elements from popular role-playing games such as Diablo, while straying from the game's traditional adventure elements. When she removed certain role-playing elements, the team would re-add them, leading to a power struggle with management. Roberta's frustrations with her lack of control were coupled with suspicions of CUC, after allegations of financial fraud had surfaced about the company. Worried about the company's future, she talked to Ken about selling their stock. The couple soon divested from the company, Ken resigning at the end of 1997, and Roberta staying to finish Mask of Eternity. Released in 1998, the game was considered a commercial and critical disappointment, leading to further layoffs, and the sale of Sierra to Vivendi. That year, CUC was convicted of financial fraud, having exaggerated their revenues by more than half a billion dollars (equivalent to $990 million in 2025). The decline of Sierra had an emotional impact on Roberta, who left the company in 1999. By the 2000s, Sierra's assets were held by Activision Blizzard, after a merger between Activision and Vivendi.

== Retirement ==
After the release of King's Quest: Mask of Eternity, Roberta Williams described herself as taking a sabbatical from the game industry in 1999. In actuality, both she and Ken had signed a non-compete clause with CUC that prevented them from working in the game industry for five years. According to Ken, "By the time the five years were up, we had moved on to other ventures," thus ending Roberta's career in the game industry after 18 years and 20 games. At that time, she stayed away from the public eye and rarely spoke to the press. In a rare 2006 interview, she said her greatest achievement was creating Phantasmagoria, though she expressed her love of the King's Quest series for its influence on her early career. Williams said that her role as a game designer was in the past, and that she was focused on writing a historical novel. She has also focused on travel, becoming an avid sailor with her husband.

In 2011, the video game website Gamezebo reported that she had returned from her sabbatical as a design consultant on the social network game Odd Manor, for Facebook. By 2012, Replay Games had recruited Sierra veterans Al Lowe and Paul Trowe to return to the Leisure Suit Larry adventure game series, which led Trowe to try to persuade the Williamses to return to the game industry. Activision hired Telltale Games to develop a new entry in the King's Quest series. Williams declined to work on the game, but did offer some advice. The game was later canceled in 2013. Activision attempted to revive the Sierra brand in 2014, leading developer The Odd Gentlemen to create King's Quest: A Knight to Remember. According to the studio, they consulted with Roberta Williams "to make a game like they would make if they had continued making adventure games".

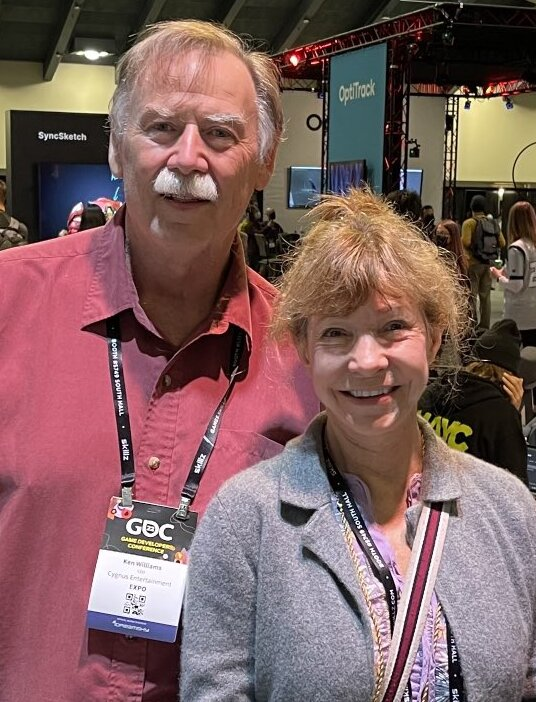
Roberta and Ken Williams at the Game Developers Conference in 2022

In 2019, Vancouver Film School announced The Roberta Williams Women in Game Design Scholarship, in partnership with game studios The Coalition and Blackbird Interactive. In 2021, Williams self-published her first novel Farewell to Tara, set in mid-1800s Ireland during the time of the Great Famine.

Roberta and Ken announced plans to return to game development in June 2021, in collaboration with artist Marcus Maximus Mera. In an interview that same year, she expressed caution that a veteran game designer could successfully return to the industry after an extended break, saying there are merits to ending one's career at its peak. In 2022, the team revealed that their new studio Cygnus Entertainment was creating a remake of Colossal Cave Adventure titled Colossal Cave 3D Adventure. Roberta explained that this pioneering game from the 1970s had inspired her career, and she was excited to re-imagine it as an interactive 3D experience.

== Legacy and accolades ==
In 1995, Next Generation included Roberta Williams among their list of 75 power players in the game industry. Computer Gaming World also ranked her as tenth on their 1997 list of the most influential people in computer gaming, praising her impact on the design of adventure games. GameSpot likewise ranked her number ten on their 1999 list of "the most influential people in computer gaming of all time" for "pushing the envelope of graphic adventures" and being "especially proactive in creating games from a woman's point of view and titles that appealed to the mainstream market, all the while integrating the latest technologies in graphics and sound wherever possible". In 2009, IGN included both her and Ken in the 23rd position on the list of top game creators of all time, highlighting their role in co-founding Sierra as "the company behind some of the best and most well known adventure games of the '80s and '90s".

Computer Gaming World inducted Roberta Williams into their Hall of Fame in 2011. Both Roberta and Ken were given an Industry Icon Award at the Game Awards in 2014. She also earned the Pioneer Award at the 20th Game Developers Choice Awards in March 2020, for her influential work in the graphical adventure game genre with Mystery House, as well as her role in creating the King's Quest series and co-founding Sierra.

Ken Williams has described her as a perfectionist, "extremely smart, intuitive and usually right. She can't be managed." Ars Technica has called her "one of the more iconic figures in adventure gaming", noting her as one of the first well-known female game designers, and praising her writing and design work on Phantasmagoria and the King's Quest series. Smithsonian magazine has noted her as a pioneer of graphic adventure games, for creating the first home computer game to include graphics. Several publications have referred to her as "the Queen of adventure games".

Roberta Williams has personally inspired the characters and artwork of other games. She posed for the cover of the game Softporn Adventure by Chuck Benton, published by On-Line Systems. She posed much later with her children as Mother Goose for the cover photograph of Mixed-Up Mother Goose. She also makes a cameo appearance in Leisure Suit Larry 3, where Larry interrupts her while "directing" a scene for King's Quest IV. Ellie Williams, protagonist of the video game series The Last of Us, is named for Ken and Roberta. She was also a source of inspiration for the character of Cameron Howe in the AMC television drama Halt and Catch Fire. The Williams family donated a collection of design materials to the International Center for the History of Electronic Games.

== Works ==
=== Games ===
- Mystery House (1980)
- Wizard and the Princess (1980)
- Mission Asteroid (1981)
- Time Zone (1982)
- The Dark Crystal (1983)
- King's Quest I: Quest for the Crown (1984)
- Mickey's Space Adventure (1984)
- King's Quest II: Romancing the Throne (1985)
- King's Quest III: To Heir Is Human (1986)
- Mixed-Up Mother Goose (1987)
- King's Quest IV: The Perils of Rosella (1988)
- Laura Bow: The Colonel's Bequest (1989)
- King's Quest V: Absence Makes the Heart Go Yonder! (1990)
- King's Quest 1: Quest for the Crown (Remake) (1990)
- Mixed-Up Mother Goose Multimedia (1990)
- Laura Bow in The Dagger of Amon Ra (1992)
- King's Quest VI: Heir Today, Gone Tomorrow (1992)
- King's Quest VII: The Princeless Bride (1994)
- Mixed-Up Mother Goose Deluxe (1995)
- Phantasmagoria (1995)
- Shivers (1995)
- King's Quest: Mask of Eternity (1998)
- Odd Manor (2014)
- Colossal Cave – Remake (2023)

=== Novels ===
- Farewell to Tara (2021)
