= Cranston Manor =

1981 video game

- Developer: On-Line Systems
- Publisher: On-Line Systems
- Designers: Larry Ledden; Harold DeWitz; Ken Williams
- Series: Hi-Res Adventures
- Engine: ADL
- Platforms: Apple II, FM-7, PC-88, PC-98
- Release: July 1981: Apple II; NA: July 1981; FM-7; JP: 1983; PC-88, PC-98; JP: October 1983
- Genre: Graphic adventure
- Mode: Single-player

Cranston Manor is a graphic adventure published for the Apple II by On-Line Systems in 1981 and is Hi-Res Adventure #3. The player must invade a mansion that was occupied by a millionaire and steal the sixteen treasures that are inside of it. The game allows players to switch between graphics-based and text-based gameplay.

Cranston Manor is based on Larry Ledden's text adventure The Cranston Manor Adventure. The graphical version was programmed by Ledden, Ken Williams, and Harold DeWitz.

== Development ==
Larry Ledden wrote The Cranston Manor Adventure as text-only interactive fiction for the Atari 8-bit computers. It was published by Artworx in 1981. Sierra On-Line acquired the rights from Ledden to create a graphical version which was published as Cranston Manor for the Apple II. Ledden was paid royalties, but did not receive credit in Sierra's version.
