= Time Zone (video game) =

1982 video game

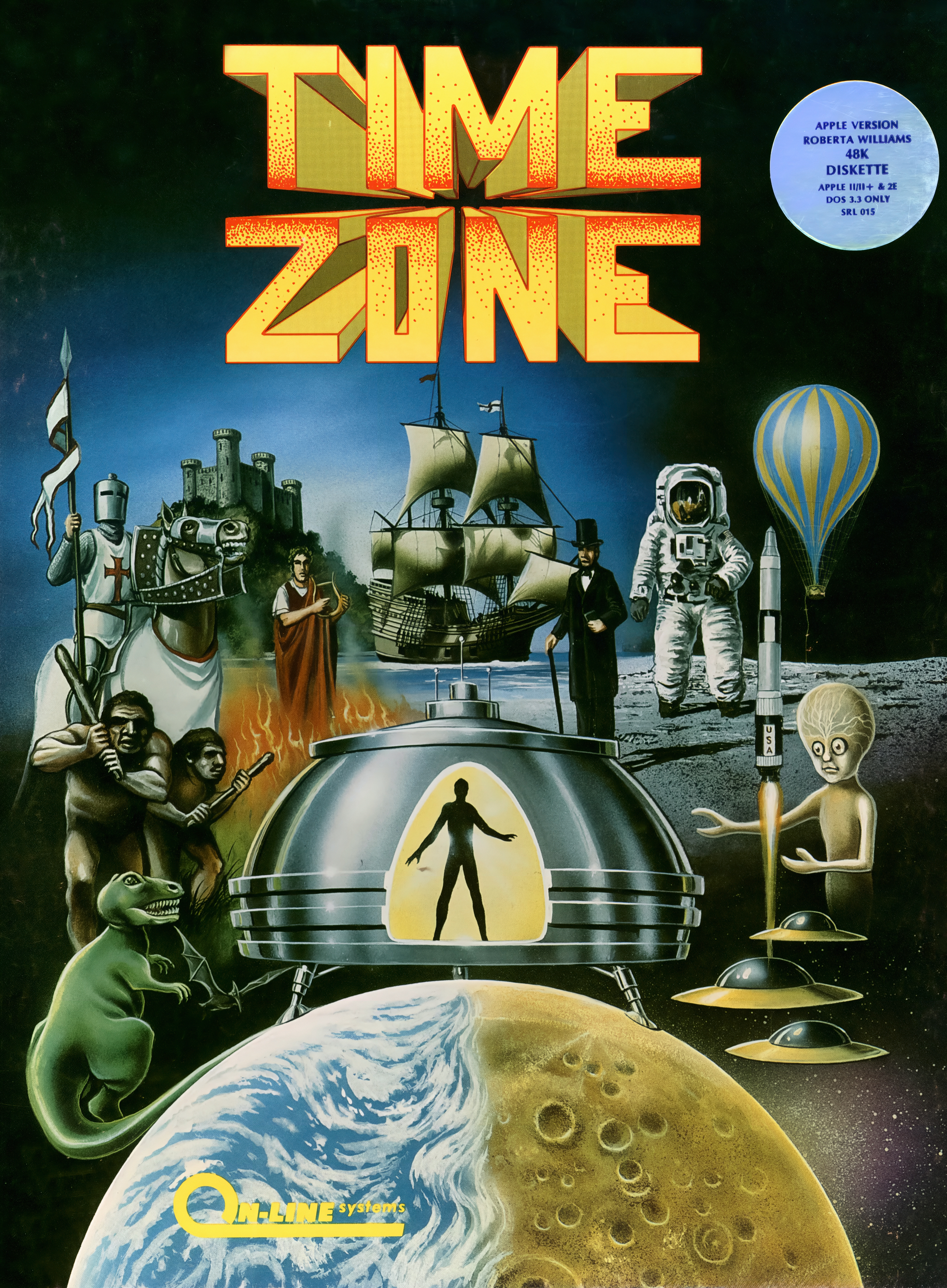
- Developer: On-Line Systems
- Publisher: On-Line Systems
- Director: Roberta Williams
- Programmers: Rorke Weigandt; Drew Harrington; Eric Griswold
- Artists: Terry Pierce; Michelle Pritchard; Barry Blosser
- Writer: Roberta Williams
- Series: Hi-Res Adventure
- Engine: ADL
- Platforms: Apple II, FM-7, PC-88, PC-98
- Release: February 1982 (Apple II); 1985 (ports)
- Genre: Adventure
- Mode: Single-player

Time Zone is a multi-disk graphical adventure game written and directed by Roberta Williams for the Apple II. Developed in 1981 and released in 1982 by On-Line Systems (later Sierra Entertainment), the game was shipped with six double-sided floppy disks and contained 1,500 areas (screens) to explore along with 39 scenarios to solve. Produced at a time when most games rarely took up more than one side of a floppy, Time Zone is one of the first games of this magnitude released for home computer systems. Ports were released for Japanese home computers PC-88, PC-98 and FM-7 in 1985.

== Gameplay ==
Time Zone allows players to travel through time and across the globe solving puzzles while meeting famous historical figures such as Benjamin Franklin, Cleopatra, and Julius Caesar. The game has static pictures and a text parser that understands two-word commands.

== Development ==
The game used the company's existing Hi-Res Adventures engine. Roberta Williams was the designer and writer, and its development took six months and about ten other people—the first example of the modern video game-development model in which programmers, artists, and designers are separate people in a team larger than a few people—worked on the game for a year. Each of the more than 1,300 locations had its own artwork. The company hoped to release Time Zone before Christmas 1981, but did not do so until March 1982. Because of the game's difficulty, Sierra offered a telephone help line that players could call for hints.

== Reception ==
BYTE wrote "The Guinness Book of World Records must be getting ready for a computer game category, if Time Zone is any indication of things to come. Without a doubt, it is the longest adventure game to date". The game received a Certificate of Merit in the category of "Best Computer Adventure" at the 4th annual Arkie Awards.

Williams' brother-in-law and fellow employee, John, later said, "It frankly wasn't that good". Time Zone sold poorly; the original retail price of US$99 (equivalent to $330 in 2025) may make it the most expensive computer game in history after inflation. The game was reissued the year of its release as part of the short-lived SierraVentures line.
