= List of Hi-Res Adventures video games =

Hi-Res Adventures is a series of graphic adventure games developed by On-Line Systems (later Sierra Entertainment). It includes all seven graphic adventure games released by the company prior to the release of the company's landmark King's Quest.

- Hi-Res Adventure #0 - Mission Asteroid (1980)
- Hi-Res Adventure #1 - Mystery House (1980)
- Hi-Res Adventure #2 - Wizard and the Princess / Adventure in Serenia (1980)
- Hi-Res Adventure #3 - Cranston Manor (1981)
- Hi-Res Adventure #4 - Ulysses and the Golden Fleece (1981)
- Hi-Res Adventure #5 - Time Zone (1982)
- Hi-Res Adventure #6 - The Dark Crystal (1983)
