= Ulysses and the Golden Fleece =

1981 video game

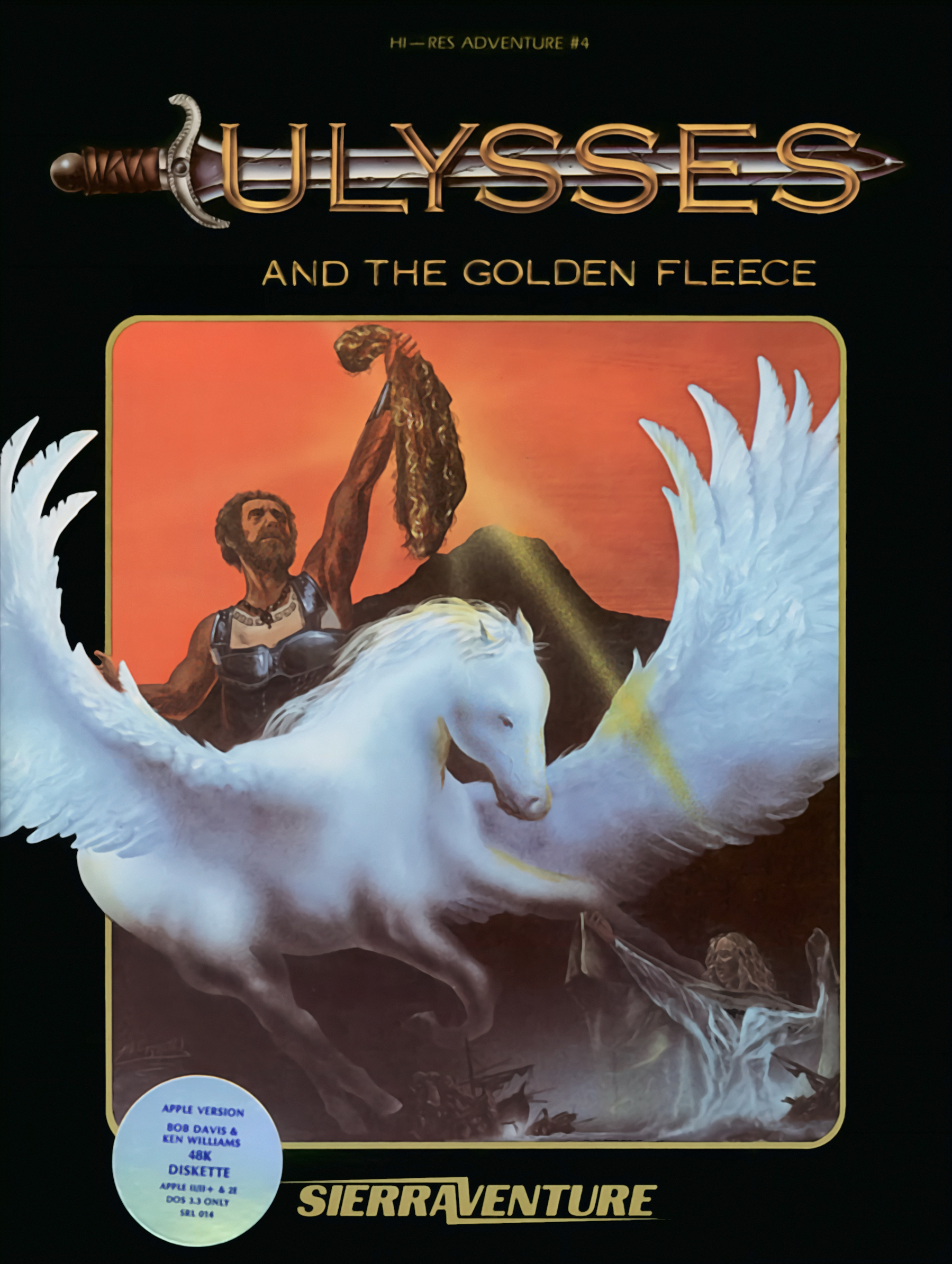
- Developer: Sierra On-Line
- Publisher: Sierra On-Line
- Designers: Bob Davis; Ken Williams
- Series: Hi-Res Adventure
- Engine: ADL
- Platforms: Apple II, Atari 8-bit, Commodore 64, IBM PC
- Release: 1981: Apple; 1982: Atari, IBM PC; 1984: C64
- Genre: Adventure
- Mode: Single-player

Ulysses and the Golden Fleece is a graphic adventure released by Sierra On-Line in 1981 for the Apple II. It was created by Bob Davis and Ken Williams as part of the Hi-Res Adventure series. With a still image displayed in the upper portion of the game screen, the player interacts the via a two-word command parser. The game was ported to the Atari 8-bit computers, Commodore 64, and IBM PC.

== Reception ==
PC Magazine rated Ulysses 14.0 out of a total of 18 points. It called the graphics "gorgeous", but noted the limited text parser compared to Infocom's Infidel.
