= Ken Williams (game developer) =

American video game programmer (born 1954)

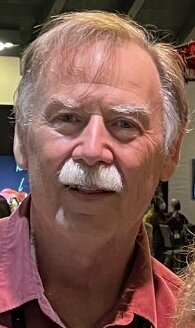
- Williams in 2022
- Born: October 30, 1954 (age 72); Evansville, Indiana, U.S.
- Occupations: Businessman, game programmer
- Spouse: Roberta Heuer (m. 1972)
- Children: 2
- Website: kensblog.com

Kenneth A. Williams (born October 30, 1954) is an American businessman and game programmer who co-founded On-Line Systems together with his wife Roberta Williams. On-Line Systems eventually became Sierra On-Line and was ultimately renamed Sierra Entertainment. The couple were leading figures in the development of graphical adventure games. At its height, Sierra employed nearly 1,000 people prior to its acquisition in 1996.

== History ==
=== Early years ===
Williams was born on October 30, 1954, in Evansville, Indiana but later grew up in Simi Valley, California. Ken and Roberta's early contributions to the computer game industry were partially chronicled in the book Hackers: Heroes of the Computer Revolution. He wrote the textbook Apple II Computer Graphics and articles for Softline.

=== Sierra On-Line ===
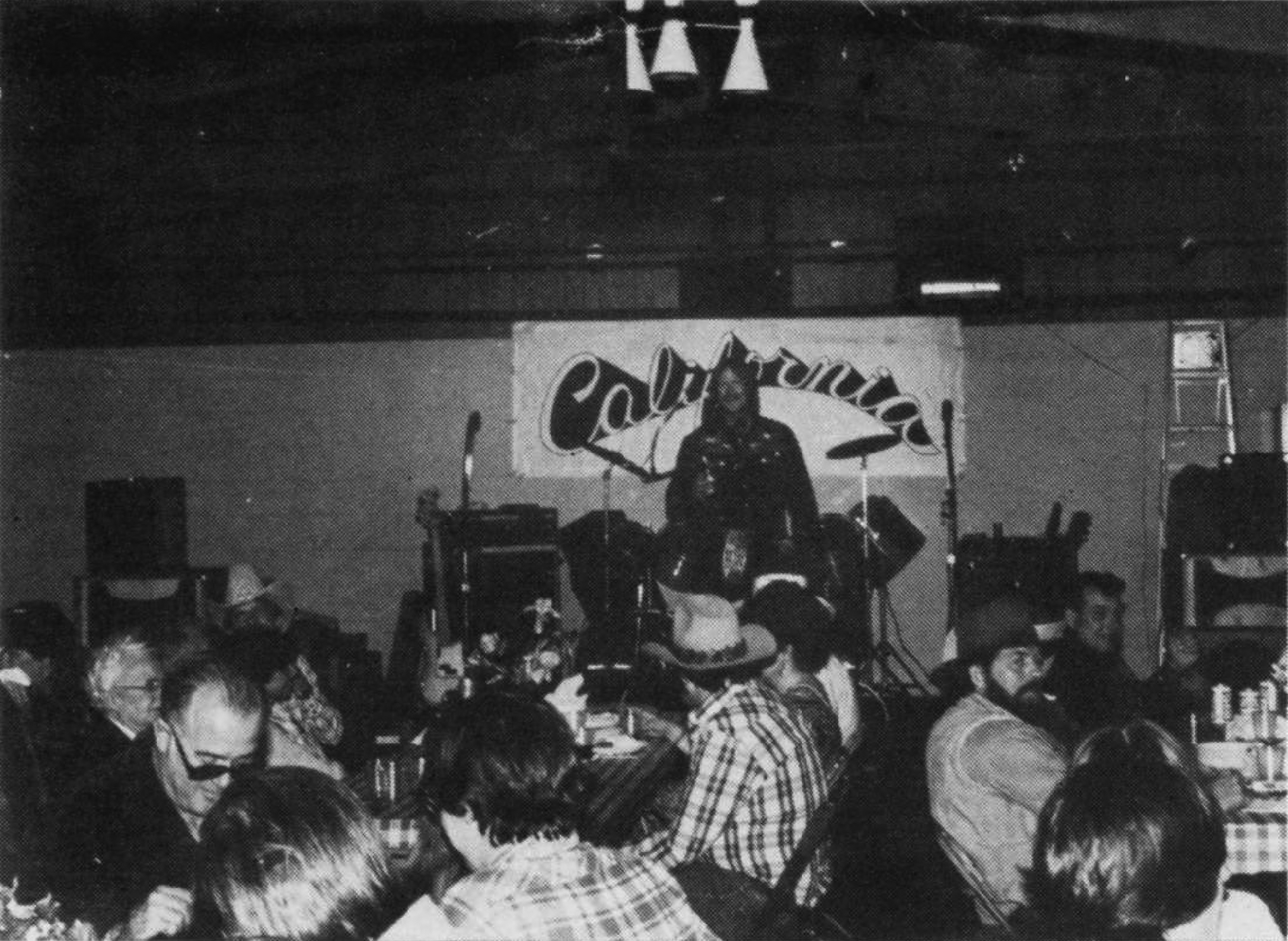
Williams addressing a crowd, 16 May 1981, On-Line Systems first year Western Dinner/Dance

Williams and wife Roberta co-founded On-Line Systems in 1979. Sierra's notable online service, the ImagiNation Network, was purchased by AT&T in 1994. Ken Williams served as the president of Sierra until July 1996, when the company was sold to CUC International. He stayed on to guide its strategic direction until November 1997.

In his role as Sierra's CEO, Williams focused on innovation: "I'm not sure how typical I am of other CEOs ...most of my time is spent looking at product ... To me, everything is about being able to build awesome product ... Any game which does not push the state of the art leaves an opportunity for a competitor's game to look better."

In Sierra's later years, the company's focus had shifted to publishing many titles from other studios, including Valve's Half-Life. Commenting on first-person shooters, Williams recalls, "By the time I decided we wanted into the genre, we were too far behind. With 20/20 hindsight, I blew it when I had the chance to buy id and didn't ... Valve was the first group I had spoken with that could put Sierra in front of id."

In 1992, Williams advocated for a software rating system akin to that of the movie industry. This preceded the establishment of the Entertainment Software Rating Board (ESRB) in 1994 by the Entertainment Software Association (ESA), which was set up in response to concerns over violent and sexually explicit video games.

In 2014, Ken and Roberta were honored with the Game Awards inaugural Industry Icons award.

Williams has cited Microsoft and The Walt Disney Company as influencing Sierra's business model. "These two companies were our role models. I read every book written on both companies. I did everything to try to understand how they thought, and how they did business."

=== Recent years ===
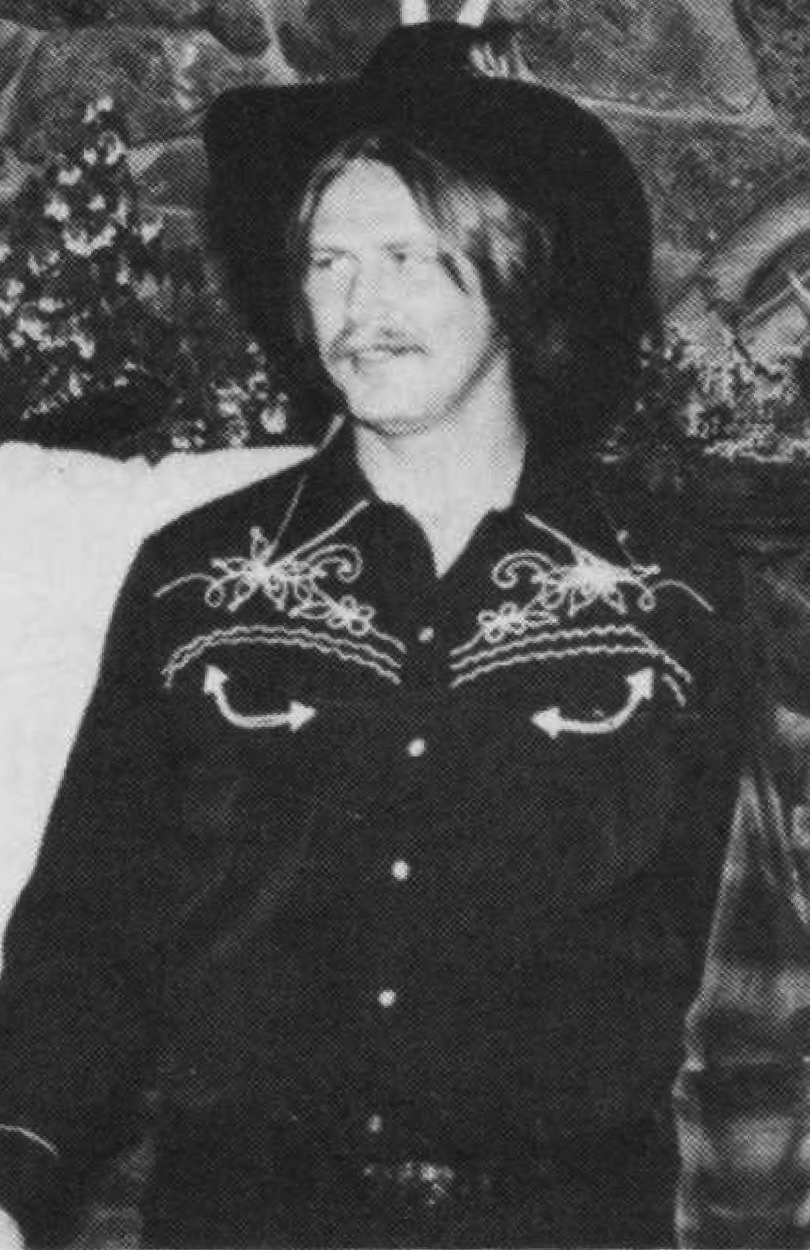
Ken Williams, 16 May 1981, On-Line Systems first year Western Dinner/Dance

Microsoft currently owns the Sierra brand and its intellectual property, following the acquisition of Activision Blizzard in 2023.

After a spell of being inactive in the computer game industry, in 2022, it was reported that he was currently working with his wife Roberta on a new VR and flatscreen version of Colossal Cave 3D Adventure, a redux of the text-adventure title from 1977. Prior to this, he had focused on writing and managing a Web site construction tool called Talkspot, which aimed to redefine how small businesses communicated with their customers on the Internet. He has published three books on boating, talking about his worldwide cruising along with his wife Roberta on their 68-foot Nordhavn trawler. In addition, he publishes a blog about cruising, Ken's Blog, and his years at Sierra, Sierra Gamers. His memoir, Not All Fairy Tales Have Happy Endings: The Rise and Fall of Sierra On-Line, was released on July 24, 2020.

In June 2021, Williams announced that he and Roberta had been working on the game The Secret, in collaboration with artist Marcus Maximus Mera.

== Depictions ==
Williams's trademarks have been his mustache and hair. His appearance has inspired Sierra's designers for some sprites, honoring Williams with cameo appearances in some games. One of these "incarnations" is the chief Keneewauwau of the Nontoonyt natives and Williams, the annoying joke teller (both appearing in Leisure Suit Larry games), as well as a whipper in the "ScumSoft" company in Space Quest III, and Kenny the Kid in Freddy Pharkas: Frontier Pharmacist.

== Personal life ==
Ken married Roberta Williams at the age of 19. They have two children, D.J. (born 1973) and Chris (born 1979). The Williams family has homes in Seattle, France, and Mexico.

== Games programmed ==
- Mission Asteroid (1980)
- Mystery House (1980)
- Wizard and the Princess (1980)
- Cranston Manor (1981)
- Ulysses and the Golden Fleece (1981)
- Threshold (1981)
- The Dark Crystal (1983)
- King's Quest II: Romancing the Throne (1985)
- Space Quest: Chapter I – The Sarien Encounter (1986)
- The Black Cauldron (1986)
- Police Quest: In Pursuit of the Death Angel (1987)
- Leisure Suit Larry in the Land of the Lounge Lizards (1987)
- Colossal Cave (2023)
