= Wizard and the Princess =

1980 video game

- Atari 8-bit cover art
- Developer: On-Line Systems
- Publisher: On-Line Systems
- Designer: Roberta Williams
- Programmer: Ken Williams
- Series: Hi-Res Adventures; King's Quest
- Engine: ADL
- Platforms: Apple II, Atari 8-bit, IBM PC, PC-88, PC-98, FM-7, IBM PCjr, Commodore 64
- Release: September 1980: Apple II; NA: September 1980; Atari 8-bit; NA: 1981; IBM PC; NA: 1982; PC-88, PC-98; JP: May 1983; FM-7; JP: June 1983; IBM PCjr; NA: March 1984; Commodore 64; NA: 1984; UK: September 1985
- Genre: Adventure
- Mode: Single-player

Wizard and the Princess (also The Wizard and the Princess, with a leading article) is a graphic adventure game written for the Apple II and published in September 1980 by On-Line Systems. It is the second installment in the Hi-Res Adventures series after Mystery House. Unlike its predecessor, which featured monochrome drawings, Wizard and the Princess introduced color graphics. Ports for the Atari 8-bit computers and Commodore 64 were released in 1982 and 1984 respectively. The 1982 self-booting disk version for IBM PC compatibles was renamed Adventure in Serenia.

This game was one of the first graphical adventure games and served as a precursor to Sierra On-Line's King's Quest series.

== Plot ==
The game (according to the back cover [box/folder/manual] of the Atari 8-bit and Apple II original and rerelease versions) takes place in the land of Serenia where King George's daughter Princess Priscilla has been kidnapped by an evil wizard named Harlin. Harlin has held her inside his castle far in the mountains. The King has offered half of his kingdom to anyone brave enough to travel to the Wizard's castle, defeat him and return his daughter. The player assumes the role of a happy wanderer who answers this challenge.

The ports (Apple II, Atari 8-bit, and C64) contain additional plot added to the manual explaining how the wanderer made it to Serenia in the first place; some time long into the future after Harlin had been defeated by the Wanderer, he challenged the player to again repeat the actions leading to his defeat. He boasted of using his magic to change the world creating obstacles for anyone who would challenge him (he moved the desert around the village of Daventry, the northern sea splitting Serenia in two, and Great Mountains in the North on his half of the continent). He turned back the sands of time leaving the adventurer in the desert just outside the village of Serenia. He mocks the hero telling him that he may have been defeated once, but he couldn't be defeated a second time. The princess gives the hero some words of advice and a computer to help him defeat Harlin, and tells him he has become the wanderer (grandfather paradox and bootstrap paradox). The manual story as reprinted was also included with the Roberta Williams Collection (a compilation of games from Roberta Williams) and the King's Quest Collection Series (one of the compilations of King's Quest games).

The introduction for Adventure in Serenia explains that the adventurer, with the help of a computer, has magically transported to Serenia to save the princess.

== Development ==
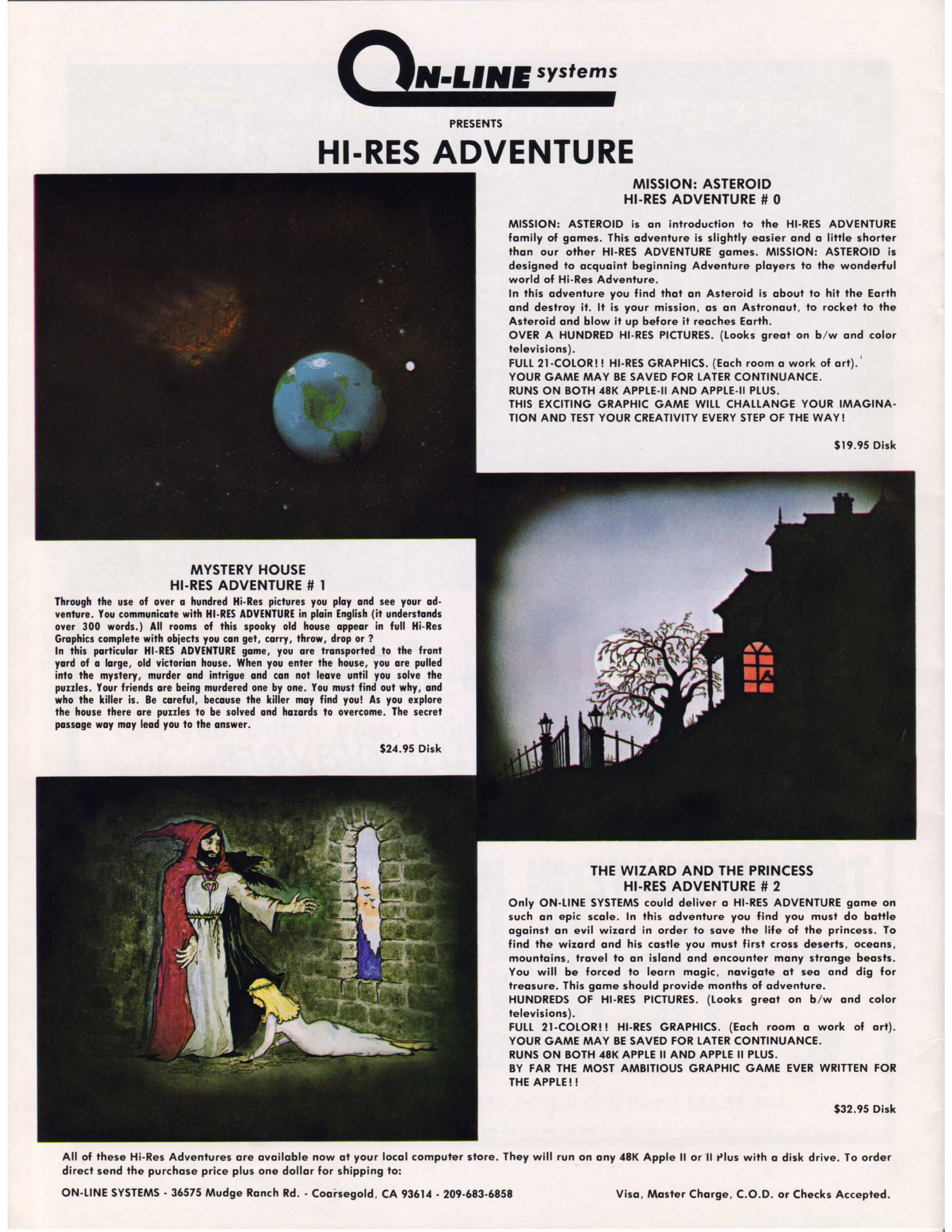
Advertisement from the June 1981 issue of The On-Line Letter for some of On-Line Systems' Hi-Res Adventure games, including Wizard and the Princess

As with their previous game Mystery House, Wizard and the Princess was distributed by Roberta and Ken Williams's company On-Line Systems in plastic bags with the 5¼-inch floppy disk and instruction sheet. The instruction sheet had the title listed as The Wizard and the Princess.

The story was based on the many fairy tales Roberta used to read as a child. The game improved upon Mystery House by adding color graphics. It was the first adventure game to have full-color graphics selling over 60,000 copies. The Apple II could only display six different colors simultaneously, but clever use of dithering made it possible to give the illusion of more colors on the screen.

== Ports ==
Wizard and the Princess was ported to the IBM PC in 1982, Sierra's first game for the PC platform. For unknown reasons, this version was re-titled Adventure in Serenia. Roberta Williams reputedly referred to the colors on the IBM PC as "atrocious" upon seeing the completed game running for the first time. Adventure in Serenia was a launch title for the IBM PCjr, announced in late 1983.

The Commodore 64 version uses more on-screen colors and solid colors and no dithering. The items in the game were more detailed, and alternate artwork used higher resolution. The game was ported to various Japanese computers by Starcraft, which completely redrew the artwork with more colors and higher resolution.

== Reception ==
Mark Marlow reviewed Mission: Asteroid, Mystery House, and The Wizard and the Princess for Computer Gaming World, and stated that "The Wizard and the Princess has the best graphics and has a beautiful fairy tale setting as its theme. Of the three it was the most challenging and should be attempted only after you are familiar with the gaming system".

Debuting in August 1980, the game sold 25,000 copies by June 1982, tied for fourth on Computer Gaming World's list of top sellers. It sold over 60,000 copies in total. Creative Computing liked Wizard and the Princess, approving of the Atari version's graphics and comparing its difficulty to "some of Scott Adams' efforts". The Addison-Wesley Book of Atari Software 1984 gave the game an overall B rating, stating that it "may well set a standard by which future graphic adventure games will be judged".

Ian Chadwick reviewed The Wizard and the Princess in Ares Magazine #11 and commented that "if you're any fan of computer adventures, then this is one of the most amazing, intriguing, fascinating, frustrating and graphically appealing adventures around".

== Legacy ==
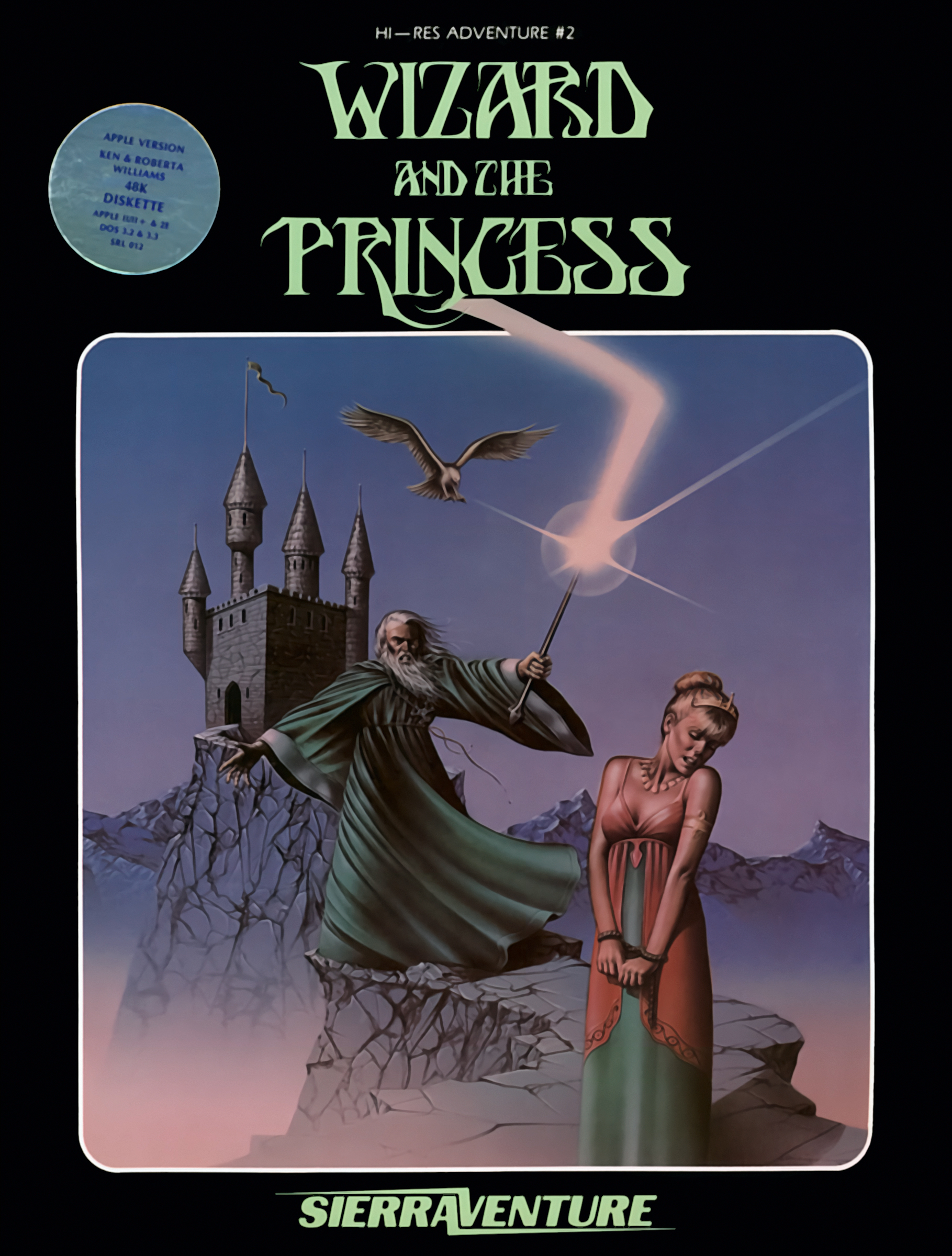
Apple and DOS version

Wizard and the Princess is recognized for pioneering color graphics, offering more detailed and vibrant visuals than previous games. This technological advancement not only enhanced player immersion but also influenced other developers, prompting a broader industry focus on graphical development.

According to Sierra's Interaction magazine, this game can be considered a prelude to the King's Quest series. King's Quest V marked a return to the Kingdom of Serenia. The events are mentioned and expanded upon in The King's Quest Companion, 2nd Edition. It mentioned that the wanderer, a barbarian, had turned down the offer of marriage after saving the princess. He journeyed into the desert and died. All that remained of him is his skeleton and a single leather shoe (a reference to KQ5). Princess Priscilla later married an individual named Kenneth the Huge and became the queen of Serenia, after her father's (King George IV) death. It was further referenced as part of the King's Quest series through a trivia question in the King's Questions game that came with certain versions of the King's Quest Collection.

The extended backstory for Wizard and the Princess in the rereleases helps to explain the geographic differences between the game, and later games in the King's Quest series (KQ3 and KQ5). In KQ5, Serenia and Daventry are part of the same continent. In KQ3, the continent consists mostly of Daventry only with most of the northern half of the continent missing as seen in maps and charts in the game. According to the Wizard and the Princess, Harlin had divided the continent of Serenia in two and transformed the geography to create obstacles for any adventurers trying to reach him and free the princess. Thus it explains why the desert surrounds the village in the earlier game, but not during the time of KQ5, or why the Great Mountains are located across the sea on Harlin's continent, but just north of the town in KQ5. By the time of KQ5, Harlin's magic was no longer active, and geography was restored. The King's Quest Companion places the events of Wizard and the Princess as having occurred several years before KQ5.
