= Mystery House =

1980 video game

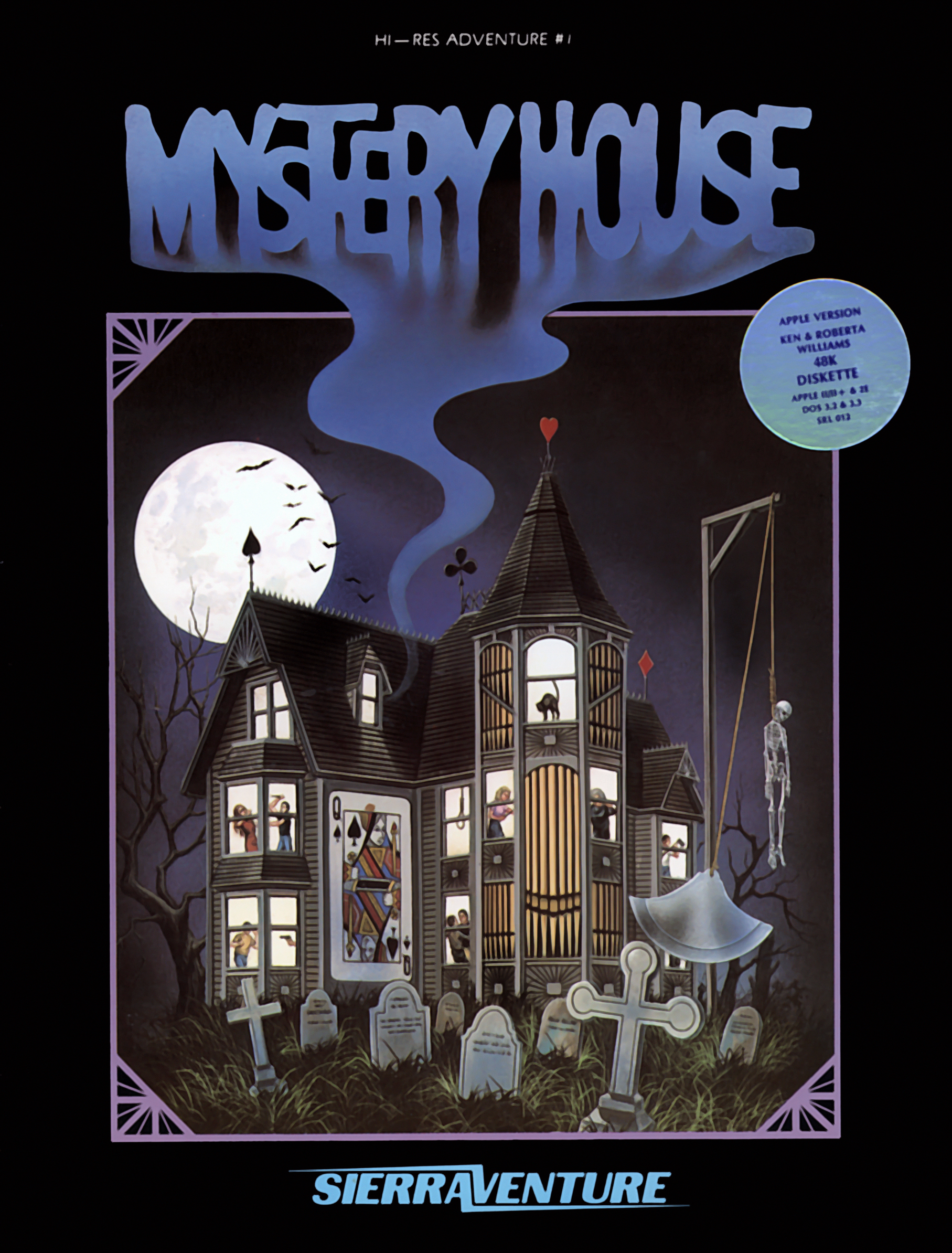
- 1982 re-release cover art
- Developer: On-Line Systems
- Publisher: On-Line Systems
- Designer: Roberta Williams
- Programmer: Ken Williams
- Series: Hi-Res Adventures
- Engine: ADL
- Platforms: Apple II: PC-88; PC-98; FM-7; iOS
- Release: May 5, 1980: Apple II; US: May 5, 1980; PC-88, PC-98; JP: April, 1983; FM-7; JP: 1983; iOS; WW: March 10, 2009
- Genre: Adventure
- Mode: Single-player

Mystery House is an adventure game released by On-Line Systems on May 5, 1980. It was designed, written and illustrated by Roberta Williams, and programmed by Ken Williams for the Apple II. Mystery House is the first graphical adventure game and the first game produced by On-Line Systems, the company which would evolve into Sierra On-Line. It is one of the earliest horror video games.

== Plot ==
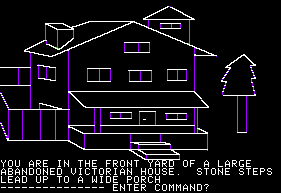
The opening scene

The game starts near an abandoned Victorian mansion. The player is soon locked inside the house with no other option than to explore. The mansion contains many interesting rooms and seven other people: Tom, a plumber; Sam, a mechanic; Sally, a seamstress; Dr. Green, a surgeon; Joe, a grave-digger; Bill, a butcher; Daisy, a cook.

Initially, the player has to search the house in order to find a hidden cache of jewels. Soon, dead bodies (of the other people) begin appearing and it is obvious there is a murderer on the loose in the house. The player must discover who it is or become the next victim.

== Development and release ==
At the end of the 1970s, Ken Williams sought to set up a company for enterprise software for the market-dominating Apple II computer. One day, he took a teletype terminal to his house to work on the development of an accounting program. Looking through a catalog, he found a game called Colossal Cave Adventure. He bought the game and introduced it to his wife, Roberta, and they both played through it. They began to search for something similar but found the market underdeveloped. Roberta decided that she could write her own, and conceived of the plot for Mystery House, taking inspiration from Agatha Christie's novel And Then There Were None. She was also inspired by the board game Clue, which helped to break her out from a linear structure to the game.

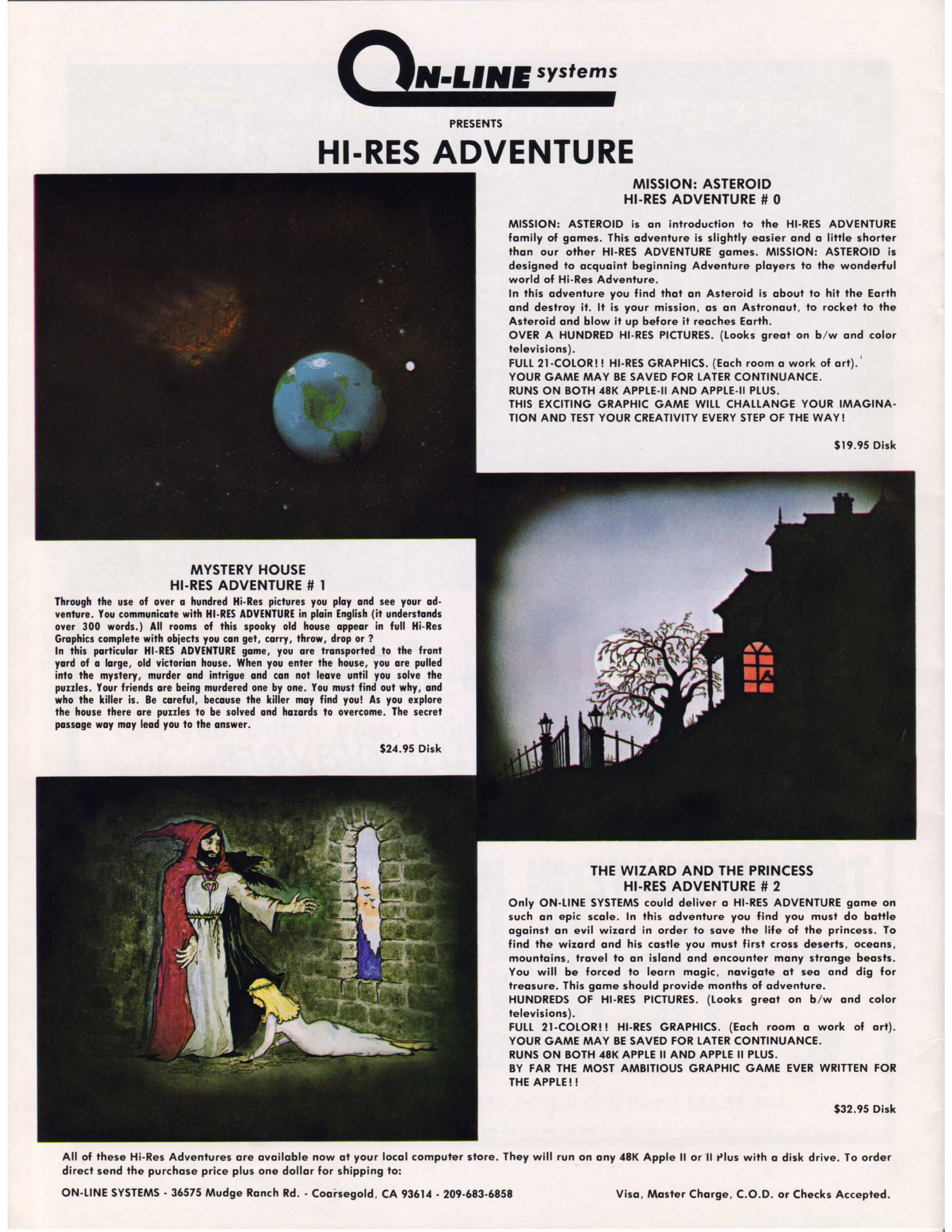
Advertisement from the June 1981 issue of The On-Line Letter for some of On-Line Systems' Hi-Res Adventure games, including Mystery House

Recognizing that though she knew some programming, she needed someone else to code the game, she convinced her husband to help her. Ken agreed and borrowed his brother's Apple II computer to write the game on. Ken suggested that adding graphical scenes to the otherwise text-based game would make it more interesting for players, and the couple bought a VersaWriter machine, on which users can trace over a line drawing and convert it to a digital drawing. Roberta drew seventy scenes for the game. Ken found, however, that the resulting digital drawings were too large to fit onto a 5¼-inch floppy disk, so he devised a way to convert the images into coordinates and instructions for the program to redraw the lines of the scenes rather than static images, as well as writing a better version of the VersaWriter scanning software. The resulting game is a text-based adventure with a depiction of the character's location displayed above the text. The game's code was completed in only a few days, and was finished on May 5, 1980. The couple took out an advertisement in Micro magazine as On-Line Systems, and mass-produced Ziploc bags containing a floppy disk and a sheet of instructions, to be sold at US$24.95 (equivalent to $97.49 in 2025).

== Reception and legacy ==
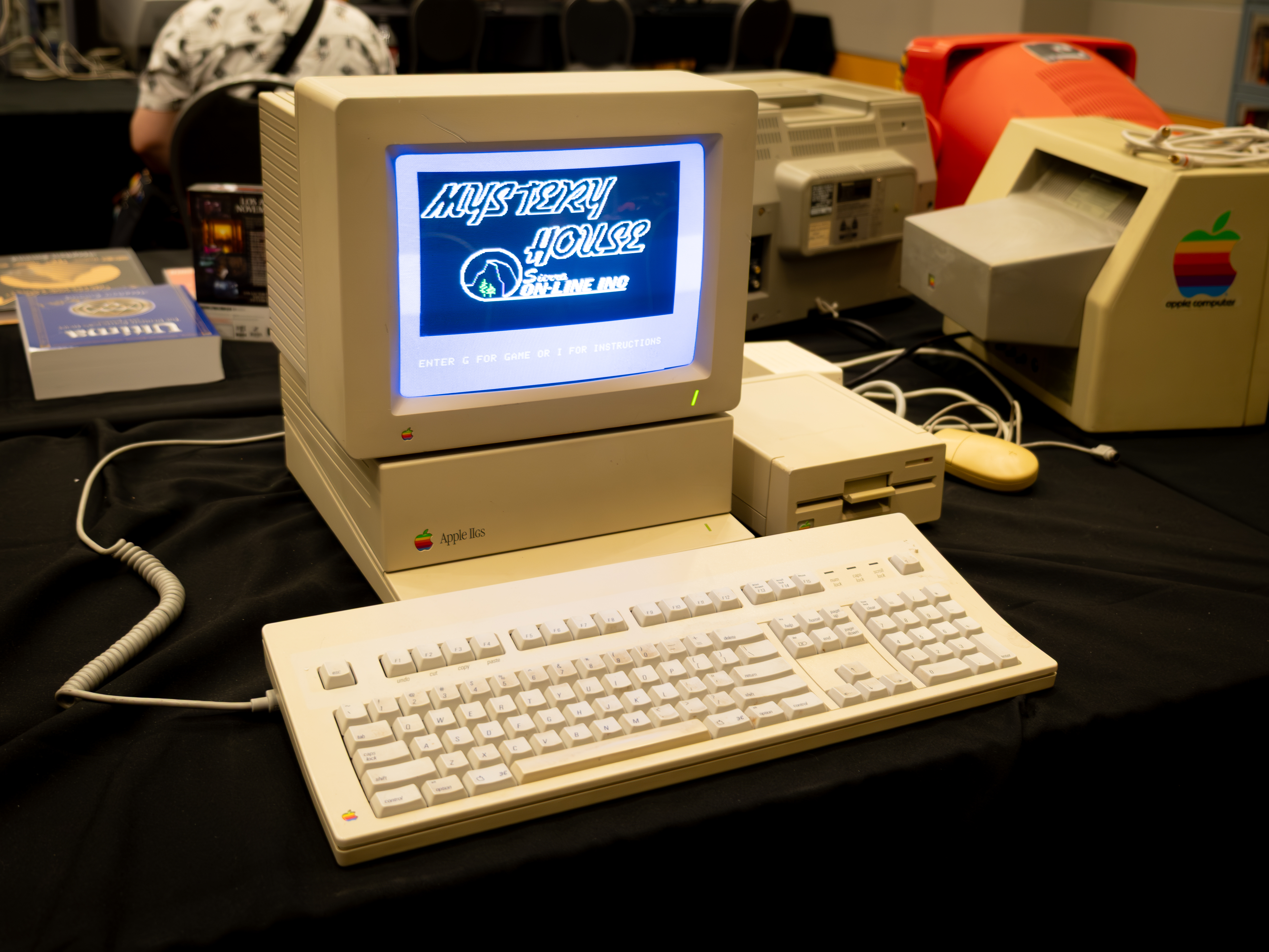
Apple IIGS running Mystery House

To the Williamses' surprise, what Roberta had initially considered a hobby project sold more than 10,000 copies through mail-order. Including its 1982 rerelease through the SierraVenture line, 80,000 units were eventually sold worldwide, making it one of the best-selling computer games at the time.

Mark Marlow reviewed Mission: Asteroid, Mystery House, and The Wizard and the Princess for Computer Gaming World, and stated that "Mystery House is considerably more difficult and provides many traps for the unwary in a wonderfully Victorian setting".

Computer Gaming World in 1996 ranked it fourth on the magazine's list of the most innovative computer games. GamePro named Mystery House the 51st most important game of all time in 2007, for introducing a visual component to adventure games and for featuring graphics at a time when most computer games did not. Though the game is often considered the first adventure game to use graphics, dungeon crawl role-playing video games such as pedit5 (1975) had already been using graphics prior to its release. Applying graphics to an adventure game, however, was unprecedented as previous story-based adventure games were entirely text-based.

Mystery House's success led the Williams to create the Hi-Res Adventures series, and note the game as Hi-Res Adventure #1. After the follow-on success of their next game, Wizard and the Princess, the pair moved into game development full-time, and On-Line Systems was incorporated in 1980 as Sierra On-Line. The game was later released into the public domain in 1987 as part of Sierra's seventh anniversary celebration.

In Japan, several different adventure games under the title Mystery House were released. In 1982, MicroCabin released Mystery House, which was unrelated to (but inspired by) the On-Line Systems game of the same name. The following year, the Japanese company Starcraft released an enhanced remake of On-Line Systems' Mystery House with more realistic art work and depiction of blood, for the NEC PC-6001 and PC-8801, while Mystery House II for the MSX was released as a sequel to MicroCabin's Mystery House. The Japanese versions of Mystery House had sales of 50,000 units, including 30,000 copies on the MSX and 20,000 copies on the PC-6001, PC-8001, PC-8801, PC-9801, FM-7, and X1 computers.

Mystery House was satirized in the 1982 adventure game Prisoner 2. One location from that game is a spooky house, where the player is told, "He's killed Ken!" and must seek absolution for murder. Elements from the game were later reintroduced in the Sierra On-Line game The Colonel's Bequest in 1989.

Mystery House is considered one of first such games where exploration of a strange house, where things are not what they may be seem, is a central element to the game. Other such games that include this type of narrative include the Resident Evil series, Gone Home, the Castlevania series and What Remains of Edith Finch.
