= Sierra Entertainment =

American video game company

Sierra Entertainment, Inc.
- Formerly: On-Line Systems; (1979–1982); Sierra On-Line, Inc.; (1982–2002)
- Type: Division
- Industry: Video games
- Founded: 1979; 47 years ago in Oakhurst, California
- Founders: Ken Williams; Roberta Williams
- Defunct: 2008; 18 years ago
- Fate: Folded into Activision
- Headquarters: Los Angeles, California, U.S.
- Products: List of games
- Parent: Vivendi Games (1996–2008); Activision (2008)
- Website: sierragames.com

Sierra Entertainment, Inc. (formerly On-Line Systems and Sierra On-Line, Inc.) was an American video game developer and publisher founded in 1979 by Ken and Roberta Williams. The company is known for pioneering the graphic adventure game genre, including the first such game, Mystery House (1980). It is known for its graphical adventure game series King's Quest, Space Quest, Police Quest, Gabriel Knight, Leisure Suit Larry, and Quest for Glory, and as the original publisher of Valve's Half-Life series.

After seventeen years as an independent company, Sierra was acquired by CUC International in February 1996 to become part of CUC Software. However, CUC International was caught in an accounting scandal in 1998, and many of the original founders of Sierra including the Williamses left the company. Sierra remained as part of CUC Software as it was sold and renamed several times over the next few years. Sierra was formally disestablished as a company and reformed as a division of this group in August 2004. The former CUC Software group was acquired by Vivendi and branded as Vivendi Games in 2006. The Sierra division continued to operate through Vivendi Games's merger with Activision to form Activision Blizzard on July 10, 2008, but was shut down later that year. The Sierra brand was revived by Activision in 2014 to re-release former Sierra games and some independently developed games.

Following the acquisition of Activision Blizzard by Microsoft, the Sierra brand is now owned by Microsoft through Xbox.

== History ==
=== Founding as On-Line Systems (1979–1982) ===
Original On-Line Systems logo

Sierra Entertainment was founded in 1979 as On-Line Systems in Simi Valley, California, by the husband-and-wife duo Ken and Roberta Williams. Ken, a programmer for IBM, had planned to use the company to create business software for the TRS-80 and Apple II. Ken had brought a teletype terminal home one day in 1979 and, while looking through the host system's software catalog, discovered the text adventure Colossal Cave Adventure. He encouraged Roberta to join him in playing it, and she was enthralled by the game. After Ken had brought an Apple II to their home, she played through other text adventures such as those by Scott Adams and Softape to study them. Dissatisfied with the text-only format, she realized that the graphics display capability of the Apple II could enhance the adventure gaming experience. With Ken's programming help, Roberta designed Mystery House, inspired by the novel And Then There Were None and the board game Clue, using text commands and printout combined with rudimentary graphics depicting the current setting.

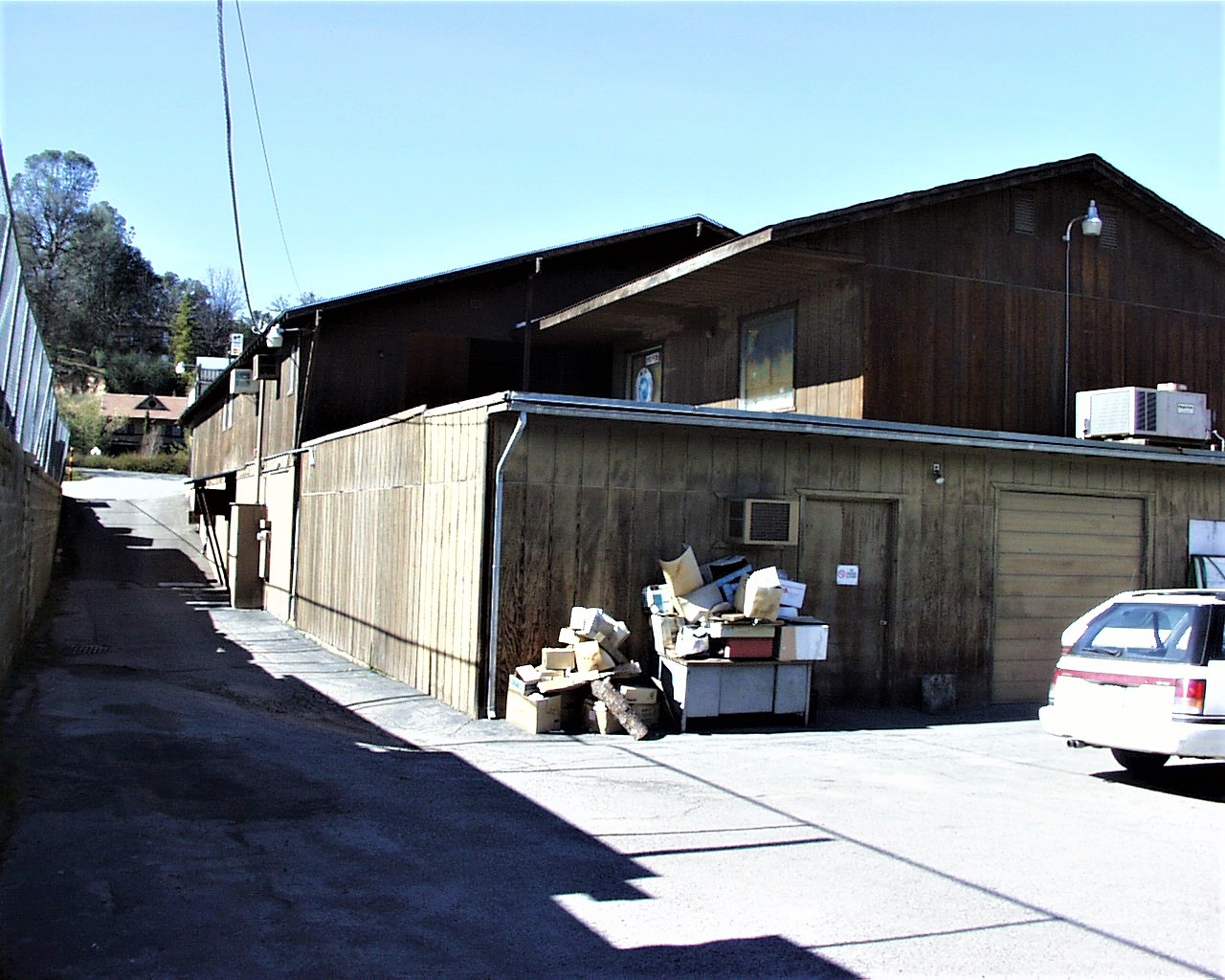
On-Line Systems' first office was a small space leased at the back of Ponderosa Printing.

Mystery House was released through mail-order in May 1980. It was an instant hit with about 15,000 copies sold, earning US$167,000 (equivalent to $653,000 in 2025). It is the first computer adventure game to have graphics, although made with crude, static, monochrome, line drawings. The two shifted the focus to developing more graphical adventure games. Mystery House became the first in the Hi-Res Adventure series. The Hi-Res Adventure series continued with Mission Asteroid, which was released as Hi-Res Adventure #0 though being the second release. The next release, Wizard and the Princess, also known as Adventure in Serenia, is considered a prelude to the later King's Quest series in both story and concept. Through 1981 and 1982, more games were released in the series including Cranston Manor, Ulysses and the Golden Fleece, Time Zone, and The Dark Crystal. A simplified version of The Dark Crystal, intended for a younger audience, was written by Al Lowe and released as Gelfling Adventure.

=== Rebranding to Sierra On-Line (1982–1988) ===
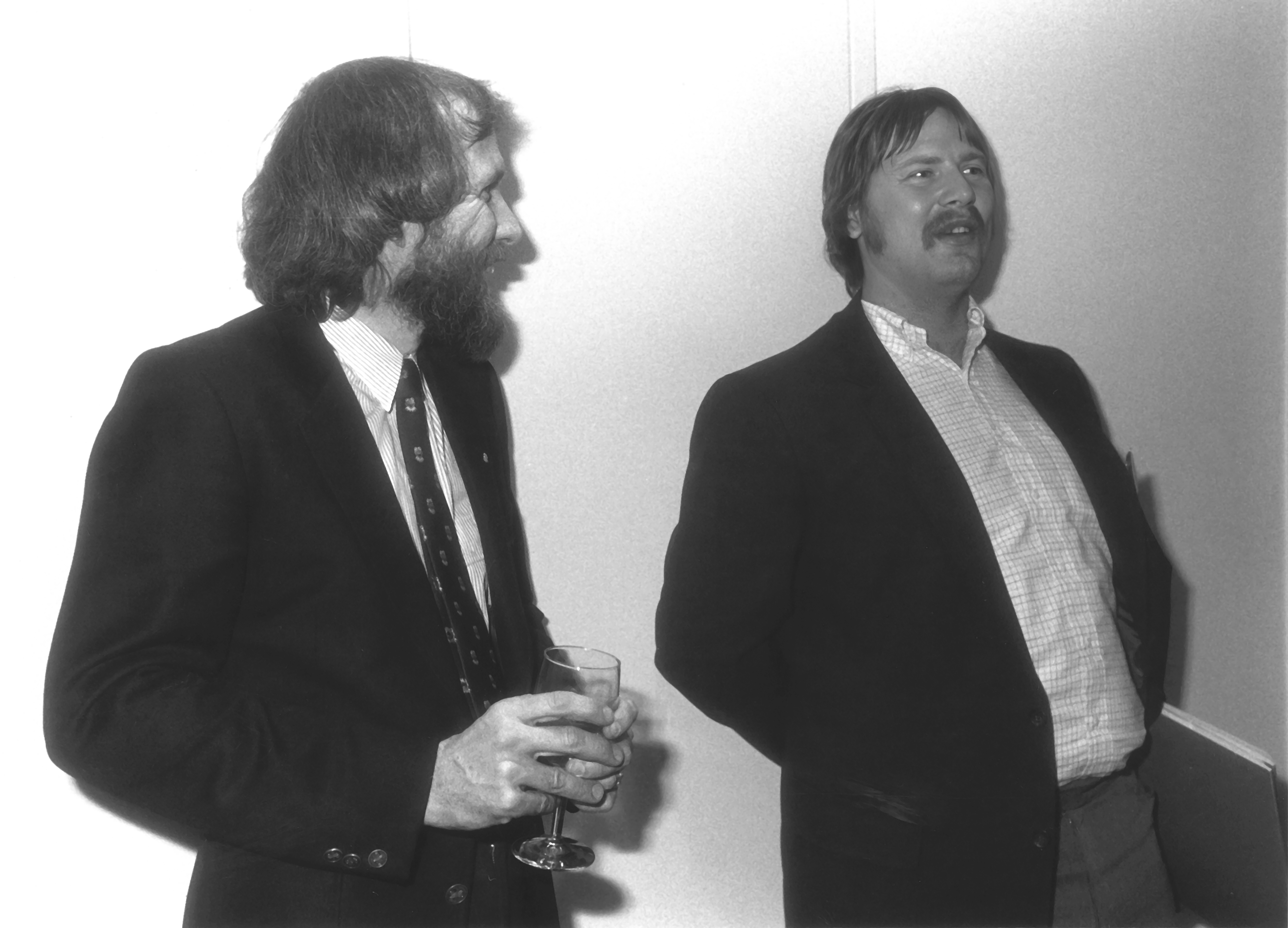
Jim Henson with Ken Williams, promoting The Dark Crystal game, inspired by Henson's 1982 fantasy film

On-Line Systems was renamed Sierra On-Line in 1982, and moved to Oakhurst, California. The "Sierra" name was taken from the Sierra Nevada mountain range that Oakhurst was near, and its new logo incorporated the imagery of Half Dome mountain. By early 1984, InfoWorld estimated that Sierra was the world's 12th-largest microcomputer software company, with $12.5 million in 1983 sales. It produced some non-game software, such as an Applesoft BASIC compiler.

The company weathered the video game crash of 1983 with only a 20% increase in sales, after analysts in 1982 had predicted a doubling in 1983 of the entire software market. The company had spent much of 1983 developing for the VIC-20 and the TI-99/4A which were both obsolete by the end of the year. Ken Williams was reportedly described as "bewildered by the pace at which computers come into and fall out of favor", and Williams said, "I've learned my lesson. I'm not moving until I understand the market better."

Many of Sierra's best known series began in the 1980s. In 1983, Sierra On-Line was contacted by IBM to create a game for the new PCjr. IBM offered to fund the entire development and marketing of the game, paying royalties. Ken and Roberta Williams accepted and started on the project. Roberta Williams created a story featuring classic fairy-tale elements. Her game concept includes animated color graphics, a pseudo 3D-perspective where the main character is visible on the screen, a more competent text parser that understands advanced commands from the player, and music playing in the background through the PCjr sound hardware. For the game, a complete development system called Adventure Game Interpreter (AGI) was developed. In mid-1984, King's Quest: Quest for the Crown was released to much acclaim, beginning the King's Quest series.

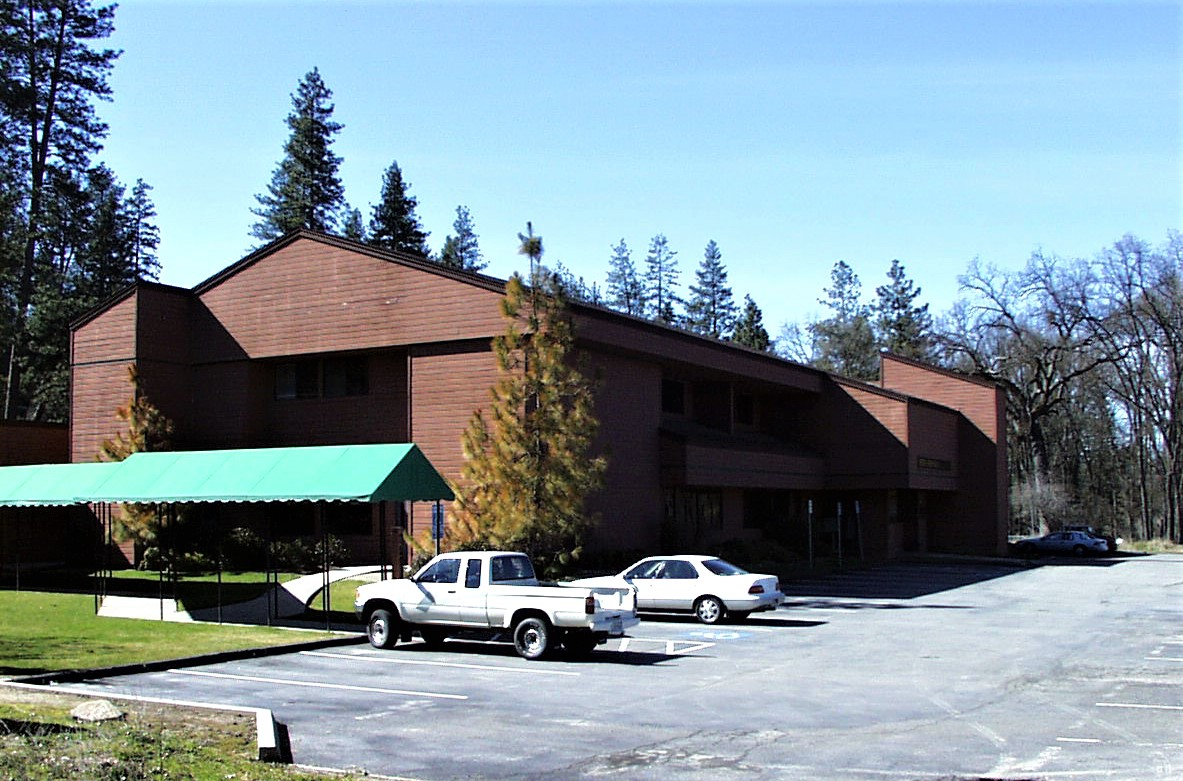
Sierra On-Line expanded into a larger headquarters in the early 1980s.

While finishing The Black Cauldron, programmers Mark Crowe and Scott Murphy began to plan for an adventure game of their own. After a simple demonstration to Ken Williams, he allowed them to start working on the full game, which was named Space Quest: The Sarien Encounter. The game was released in October 1986 as an instant success, spawning many sequels in the Space Quest series in the following years.

Al Lowe, who had been working at Sierra On-Line for many years, was asked by Ken Williams to write a modern version of Chuck Benton's Softporn Adventure from 1981, the only pure text adventure that the company had ever released. Leisure Suit Larry in the Land of the Lounge Lizards was a great hit and won the Software Publishers Association's Best Adventure Game award of 1987. It can be deduced that the game first became famous as an early example of software piracy, as Sierra sold many more hintbooks than actual copies of the game. A series of Leisure Suit Larry games followed.

Ken Williams befriended a retired highway patrol officer named Jim Walls and asked him to produce an adventure series based on a police theme. Walls proceeded to create Police Quest: In Pursuit of the Death Angel, which was released in 1987. Several sequels followed, and the series was touted for adherence to police protocol (relevant parts of which were explained in the games' manuals), and presenting some real-life situations encountered by Walls during his career as an officer.

Quest for Glory is a series of hybrid adventure/role-playing video games designed by Corey and Lori Ann Cole. The first game in the series, Quest for Glory: So You Want to Be a Hero, was released in 1989. The series combines humor, puzzle elements, themes and characters borrowed from various legends, puns, and memorable characters, creating a five-part series of the Sierra stable. Although the series was originally titled Hero's Quest, Sierra failed to trademark the name. Milton Bradley successfully trademarked an electronic version of their unrelated joint Games Workshop board game, HeroQuest, which forced Sierra to change the series' title to Quest for Glory. This decision caused all future games in the series, including newer releases of Hero's Quest I, to switch to the new name.

In 1987, Sierra On-Line started to publish its own gaming magazine, about its upcoming games and interviews with the developers. The magazine was initially named The Sierra Newsletter, The Sierra News Magazine, and The Sierra/Dynamix Newsmagazine. However, since Sierra Club already published a magazine called Sierra Magazine, the name of the magazine published by Sierra On-Line was changed to InterAction in 1991. It was discontinued in 1999.

Sierra's Adventure Game Interpreter engine, introduced with King's Quest, was replaced in 1988 with Sierra Creative Interpreter in King's Quest IV. The game was released under both engines, so those who had newer computers could use the new engine and better rendering technology.

=== Going public (1989–1995) ===
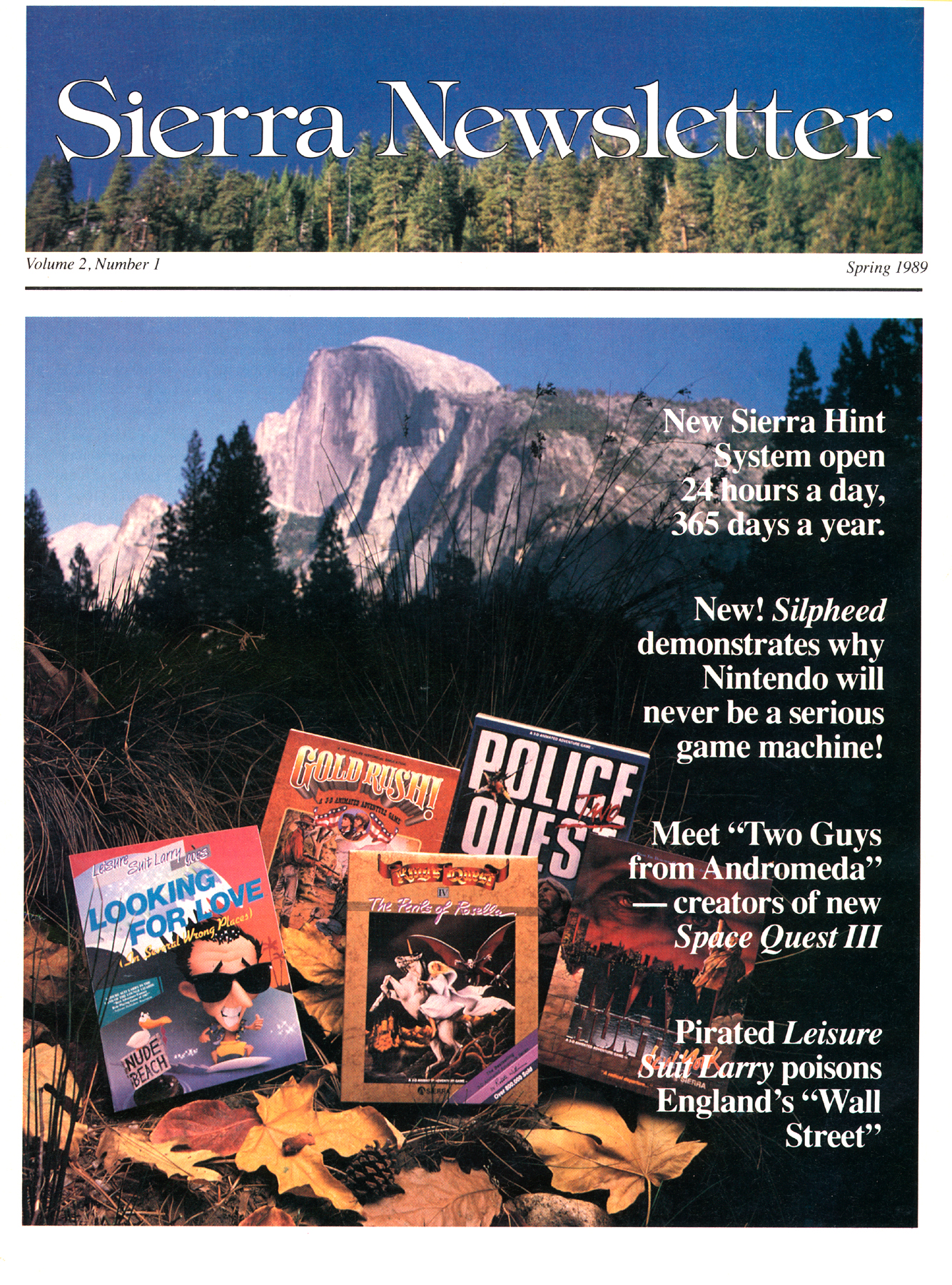
During the 1980s, the company emphasized developing and expanding popular franchises like King's Quest, Leisure Suit Larry, and Police Quest.

Sierra became a public company in 1989, trading on the NASDAQ under the stock ticker "SIER". Additional public investment allowed the company to engage in further acquisitions over the next several years.

In 1990, Sierra released King's Quest V, the first Sierra On-Line game ever to have more than 500,000 copies sold and the highest selling game for five years. It won several awards, such as the Best Adventure Game of the Year from both the Software Publishers Association and Computer Gaming World magazine.

The Sierra Network was launched on May 6, 1991, as the first game-only online environment. Development of the network began in 1989, as Ken Williams was inspired by the launch of the Prodigy service in 1988 to create something similar for Sierra's games. As a free service other than access use charges, the network provided a "land-based" precursor to MMORPGs and internet chat rooms, each land theme for the type of content provided multi-player gaming and category based bulletin boards and chat rooms throughout the continental United States. By July 1993, having reached about 40,000 subscribers, AT&T announced a plan to invest $5 million into the network and add more games, gaining partial control as part of its expansion into the growing online services. AT&T later took sole possession of the network on November 15, 1994, so the name was changed to the ImagiNation Network. The network failed to find a mass audience, and was sold to America On-Line in 1996.

In 1991, Sierra released the first game in the Dr. Brain series, Castle of Dr. Brain, a hybrid puzzle adventure education game, which has several sequels. In 1993, Gabriel Knight: Sins of the Fathers was released, beginning the Gabriel Knight series. The game and subsequent sequels were critically acclaimed in the mainstream press at the time.

Sierra and Broderbund started merger discussions in March 1991, but the idea was discontinued later that month.

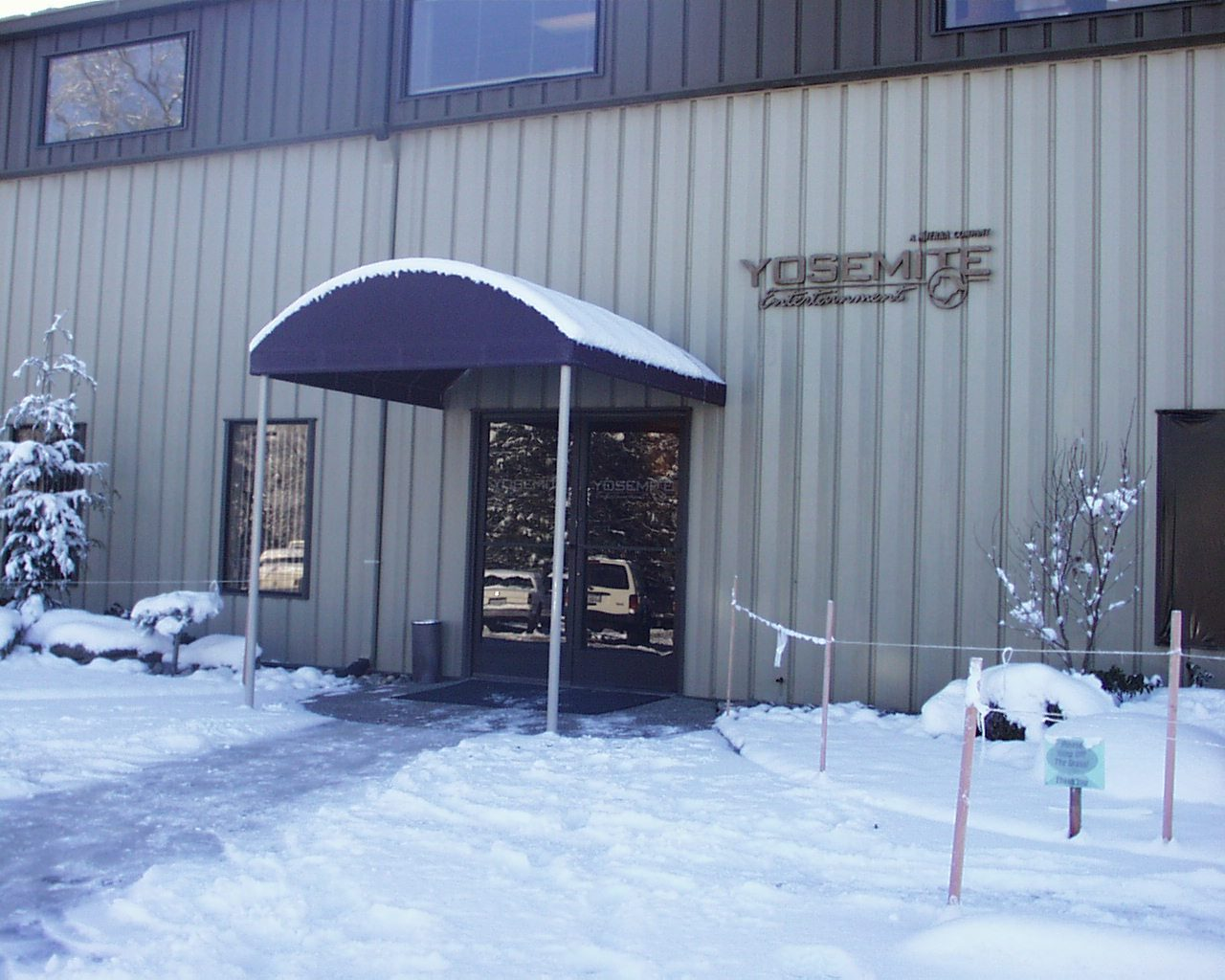
The Yosemite Entertainment headquarters in Oakhurst, California

Sierra needed a new building due to growth, and moved its headquarters and much of its key staff to Bellevue, Washington. Sierra's original location in Oakhurst was later renamed Yosemite Entertainment, and continued under that name until closing in early 1999.

The company was now made up of five separate and largely autonomous development divisions: Sierra Publishing, Sierra Northwest, Dynamix, Bright Star Technology, and Coktel Vision, with each group working separately on product development but sharing manufacturing, distribution, and sales resources.

1995 was a successful year for the company. Sierra was the market-share leader in PC games for the year. With $83.4 million in sales from software-publishing, earnings improved by 19 percent, and a net income of $11.9 million. In June, Sierra and Pioneer Electric Corp. signed an agreement to create a joint venture that would develop, publish, manufacture, and market entertainment software for the Japanese software market. This joint venture created a new company called Sierra Venture. With Sierra and Pioneer investing over $12 million, the new company immediately manufactured and shipped over twenty of Sierra's most popular products to Japan and created new titles for the Japanese market. 1995 also saw Sierra acquiring a number of development companies, both small home developers and larger companies.

Phantasmagoria was by far the largest project ever undertaken by Sierra. The anticipation for the game was high at release in late 1995. Although nearly one million copies were sold when the game was first released in August 1995, Sierra's bestselling adventure game created, the game received mixed reviews from industry critics.

=== Sale to CUC International (1996–1998) ===
In February 1996, early e-commerce pioneer CUC International, seeking to expand into interactive entertainment, offered to buy Sierra at a price of about $1.5 billion. Walter Forbes, the CEO of CUC International, and a member of Sierra's own Board of Directors since 1991, surprised Ken Williams with the deal after a board meeting. At this time, Sierra had modest revenues of about $158 million in the current fiscal year, so the sum surprised Ken. Forbes had posited the idea to Ken that this would be the start of a large company eventually to bring in LucasArts Entertainment, Broderbund, and Davidson & Associates (which at the time owned Blizzard Entertainment) under one entity and be a major publisher in the video game industry, as a great boon to the Williams and to Sierra's shareholders. Roberta had expressed her concerns about the offer to Ken and to executive officers, but he remained interested in the potential that Forbes offered. Ken accepted the offer, believing it was in the best interest for Sierra's future and stockholders, and CUC announced by the end of February 1996 the beginning of closing the acquisition of both Sierra and Davidson for $1.06 billion and $1.14 billion in CUC stock, respectively. The deal to obtain LucasArts and Broderbund failed.

Sierra's acquisition closed on July 24, 1996. The terms included naming Ken Williams a vice-chairman of CUC International, a Member of the Office of the President of CUC, and that he would remain responsible for Sierra's R&D and remain Sierra's CEO. He also requested creation of a "software board" consisting of him, Michael Brochu (Sierra's President and COO), Bob Davidson (founder and CEO of Davidson & Associates), and Forbes. It functioned as a governing body of what would become CUC Software, regulating major decisions and product lines.

In September 1996, CUC announced consolidation of some functions of its game companies into a single company called CUC Software Inc., headquartered in Torrance, California. Bob Davidson, founder and CEO of Davidson & Associates became the CEO for the publishing body. CUC Software consolidated manufacturing, distribution, and sales resources of all of divisions including what was to become Sierra, Davidson, Blizzard, Knowledge Adventure, and Gryphon Software.

CUC Software utilized its various labels' market specialties. For example, in October 1996, Sierra published Stay Tooned!, an adventure game developed by Funnybone Interactive (a subsidiary of Davidson & Associates) as Sierra was more known as an adventure game publisher than Davidson.

In November 1996, Ken Williams met with the founders of Valve and negotiated Sierra's exclusive rights to publish Half-Life, which Ken Williams debuted at E3 in May 1997. In December 1996, Sierra released The Realm Online, an online fantasy role-playing game. In December 1997, Sierra rebranded its Sierra Internet Gaming System (SIGS) as the World Opponent Network (WON), an online multiplayer gaming service providing matchmaking and authentication. WON officially launched in April 1998 and was used by games such as Half-Life, Counter-Strike, Homeworld, and other Sierra-published titles. The service reached 1.5 million users by March 1999.

After the sale, Ken Williams remained within the software division so that he could provide strategic guidance to Sierra, although he began to grow disillusioned as he soon found that his new titles at CUC meant very little and the software board met only once. He began disputes with Davidson over Davidson's conservative management style and his disdain for Sierra's more risque product lines such as Phantasmagoria and Leisure Suit Larry.

In January 1997, Davidson stepped down as CEO of CUC Software, and CUC Executive Chris MacLeod was named as his replacement. After this, Ken Williams shifted his focus work on CUC's online product distributor, NetMarket while remaining as CEO of Sierra in name only. In November, Ken Williams departed from CUC International, while Roberta Williams remained with Sierra until the release of King's Quest: Mask of Eternity in December 1998. Brochu, who had been hired in 1995 by Ken Williams, to handle the daily business affairs of Sierra, replaced Ken Williams and remained as President of Sierra until October 1997, when he too departed the company.

In April 1997, to further expand upon its role in the edutainment business, Sierra purchased Books That Work and CUC International purchased Berkeley Systems and transferred management of the studio to Sierra as an internal developer. In December 1997, in order to secure the rights to Return to Krondor, Sierra purchased PyroTechnix, who were developing the game.

On November 5, 1997, after the departure of Brochu in October, Sierra was split into three business units, all of which reported directly to MacLeod.

In 1998, Sierra divided into 5 sub-brands and corporate divisions:

- Sierra Attractions (for casual games such as poker) – composed of Berkeley Systems
- Sierra Home (for home/lifestyle software) – composed of Sierra's gardening, home design, and cooking software divisions
- Sierra Sports (for sports games) – composed of Dynamix's Sports Titles, Synergistic Software, and Papyrus
- Sierra Studios (general publishing division) – Composed of Sierra Northwest/Bellevue, Pyrotechnix, and Impressions Software
- Sierra FX (adventure games and online multiplayer games) – Based at Sierra's old headquarters in Oakhurst, which was publicly referred to as Yosemite Entertainment.

On November 24, 1997, Sierra published Diablo: Hellfire, the official expansion pack for the widely popular game Diablo developed by Synergistic Software, a division of Sierra.

On November 19, 1998, Sierra published Half-Life for the PC, developed by Valve, which became a huge success.

During these events, CUC merged with Henry Silverman's HFS Incorporated in December 1997 and became the Cendant Corporation. The merger did not immediately affect operations of Sierra. However, Silverman, who served as CEO of Cendant, had become more involved with the bookkeeping of the merged companies and noticed irregularities from CUC's past bookkeeping, leading to the discovery of massive accounting fraud at CUC in March 1998. Forbes was later convicted on three charges related to fraud by the Security and Exchange Commission in 2007. With the news, Cendant announced intention to sell the computer entertainment division, and on November 20, 1998, announced the sale of the consumer software division to Paris-based Havas S.A. Sierra became a part of Havas Interactive, the interactive entertainment division of the company.

=== Fallout from CUC's acquisition (1999–2003) ===
On Monday, February 22, 1999, Sierra announced a major reorganization of the company, resulting in the shutdown of several of their development studios, cutbacks on others and the relocation of key projects, and employees from those studios, to Bellevue. This event came to be known by fans and employees of Sierra as "Chainsaw Monday"—a nickname coined by Scott Murphy, who had been laid off over a month prior. About 250 people in total lost their jobs. Development groups within Sierra such as PyroTechnix were shut down. Others such as Books That Work were relocated to Bellevue. Also shut down was Yosemite Entertainment, the division occupying the original headquarters of Sierra On-Line. The company sold the rights of Headgate Studios back to the original owner. With the exception of the warehouse and distribution department, the entire studio was shut down. Game designers Al Lowe and Scott Murphy were laid off. Lowe had just started work on Leisure Suit Larry 8. Murphy was involved in a Space Quest 7 project at the time. Layoffs continued on March 1, when Sierra terminated 30 employees at the previously unaffected Dynamix, or 15 percent of its workforce.

Despite the layoffs, Sierra continued to publish games for smaller development houses. In September 1999, it released Homeworld, a real-time space-combat strategy game developed by Relic Entertainment. The game design was revolutionary for the genre, and the game received great critical acclaim and many awards.

UK-based game developer and publisher Codemasters, in an effort to establish themselves in the United States, announced the launch of a new development studio in Oakhurst, using the abandoned Sierra facilities and hiring much of the Yosemite Entertainment's laid-off staff in mid-September 1999. In early October, the company announced plans to take over management and maintenance of the online RPG The Realm and acquiring the complete yet previously canceled Navy SEALs. The company also reported it obtained the rights to continue using the name Yosemite Entertainment for the development house.

Meanwhile, Sierra announced another reorganization, this time into three business units: Core Games, Casual Entertainment, and Home Productivity. This reorganization resulted in even more layoffs, eliminating 105 additional jobs and a number of games in production. After 1999, Sierra almost entirely ceased to be a developer of games and, as time went on, instead became a publisher of games by independent developers.

At the end of June 2000, a strategic business alliance between Vivendi, Seagram, and Canal+ was announced, and Vivendi Universal, a leading global media and communications company, was formed after the merger with Seagram (the parent company of Universal Studios). Havas S.A. was renamed Vivendi Universal Publishing and became the publishing division of the new group, divided into five groups: games, education, literature, health, and information. The merger was followed by many more layoffs of Sierra employees.

In August 2001, Sierra announced a major reorganization, which included the closure of Dynamix as well as the layoffs of 148 employees located at the company headquarters in Bellevue.

On February 19, 2002, Sierra On-Line announced the name change to Sierra Entertainment, Inc.

In 2002, Sierra, working with High Voltage Software, announced the development of a new chapter in the Leisure Suit Larry franchise, titled Leisure Suit Larry: Magna Cum Laude. Released to mostly mixed to negative reviews; Larry's creator, Lowe, was not involved with the project.

The newly renamed Sierra Entertainment continued to develop mostly unsuccessful interactive entertainment products. However, hit Homeworld 2 once again cemented Sierra's reputation as a respectable publisher.

In 2003, Sierra Entertainment released the second video game adaptation of The Hobbit, as well as NASCAR Racing 2003 Season.

=== Acquisition and absorption under Vivendi Games (2004–2008) ===
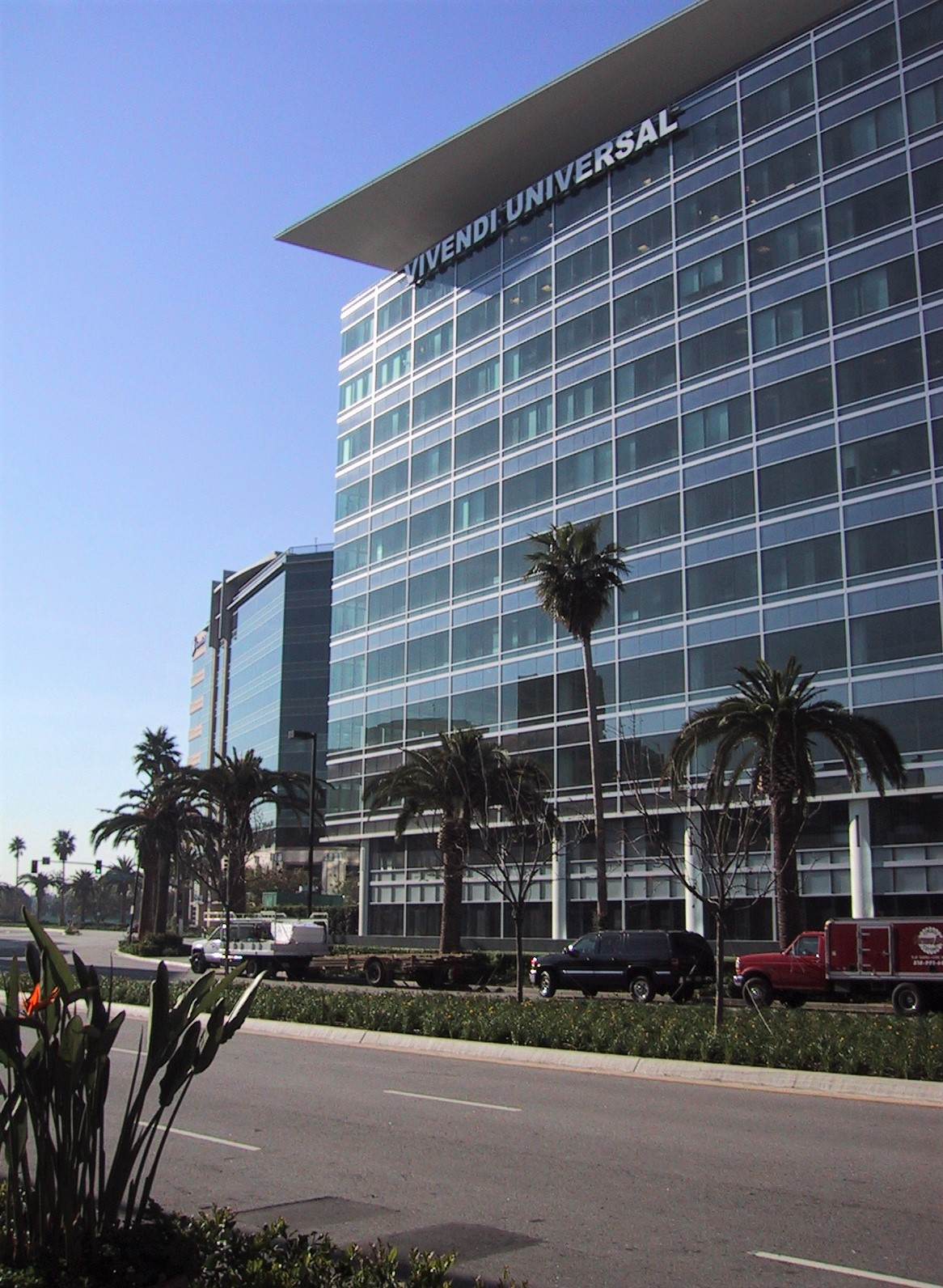
Headquarters of Vivendi Universal Games, located at 6060 Center Dr., Los Angeles

In early 2004, cost-cutting measures were taken at Sierra's parent company Vivendi Universal Games due to financial troubles and because of Sierra's lack of profitability as a working developer. Sierra's last owned studios Impressions Games and the Papyrus Design Group were both shut down in early 2004, laying off 50 people; 180 Sierra-related positions were eliminated at Vivendi's Los Angeles offices; and by June 2004, Vivendi had completely shut down Sierra's Bellevue location, laid off more than 100 employees, dispersed Sierra's work to other VU Games divisions, and re-located the remains of Sierra's assets to Vivendi's corporate headquarters in Fresno, California. In total, 350 people were laid off. Some assets were retired in the process, including Print Artist, and some like the Hoyle franchise were sold to other publishers or developers. Sierra was simply a publishing label and brand name for Vivendi assets, being used in tandem with its own name for publishing. As a company, Sierra was disestablished on August 24, 2004. The business continued to operate as a division of Vivendi Games.

In late 2005, the Sierra brand was re-launched from Los Angeles. A new subsidiary called Sierra Online (no-relation to Sierra's former name Sierra On-Line) was also founded within this time, which focused on downloadable and online-only games.

Throughout 2005 and 2006, Vivendi acquired several game development studios including Massive Entertainment, High Moon Studios, Radical Entertainment, Secret Lair Studios / Studio Ch'in (based in Seattle and Shanghai) and Swordfish Studios and integrated them into Sierra, alongside the creative licenses from other Vivendi divisions and from companies partnered with Vivendi and the copyrights of several notable intellectual properties, such as Crash Bandicoot, Spyro the Dragon, 50 Cent: Bulletproof and Scarface. Vivendi also ceased publishing under its own name by this point after its name change, with all major releases being under the Sierra brand name.

Caesar IV was published September 26, 2006, in North America, in partnership with Tilted Mill Entertainment.

In mid 2007, Sierra Online began launching Xbox Live Arcade games for the Xbox 360. One of the first releases is the conversion of the successful "German-style" board game Carcassonne, which had been in development at Secret Lair Studios.

In late 2007, Sierra released games like the first-person shooter game TimeShift (which was originally going to be published by Atari but was delayed various times during development) and the real-time tactical video game World in Conflict.

=== Closure and sale of properties (2008–2009) ===
In 2008, Sierra Entertainment's parent company Vivendi Games merged with video game publisher Activision to form Activision Blizzard. Vivendi Games was absorbed into Activision after the merger and the ownership of Sierra properties went to Activision. Later that year, Sierra was closed down for possible future sale. Leading up to the merger, Activision's management was confident that Sierra would cease operations post-merger.

On July 29, 2008, Activision announced a long-term strategy for its library of Sierra games and that they would only publish five titles: Crash: Mind Over Mutant, The Legend of Spyro: Dawn of the Dragon, Prototype, and Ice Age: Dawn of the Dinosaurs, and an unannounced new property. The rest of the titles planned for release, as well as the Sierra Online division, were deemed by the company to be "non-strategic" with its then-current business practices. A selection of earlier sales and reversions followed:

- July 30, 2008 – The video game rights to the Robert Ludlum/Bourne franchise reverted to Robert Ludlum's estate through its Ludlum Entertainment subsidiary. Ludlum subsequently licensed these rights to Electronic Arts in February 2009.
- August 6, 2008 – Activision announced that they had put Massive Entertainment up for sale, citing its disinterest in owning a European strategy developer, and that it was likely to sell World in Conflict and its dropped expansion pack Soviet Assault separately. Swordfish Studios was also put up for sale.
- August 13, 2008 – The video game licensing rights to Scarface, including a planned sequel to Scarface: The World is Yours, reverted to Universal Pictures.
- September 8, 2008 – Warner Bros. Interactive Entertainment announced that they had acquired the F.E.A.R. trademark from Activision, as well as the original title, consisting of the base game and its outsourced expansion packs Extraction Point and Perseus Mandate. The purchase of the trademark allowed Monolith Productions, who developed the original game, to rename its upcoming sequel Project Origin as F.E.A.R. 2: Project Origin.
- October 8, 2008 – Activision announced the closure of the online servers of several older Sierra games on November 1. This included the remaining World Opponent Network (WON) servers, ending the service that had provided multiplayer infrastructure for Sierra-published games since 1997. The Sierra Online division was also closed within that period despite the fact that two more games would be published under that name in 2009.
- October 13, 2008 – THQ picked up the rights to 50 Cent: Blood on the Sand.
- October 30, 2008 – Infogrames, the parent company of Atari, purchased publishing rights to Ghostbusters: The Video Game and The Chronicles of Riddick: Assault on Dark Athena, and secured licensing rights from Sony and Universal respectively for future titles using both licenses.
- November 11, 2008 – Ubisoft purchased Massive Entertainment, in addition to purchasing the rights to World in Conflict .
- November 12, 2008 – Monumental Games purchased Swordfish Studios' Manchester development studio.
- November 15, 2008 – Codemasters purchased Swordfish Studios' remaining studio in Birmingham.
- December 12, 2008 – Electronic Arts purchased the publishing rights to Brütal Legend.
- February 2009 – Codemasters purchased the Leisure Suit Larry IP and the publishing rights to Leisure Suit Larry: Box Office Bust.
- April 27, 2009 – Bethesda Softworks purchased the publishing rights to WET.
- July 14, 2009 – Rebellion Developments acquired several Sierra titles – Evil Genius, Ground Control, Empire Earth, Lords of Magic and Lords of the Realm.
- October 1, 2009 – Jeff Tunnell acquired The Incredible Machine through his company PushButton Labs.

=== Brand name revival under Activision (2014–2016) ===
The Sierra logo was used by Activision as a publishing label and brand name.

On August 7, 2014, the website for Sierra, which previously redirected to Activision's website, was updated to showcase a new logo, teasing: "More to be revealed at Gamescom 2014." Activision confirmed that the Sierra label would re-release some of its older games, re-imagine its older franchises, and collaborate with indie studios to create new "innovative, edgy and graphically unique" projects. Sierra plans to focus on publishing downloadable games through PlayStation Network, Steam, and Xbox Live. Ken Williams said, "We're very proud of what we created all those years ago with Sierra On-Line, and today's news about carrying Sierra forward as an indie-specific brand is very encouraging. We look forward to seeing Sierra's independent spirit live on." That day, King's Quest and Geometry Wars 3: Dimensions were announced as the first two games published under the revived Sierra brand. On December 5, 2014, the company was awarded with the "Industry Icon" award during the 2014 The Game Awards, and it introduced the first footage of the reboot of King's Quest.

In August 2018, TJX Companies acquired the sierra.com domain from Activision, and the former subsequently shortened the name of its Sierra Trading Post subsidiary to Sierra.

== Subsidiaries ==
=== Development ===
- Books That Work was acquired in April 1997, folded into Sierra in February 1999.
- Bright Star Technology in Bellevue, Washington was founded in 1980 and acquired in 1992.
- Berkeley Systems was purchased by CUC International in April 1997 and integrated into Sierra as an internal studio.
- Coktel Vision in Paris was founded in 1984 and acquired in October 1993.
- Arion Software was acquired in 1995 and absorbed into Sierra On-Line.
- The Pixellite Group was founded in 1983, acquired in May 1995, and absorbed into Sierra On-Line.
- Sublogic, based in Champaign, Illinois, was acquired in 1995 and absorbed into Sierra On-Line.
- Dynamix in Eugene, Oregon was founded in 1984, acquired in August 1990, and shut down in August 2001.
- Green Thumb Software in Boulder, Colorado was acquired and absorbed in July 1995.
- Headgate Studios in Bountiful, Utah was founded in 1992, acquired in April 1996, and sold to the original owner in 1999.
- Impressions Games in Cambridge, Massachusetts was founded in 1989, acquired in 1995, and closed in May 2004.
- Synergistic Software was founded in 1978, acquired in 1996, and folded into Sierra in February 1999.
- Papyrus Design Group in Watertown, Massachusetts was founded in 1987, acquired in 1995, and closed in May 2004.
- PyroTechnix was founded as Computer Presentation, acquired December 1997, and folded into Sierra in February 1999.
- Yosemite Entertainment in Oakhurst, California was formed in 1998, and folded into Sierra in February 1999.

=== Publishing ===
- Sierra Attractions; 1998–2001
- Sierra FX; 1998
- Sierra Home; 1996–2004
- Sierra Sports; February 1998–2000
- Sierra Studios; 1998–2001

== Games ==
Sierra both developed its own games and published several games from its divisions and from third-party developers. As a developer, Sierra launched the video game series King's Quest, Space Quest, Police Quest, Gabriel Knight, Leisure Suit Larry, and Quest for Glory.
