= Victoria Hemingson =

American actress and writer (born 1963)

- Born: Victoria Morsell; 11 September 1963 (age 62); Madison, Wisconsin, U.S.
- Education: Antioch University Los Angeles (MFA)
- Occupations: Actress; author
- Years active: 1988–present
- Spouse: David Hemingson (m. 1998)
- Children: 2

Victoria Hemingson (née Morsell; born September 11, 1963) is an American actress and author. She is best known for her starring role as Adrienne Delaney in the 1995 horror video game Phantasmagoria and for her appearances on various 1990s television series, including The Fresh Prince of Bel-Air and The Outer Limits. In her second career as a writer, she has received critical acclaim, including a Grand Prize from Book Pipeline Contest in 2021.

== Early life and education ==
Morsell was born in Madison, Wisconsin and attended Ventura High School in California. After a decade-long career in Hollywood, she transitioned to academia and creative writing, eventually earning a Master of Fine Arts (MFA) in Creative Writing from Antioch University Los Angeles.

== Career ==
Morsell's acting career was defined by her ability to play both dramatic and comedic roles on television and films. Morsell began her acting career in the late 1980s, appearing in the horror-comedy Saturday the 14th Strikes Back (1988). Throughout the 1990s, she became a frequent star on major television networks.

In 1995, Morsell gained international recognition among the gaming community for her lead role in Sierra On-Line's Phantasmagoria. Written by Roberta Williams, the game was a pioneer in the "Full Motion Video" (FMV) genre, requiring Morsell to film extensively in front of blue screens. Her portrayal of Adrienne Delaney, a novelist trapped in a haunted mansion, remains a cult favorite in the survival horror genre.

As the lead character Adrienne Delaney, she spent months filming in front of blue screens for what was then one of the most expensive and ambitious video games ever made. Morsell has noted that while she enjoyed the craft of acting, she became disillusioned with the "business" of Hollywood, specifically the long waits for brief auditions. She chose to leave the industry shortly after her final television roles in 1997 to focus on her family and education.

Morsell transitioned to professional writing under the name Victoria Hemingson. Her writing process is heavily influenced by her acting background, focusing on deep character exploration and psychological tension. She wrote Awful Necessary Things her primary literary work, this novel won the Grand Prize in the Mystery/Thriller category of the 2021 Book Pipeline Unpublished Contest.

She wrote essays and short fiction, such as the personal nonfiction piece Lifesavers, have been published in Hippocampus Magazine, Shondaland, and Santa Monica Review.

== Personal life ==
Morsell started dating David Homb, her co-star of Phantasmagoria in the late 1990s; they broke up on mutual terms and remained close friends. Morsell married to screenwriter David Hemingson on September 19, 1998. They live in Los Angeles and have two children.

In her personal writing, she has been open about her past struggles, including an eating disorder she faced during her early years as a receptionist and actress. She is an active member of the retro-gaming community and frequently collaborates with fellow Phantasmagoria cast members for charity streams and fan events.

== Filmography ==
=== Television ===
| Year | Title | Role | Notes |
|---|---|---|---|
| 1990 | Deceptions | Sandwich Girl | TV movie |
| 1992 | The Fresh Prince of Bel-Air | Lydia Marshall | Episode: "A Night at the Oprah" |
| 1992–1993 | Martin | Secretary; Woman in Crowd | 3 episodes |
| 1993 | Down the Shore | Girl | Episode: "Life's a Drag" |
| 1993 | At Home with the Webbers | Stripper | TV movie |
| 1995 | The Wayans Bros. | Stewardess | Episode: "First Class" |
| 1995 | Computer Chronicles | Victoria Morsell; Adrienne Delaney | Episode: "Greatest Computer Games" |
| 1995 | Night Stand with Dick Dietrick | Jamie LeFarr | Episode: "Frivolous Lawsuits" |
| 1996 | Renegade | Angela Baskin/Mary Polisokowski | Episode: "Hound Downtown" |
| 1996 | The Outer Limits | Candace | Episode: "Falling Star" |
| 1996 | Hot Line | Rachel Davis | Episode: "Sleepless Nights" |
| 1997 | Dangerous Minds | Judy Sloan | Episode: "Everybody Wants It" |
| 1997 | The New Adventures of Robin Hood | Gillian | Episode: "Percy's Ghost" |

=== Web series ===
| Year | Title | Role | Notes |
|---|---|---|---|
| 2023 | Game Grumps | Victoria | Episode: "Phantasmagoria 2 with the actors from the games!!!" |

=== Film ===
| Year | Title | Role | Notes |
|---|---|---|---|
| 1988 | Saturday the 14th Strikes Back | The Vampirettes | Debut |
| 1989 | Wizards of the Lost Kingdom II | Maiden | |
| 1995 | The Random Factor | Jen Anders | |
| 1996 | Savage | Julie Verne | |

=== Video games ===
| Year | Title | Role | Notes |
|---|---|---|---|
| 1995 | Phantasmagoria | Adrienne Delaney | PC |

== Awards and nominations ==
Name of the award ceremony, year presented, category, nominee of the award, and the result of the nomination
| Award ceremony | Year | Category | Nominee / Work | Result | Ref. |
|---|---|---|---|---|---|
| Book Pipeline Unpublished Contest | 2021 | Grand Prize in the Mystery/Thriller | Awful Necessary Things | Won | |
