= Phantasmagoria (video game) =

1995 video game

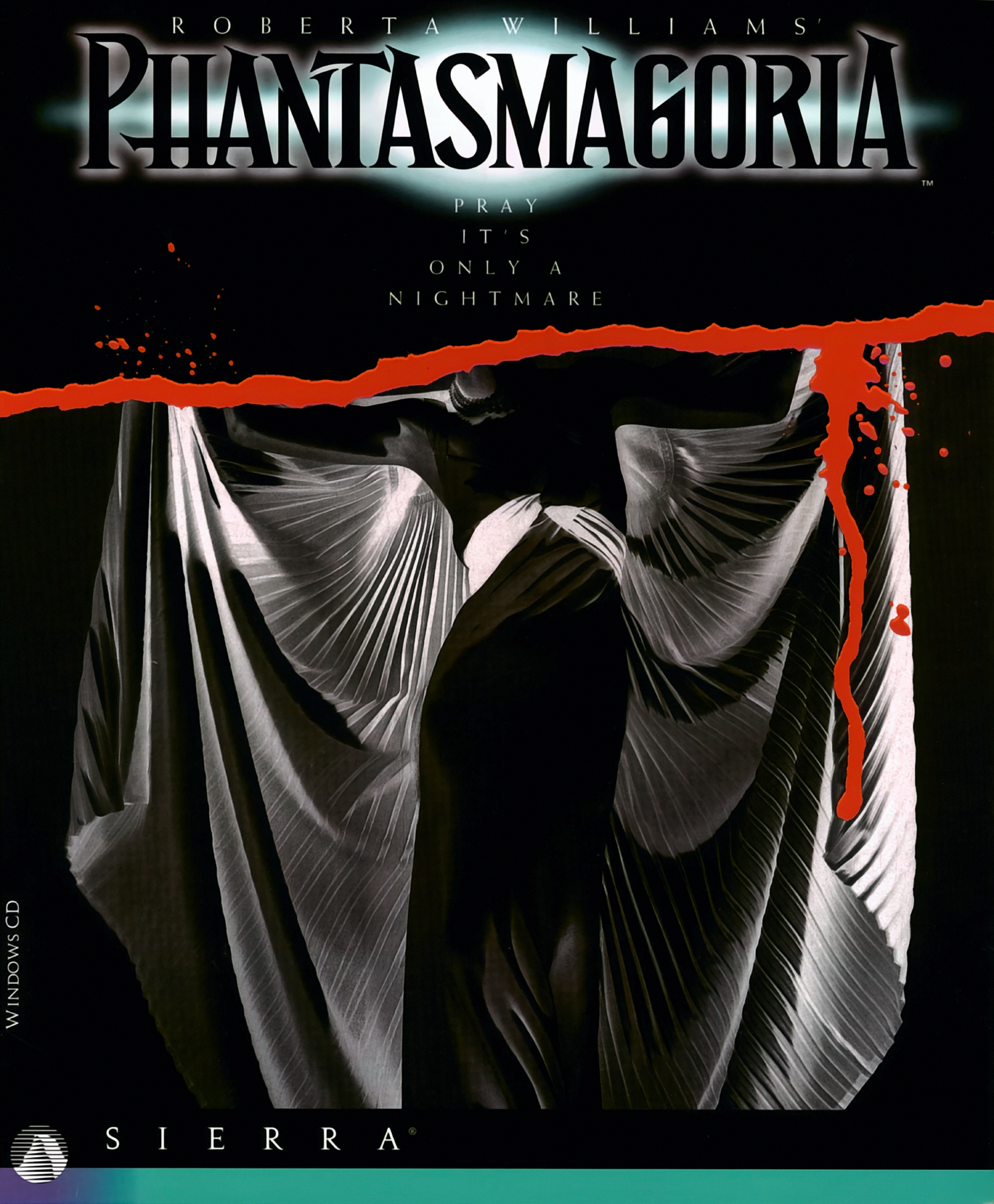
- Developer: Sierra On-Line (Note: Ported to Sega Saturn by Infini Entertainment Technology)
- Publishers: Sierra On-Line; Outrigger (Saturn)
- Director: Peter Maris
- Producers: Mark Seibert; J. Mark Hood; Roberta Williams
- Designer: Roberta Williams
- Programmer: Doug Oldfield
- Artist: Andy Hoyos
- Writers: Roberta Williams; Andy Hoyos
- Composers: Jay Usher; Mark Seibert
- Platforms: Microsoft Windows; MS-DOS; Sega Saturn
- Release: August 24, 1995: MS-DOS, Microsoft Windows; NA: August 24, 1995 Sega Saturn; JP: August 8, 1997
- Genres: Interactive film graphic adventure game
- Mode: Single-player

Phantasmagoria is a point-and-click adventure horror video game designed by Roberta Williams for MS-DOS and Microsoft Windows and released by Sierra On-Line on August 24, 1995. It tells the story of Adrienne Delaney (Victoria Morsell), a writer who moves into a remote mansion and finds herself terrorized by supernatural forces. It was made at the peak of popularity for interactive movie games and features live-action actors and footage, both during cinematic scenes and within the three-dimensionally rendered environments of the game itself. It was noted for its violence and sexual content.

Williams had long planned to design a horror game, but she waited eight years for software technology to improve before doing so. More than 200 people were involved in making Phantasmagoria, which was based on Williams's 550-page script, about four times the length of an average Hollywood screenplay. It took more than two years to develop and four months to film. The game was originally budgeted for $800,000, but it ultimately cost $4.5 million to develop and was filmed in a $1.5 million studio that Sierra built specifically for the game.

The game was directed by Peter Maris and features a cast of twenty-five actors, all performing in front of a blue screen. Most games at the time featured 80 to 100 backgrounds, while Phantasmagoria includes more than 1,000. A professional Hollywood special effects house worked on the game, and the musical score includes a neo-Gregorian chant performed by a 135-voice choir. Sierra stressed that it was intended for adult audiences, and the company willingly submitted it to a ratings system and included a password-protected censoring option within the game to tone down the graphic content.

Phantasmagoria was released on seven discs after multiple delays, but it was a financial success, grossing $12 million in its opening weekend and becoming one of the bestselling games of 1995. Sierra strongly promoted the game. It received mixed reviews, earning praise for its graphics and suspenseful tone while being criticized for its slow pacing and easy puzzles. The game also drew controversy, particularly due to a rape scene. CompUSA and other retailers declined to carry it, religious organizations and politicians condemned it, and it was refused classification altogether in Australia. The sequel Phantasmagoria: A Puzzle of Flesh was released in 1996, although Williams was not involved.

== Gameplay ==
Phantasmagoria includes a user interface with a screen that shows gameplay and cinematic scenes, surrounded by a stone border with buttons and inventory slots. The game integrates live-action performers within the three-dimensional rendered environments of the game.

Phantasmagoria is a point-and-click adventure game that features live-action actors and cinematic footage, both during scenes between the gameplay and within the three-dimensionally rendered environments of the game itself. The game was made when interactive movie games were at the peak of their popularity, with the release of such popular computer games as Wing Commander III and Under a Killing Moon. In this single-player game, the player controls protagonist Adrienne Delaney, who is always on the screen. The player can click certain areas of the screen to control her movements or make her explore specific places and objects. The camera angles and rooms change depending on where the player moves Adrienne. The game includes only four mouse commands: look (which changes to "talk to" when selecting a person), pick up item, use item, and walk. The mouse cursor is always an arrow, unlike in most earlier Sierra On-Line games, in which the cursor could be changed to represent different functions (like walk, hand, and eye) by right-clicking. The cursor turns red when it passes over an area where the user can click to perform an action. Once the action has been completed, the cursor will not turn red again. Objects in the game can be picked up by clicking on them or interacting with them in a film sequence, after which the item automatically goes into the inventory. If an object is small enough that it can be easily missed, a pulsing glow occasionally surrounds it to draw attention to it.

The user interface is a screen surrounded by a stone border, with buttons and eight inventory slots along the bottom. Adrienne can only hold eight items at once, and each black slot can contain an image of an item that the user can click on to retrieve or use within the game. In the middle of the inventory slots is a "P" button that brings up an options screen, allowing the player to save or restore games, change the game screen to full- or half-size, control the volume, or switch between a censored version of the game and uncensored one, with more graphic content. A chapter gauge on this screen conveys how much progress remains in a given chapter. A fast-forward button, located above the options button, allows the user to skip past cinematic scenes. On the left side of the interface is a red skull button, which the user can click to receive hints. On the right side is a red button with a picture of a closed eye, which displays any inventory item that the user drags to the button. The display shows a close-up image that can be turned in multiple directions.

Game designer Roberta Williams, co-founder of Sierra On-Line, deliberately made the Phantasmagoria gameplay and interface simple, unobtrusive, and intuitive so it would be more accessible and less frustrating for casual gamers. According to Arinn Dembo from Computer Gaming World, the game is focused more around the story and the frightening atmosphere, rather than on a difficult gaming experience, and therefore the puzzles are relatively easy, logical, and straightforward.

== Plot ==
Successful mystery novelist Adrienne Delaney (Victoria Morsell) and her photographer husband Don Gordon (David Homb) along with her pet cat Spaz have just purchased a remote mansion off the coast of a small New England island previously owned by a famous 19th-century magician, Zoltan "Carno" Carnovasch (Robert Miano), whose five wives all died mysteriously. Adrienne hopes to find an inspiration for her next novel in her new home, but starts having nightmares immediately upon moving in. She is comforted by the loving and supportive Don. Adrienne explores the estate, making mysterious discoveries like strange music, warnings written on her computer, and ominous messages from a fortune-teller automaton. Unbeknownst to the happy couple, Carno had practiced black magic when he lived in the mansion and had summoned an evil demon that possessed him and caused him to murder his wives.

During her exploration of the grounds, Adrienne finds a secret chapel hidden behind a bricked off fireplace. After opening a locked box atop an altar, Adrienne unknowingly releases the demon that possessed Carno, which then possesses Don. Don starts acting menacingly towards Adrienne and drinking heavily, culminating in him assaulting her later on. Adrienne meets Harriet Hockaday (V. Joy Lee), a superstitious vagrant, and her strong but dim-witted son, Cyrus (Steven W. Bailey), who are secretly living in a barn on the estate. After Adrienne agrees to let them stay, they volunteer to help around the mansion, though Don disapproves. When a technician named Mike (Carl Neimic) visits the mansion to install the phone-line, Don screams at him in a jealous rage, warning him to stay away from his wife. Spaz also goes missing with Adrienne later discovering Spaz's collar where Don had been sitting by the fireplace earlier.

While the local townspeople believe all Carno's wives died of natural causes or accidentally, Adrienne learns through a series of visions that he murdered them in grotesque ways. Hortencia (Christine Armond), who avoided Zoltan's abuse by secluding herself in her greenhouse, (especially after the death of their daughter, Sofia, who drowned in the castle pond, suspecting Carno himself to have been responsible), was stabbed with gardening tools and then suffocated with mulch. Victoria (Holley Chant), an alcoholic, was killed when Zoltan impales her eye with a wine bottle during an argument. An overly talkative third wife, Leonora (Dana Moody), has her mouth gagged and then her neck contorted in a torture device. Finally, the food-loving Regina (Wanda Smith) was force-fed animal entrails through a funnel until she choked to death.

Harriet performs a séance for Adrienne, in which she vomits a green ectoplasm that takes the form of Carno. A repentant Carno tells her that he was possessed by the demon when he tried to learn black magic to use in his performances. He reveals that the previously trapped demon must be stopped and only she can contain it once again. Adrienne is later horrified to discover Spaz's dead body in the garden.

Adrienne visits the nearly 110-year-old Malcolm Wyrmshadow (Douglas Seale), who is being cared for by Ethel (Lilyan Chauvin); Malcolm had been Carno's apprentice as a young boy and reveals that Carno met his demise after his last wife, Marie (Traci Clauson), who was tired of being abused by him, discovered he was a murderer. Marie conspired with her secret lover, Gaston (Jeff Rector), Carno's prop master, to kill Carno by sabotaging the equipment for his most dangerous escapology trick; "The Throne Of Terror", in which Carno donned a burning hood and escaped from bonds on a throne underneath a swinging axe. The sabotage left Carno horribly burned/disfigured and falling into a coma, assumed dead, but he astonishingly survived and then attacked Marie and Gaston, mutilating them both. After killing Marie by beheading her with the throne, Carno was then impaled by Gaston, before succumbing to his own wounds.

Malcolm that reveals that it was he who had originally sealed the demon in the estate's chapel and also tells Adrienne about a ritual that can eradicate the demon. Later that night, Mike leaves the mansion, finally having completed installing the phone-line, but is then murdered by Don with an axe. Harriet, fearing for her safety, decides to leave with Cyrus as Don becomes more abusive and erratic.

The next day Adrienne discovers she cannot leave the mansion and later finds a collection of photos of her in Don's darkroom which have her head cut off. She is confronted by Don, who is now completely insane and dressed like Carno. Adrienne scars Don's face with acid from his darkroom when he tries to kill her and flees, discovering the corpses of Mike, Harriet and Cyrus hidden throughout the mansion. Don captures Adrienne and straps her into the throne, but she distracts him long enough to free herself and trigger the swinging axe, which impales and kills Don. His death unleashes the demon, which pursues Adrienne throughout the mansion. She escapes long enough to perform the ritual to trap the demon once again. The game then ends with Adrienne walking out of the mansion with a vacant stare, almost catatonic.

== Development ==
=== Conception ===
Phantasmagoria was a radically different game for Williams, who was best known for designing the family-friendly King's Quest fantasy adventure game series. Williams said she did not want to get typecast in a particular genre, adding: "I felt I had more to offer than fairy stories. I wanted to explore games with a lot of substance and deep emotions." Although Phantasmagoria was her first horror game, Williams had created murder and crime stories in her earlier mystery games, Mystery House and the Laura Bow series. Williams was a fan of the horror genre, although she did not watch many horror films as a child after a traumatic experience watching Horrors of the Black Museum (1959) at a very young age. She began watching them again as a teen, and particularly enjoyed such films as Halloween (1978), and movies based on Stephen King novels, like Carrie and The Shining (1980). Williams cited the works of King and Edgar Allan Poe as the inspirations behind Phantasmagoria.

Williams had wanted to make a horror game for eight years prior to Phantasmagoria, and had started to design one on several occasions, but none came to fruition. She felt the computer game industry and software technology had not yet reached the point where an effective and frightening computer game could be made. As a result, she decided to wait until CD-ROMs were faster and could handle real actors, which she believed was crucial for a horror game because she felt the player had to be able to empathize with the character to fear for them. Williams had been considering several horror story ideas for years before making the game. In one, the heroine answers a magician's advertisement for an assistant and gets the job, but the magician turns out to be insane. Another was set in the past, with the female protagonist getting involved in the supernatural life of a magician character. That idea evolved into a woman being married to a man who is drawn to a bizarre house that previously belonged to illusionists and is haunted by ghosts. The final story as it appears in the game has a contemporary setting, but combines elements from modern fiction, 19th century literature, and classic horror films of the 1950s.

=== Writing ===
Phantasmagoria was the first Sierra On-Line game script to be written like a film screenplay. During the writing stage, Williams was under pressure to ensure Phantasmagoria was a commercial success for Sierra. She also faced concerns from her husband Ken Williams, the company president and co-founder of Sierra, who wanted the company to focus more on lower-cost, combat-oriented animated games, and was also concerned about the level of violence in Phantasmagoria. Williams said she knew the rape scene in particular would be controversial, but she felt it was essential to the plot because it was a turning point that made Adrienne realize something was deeply wrong with Don. She felt the rest of the story "would make no sense" without the scene, but also knew there was a chance it would be cut from the game before production ended.

The script numbered roughly 550 pages when completed, about four times the size of an average Hollywood screenplay. It also included another 100 pages of storyboards representing a total of 800 scenes. In preparation for writing it, Williams spent six months watching horror films and reading horror novels, as well as reading books about how to write horror novels and screenplays. She also asked people she knew socially to tell her scary stories so she could identify the elements of fear. She immersed herself so deeply into the genre that she began having nightmares and had to scale back her reading. She also spent about six months researching historical aspects of the story before the writing process. Williams had a history of using female protagonists in her games, like the Laura Bow series and some of the King's Quest games. She said her own personality was a partial inspiration for the protagonist Adrienne, although it was not purposeful: "I think it just kind of naturally worked out that way."

Andy Hoyos, the game's art director and a horror aficionado, participated in brainstorming sessions and discussions with Williams during the writing stage. He conceived the ideas for most of the death scenes and tried to make each one different and original with what he called "fresh approaches to murder." Williams wanted to include more scenes with Adrienne and Don as a happy, normal couple, so that Don's transformation to evil would have greater impact. She proved unable to do so while also maintaining the correct pacing for the gameplay. Williams wrote Phantasmagoria with the mass market in mind, targeting casual players as well as die-hard computer game fans. To that end, she wrote the game in short chapters to break it into smaller, easier-to-play sections. Her targeted demographic for the game was ages 16 and older. She chose the title "Phantasmagoria" after reading the word in a reference book about the history of magic and magicians. The term refers to a 17th-century theatrical horror show in which "spirits of the dead" were revealed in a darkened theater by the use of a modified magic lantern.

=== Design ===
Andy Hoyos was the art director for Phantasmagoria, and Kim White, Brandee Prugh and Brian Judy were among the computer artists. It was the first computer game Prugh worked on. Mark Hood, a veteran Sierra programmer, and Mark Seibert served as Phantasmagoria project managers. Seibert called managing the project "much more of a technical and managerial problem-solving job than I ever envisioned." Unlike previous Sierra games, it also involved managing a great deal of outside resources, such as keeping the studio and outside art contractors on schedule. The game's three-dimensional graphics were among the first rendered on Silicon Graphics software. In creating the look of the game, Hoyos drew particular inspiration from the films of Tim Burton, and he particularly tried to emulate the lighting, sets and "imaginative edge" of Batman (1989). Other influences included the films Alien (1979) and Hellraiser (1987). Phantasmagoria was designed using the 3-D software package Alias. Hoyos started by designing the rooms, then created the furniture, and added textures and lighting. Once complete, the computer rendered final images of each room, which became the backgrounds for the game. While most computer games at the time had between 80 and 100 background pictures, Phantasmagoria had more than 1,000.

The game developers realized early during development that the game could not be completed entirely in-house due to the large scope of the project, and required working with Hollywood agencies, actors and special effects houses, among others. This added further complexity to the game's development and design. Gerald B. Wolfe, the game's director of photography, spoke to the artists about how to set up the camera angles during filming to best accommodate the design of the rooms. Mannequins created in the computer substituted as stand-ins for the actors to help Wolfe position the shots. Most of the artists had never created computer-generated backgrounds for video-captured characters, and found it to be a challenging process. Seibert said bridging the gap between Hollywood and the software world was difficult at first, but after about four weeks of shooting, the two sides had "come to a common language and had a greater understanding of the process." Hoyos said the biggest difficulty in designing the look of the game was creating a definitive scale for the environment, and ensuring the objects and environment would eventually be compatible with human characters and maintain realism.

Once the filming was completed, more than 20 two-hour Beta SP video tapes of footage had to be edited down to fit the actions of the game. The programming included editing the original video footage, and mixing the rendered images of doors, drawers, chairs and other objects into the footage frame-by-frame, which was necessary for more than 100 scenes. The game required more polishing and fine-tuning than most games of its time due to the many video components, and the programmers had to determine the desired frame rate, data transfer rate and desired resolution of the video elements. Another challenge for the game was CD resource management. Since many of the scenes in the game could be repeated in multiple chapters, some pieces of the code were written onto several different CDs to reduce the number of times the player had to swap discs in the middle of a chapter, an unusual practice for computer games at the time. The final game was on seven discs, a large number for a computer game, and more than the four or five discs originally expected.

=== Casting ===
Twenty-five professional actors were cast in Phantasmagoria. Roberta Williams watched the audition tapes of all the roles, and was involved with Mark Seibert in picking the actors. The only actor that Seibert chose without Williams' input was Victoria Morsell as the protagonist, Adrienne Delaney. Williams had watched other audition tapes for the part and was not happy with any of the choices. While she was on vacation, Seibert watched Morsell's audition and immediately selected her for the part. Williams was initially concerned that she was not involved in the decision, but later came to agree that Morsell was the correct choice. Morsell mostly had television experience, but had also previously worked in film and theater roles. She had to work 10 to 12 hours a day, six days a week, for three months to capture all her character's actions and movements. David Homb portrayed Adrienne's husband, Don Gordon. Morsell and Homb started dating in real life after filming. Robert Miano was cast as the villain Zoltan "Carno" Carnovasch. He had previously appeared in several films by Phantasmagoria director Peter Maris.

The comic relief roles of Harriet and Cyrus were played by V. Joy Lee and Steven W. Bailey, respectively. Lee had mostly done theater work in the Atlanta and Seattle areas, along with appearing in some industrial films and an episode of Northern Exposure. Bailey had been an actor in Seattle for about three years, doing mostly stage work, as well as some commercials, television episodes, independent films, and industrial films for the United States Navy. Malcolm was portrayed by veteran actor Douglas Seale. Stella Stevens played the antiques store owner Lou Ann, Geoff Pryser played Bob the realtor, and Carl Neimic played phone technician Mike. Traci Clauson portrayed Marie, Carno's fifth and final wife.

=== Filming ===
Phantasmagoria was Sierra's first game to use live actors integrated with computer-generated backgrounds. About 600 scenes were filmed for the game. The total filming took about four months, 12 hours a day, shooting six days a week. More than 200 people were ultimately involved in the making of the game. A total of $800,000 was originally budgeted for Phantasmagoria, but it ended up costing $4.5 million. The budget issues caused some friction between Roberta and Ken Williams. It was the first game made in a new filming studio built by Sierra in Oakhurst, California, the same location as Sierra's headquarters. It cost $1.5 million to build and was overseen by studio manager Bill Crow, who said, "Phantasmagoria essentially started with the design and creation of the studio." Sierra also developed computerized tools specifically to manage the shooting process, including software to digitize the video into the computer. Some of the software was built as the game was being made and as the need for new tools was being identified.

Sierra wanted the game to have Hollywood-quality film sequences, so they sought a director with experience in the film industry. They hired Peter Maris, whose previous experience was mainly of action and drama films, although some of his earlier films were graphic horror movies. Maris and Roberta Williams collaborated a great deal from the beginning of the process, with Maris explaining what he wanted in each scene from a filmmaker's perspective, and Williams explaining her desires from a game designer's perspective. Maris set up the camera angles and worked with the actors, using three motion-controlled cameras during the shooting. All filming was done entirely in front of a blue screen, and the digitized information was later loaded into the Silicon Graphics computers, which synchronized the relative motion of computer-generated, three-dimensional background art. Next, the live action and the backgrounds were composited using advanced techniques controlled by Petro Vlahos's UltiMatte system. The computer imaging components made Phantasmagoria a very different experience for Maris than his usual film industry work. Crow served as a production coordinator during filming, helping facilitate what happened on stage. He also directed the scenes that involved stunts or other special effects that required the coordination of animated sequences with live action. Cindy Jordan worked as the makeup artist.

Due to the nature of filming for a computer game, certain short performances had to be filmed over and over separately, like Adrienne simply crossing a room. Many of the actors, including Morsell, Lee and Bailey, had never done any blue screen acting before, and Miano had only done it once. Morsell in particular said she found it challenging because it was so physically constrictive. Such items as tables, chairs, doors or stairs that the actors appear to interact with are in fact constructed objects painted blue to match the blue screen, and were occasionally challenging for the actors to work with. During one scene, David Homb accidentally stood in such a way that his arm appeared to be going through the living room wall.

Morsell found it challenging to film a scene near the end of the game, in which Adrienne is pleading with Don while getting strapped into the chair with a guillotine overhead. Several different versions of the scene had to be filmed, and Morsell said it was difficult for her to work up the genuine emotion she needed take after take. The torture devices featured in the game were scale models made by local craftsmen. During one scene, the mansion roof starts to collapse, causing beams and chunks of debris to fall around the actors. To achieve this, the crew built lightweight beams out of hollow cardboard, which had to fall in the correct sequence. In another scene, Adrienne crawls along a water pipe that breaks. To film the scene without damaging equipment, the crew built a giant plastic box with a plastic tray underneath for the shoot. Three hoses ran through the pipe so water would spray in multiple directions.

The chase scene at the end of the game, in which Don pursues Adrienne throughout the entire mansion, took a full week to film. Homb wore a prosthesis on his face to simulate wounds from Adrienne pouring acid on him. Only one prosthesis was available, and it was in such bad shape by the end of filming that Williams said "we were essentially holding it in place with the proverbial wire and bailing wax." Several scenes in Phantasmagoria involved animals, including a Doberman Pinscher, two cats, a beagle and several rats. Sierra commissioned Dave Macmillan and other Hollywood animal handlers from the company Worldwide Movie Animals to handle the animals. Two cats were required to portray Adrienne's pet Spaz because the cats were temperamental and each would have moments when they would not perform. Some objects were borrowed by a museum operated by the Fresno Flats Historical Society and used as props in the game. The society was thanked in the credits as a result. Ultimately, all of the scenes filmed for Phantasmagoria were used in the final game. Some were edited for length and pacing, but none were cut altogether.

Despite a storyline running over a course of seven days, Adrienne wears the same wardrobe throughout the entire game: an orange shirt and black pants. Williams said this is because many of Adrienne's actions throughout the game can be repeated by the player over and over, making it difficult to change her wardrobe without it becoming "a nightmare of shooting." The only solutions she saw were to allow less decision-making by the player, or to keep the flexibility intact but not allow any costume changes. Williams said she decided the latter option was ultimately better for the game. An orange shirt was chosen for the character because it was the best color to shoot against the blue screen. None of the characters wear blue, purple, gray or any shade of green similar to the blue screen for that same reason.

=== Effects ===
In one of several special effects created by The Character Shop, a model cast of actress Victoria Morsell's head was pulled apart by strings to create the appearance that a demon was ripping the head apart.

For Phantasmagoria's special effects, Sierra sought the professional effects house The Character Shop, headed by senior creature maker Rick Lazzarini. The core special effects team for the game consisted of Lazzarini, Michael Esbin and Bill Zahn. Lazzarini said making Phantasmagoria was a much faster and more cooperative process than in the film industry. Due to the tight filming schedule, most effects had to be done in one shot with no cuts, so there was less margin for error. They created the effects for all the death scenes in the game, which included creating assorted body prostheses, burn makeup and what Lazzarini called "gallons of fake blood," which was made of sugar, water and dye.

Adrienne's head is split open by a swinging pendulum blade in one death scene, an effect that took several hours to set up. A fake head was created from a model cast of Morsell's head, with pumps installed to pump fake blood into it, and strings attached to either side so it could be pulled apart. The crew only had one head model, so they had to keep putting it back together and reusing it over and over for each take. After filming was completed, the crew put the head back together and took a picture of Morsell with it.

One scene involved a burning head, which was created by taking a cast of the actor's face, head and body with a plaster, then placing soft rubber over the cast to simulate human flesh. It was also treated so it did not release black smoke like a rubber tire when it burned. For burn effects placed on the body after the fire, the crew made a sculpture of the wounds, then mounted them onto rubber appliances, which were glued to the actor. For Harriet's death scene, in which she is scalped and her brain is visible, makeup artist Cindy Jordan put a cap over actress V. Joy Lee's head and covered it with mortician's wax to make it look bumpy. Another special effect involved a spirit that appears in the form of ectoplasm during a séance. It was created from cellulose, water and green food coloring. It proved difficult to make, and several attempts were made before the right consistency was achieved. To create the appearance of it coming out of actress V. Joy Lee's mouth, an eight-foot long hose was attached to the side of her face. Project manager Mark Seibert had to suck the fake ectoplasm through the hose to get it in, then during filming he spit it out. It took several shots before the take was successful, and it looked so funny during filming that the crew kept laughing during takes.

=== Music ===
Sierra composers Mark Seibert and Jay User created the musical score for Phantasmagoria, with Neal Grandstaf providing additional music. Most of the music is a mixture of real instruments with synthesized and sampled sounds, and unlike previous Sierra games, the score was recorded live, rather than created in the computer. Themes for the music ranged from rock and roll to opera. The composers observed the game and various scenes to prepare their score, trying to create an ambiance and identify spots to build the tension with music, creating stingers as needed. For cinematic scenes, they watched tapes after the scenes were shot and composed the music afterward. This was a new process for Sierra and the computer game industry in general, but the same concept was regularly followed in the film industry.

The opening theme of the game features a neo-Gregorian chant, which was performed in studio by a 135-voice choir. Much of the underscore music that plays when the player is exploring the game, rather than during cinematic scenes, is based upon that opening scene. The composers made use of silence in many scenes, to build up tension for moments of a "pounce" effect, creating the effect with music that something is catching the listener. They deliberately saved the most intense music for the final chapter of Phantasmagoria, when the game becomes the most intense. During some chase scenes, drums and low strings are used in the score to simulate a heartbeat, which grows louder and louder during more dangerous moments.

== Release ==
Phantasmagoria took more than two years to develop. Sierra officials said this was because it was so different from anything that had been done previously, in both the Hollywood or computer game industries, and the new challenges led to complexities. Roberta Williams said: "It took a full year just to get people to understand what I wanted to do." The game experienced multiple delays before it was ultimately released. It was originally planned that the game would be in stores by late 1993 or early 1994, with Sierra saying it would come out no later than the fall of 1994. The game was previewed at the Consumer Electronics Show in Chicago in June 1994, where it was announced the release date had been pushed back to October 1994 and that the game would be made available on two discs. The game ultimately required seven discs. The shipping date was later changed again to Christmas 1994, and then February 1995, before Sierra said it would be delayed yet again as the company continued to refine the technology of live-action video. It was announced the game would be ready in June 1995, but when Sierra organized road shows that month to market 18 of its new games, Phantasmagoria was not among them because it was not ready yet.

The date was changed once more to August 3, before it was finally released in stores on August 24, 1995, the same day as the Microsoft's operating system Windows 95 version. Phantasmagoria came out first for Windows 95, Windows 3.1 and MS-DOS, then for Macintosh computers in November 1995. A hint book by Sierra came out at the same time as the game. Phantasmagoria was also ported to Sega Saturn and spanned eight discs exclusively in Japan, where it was fully translated and dubbed into Japanese, and released by Outrigger under the name Phantasm. In response to all the delays, Vince Broady, executive editor of the monthly publication Multimedia World, said Sierra may have been attempting to avoid the same mistakes from the previous year with Outpost, for which the company released many advertisements and reviews, but then over-promoted and released before it was finished. Sierra spokeswoman Kathy Gillmore admitted that mistakes were made in marketing Outpost and Sierra had tried to fix them. The minimum system requirements were an IBM compatible 486–25, 8 megabytes of RAM, 5 megabytes hard disk space, SVGA (256 colors) and a 2x CD-ROM. It supported Sound Blaster-compatible sound cards, and for MS-DOS the game worked with a megahertz chip. It sold for as much as $80 in some stores, but was typically sold for $69.95.

Phantasmagoria was heavily advertised by Sierra in advance of its release, and the company touted it as its biggest game to date. It was Sierra's first computer game targeted to an adult audience. There was no legislated rating system for computer games in the United States in place, although one was being debated before the U.S. Senate at the time. Sierra was among several major software companies that voluntarily supported the ratings system designed by the Entertainment Software Rating Board, which rated games so adults could make decisions about software purchases. The game was given an "M" rating for "mature" audiences, meaning intended for audiences 17 or older. As a result, it carried a content warning on the box that said "contains adult subject matter." The game box prominently displayed this rating, as well as a warning on the back panel that the game contains adult subject matter inappropriate for children. It also encouraged parents to review the material before providing it to children and asked retailers not to sell it to minors. Phantasmagoria also received mature ratings in Germany and the United Kingdom.

The game itself includes a filter that players can activate with a password so that violent or sexually explicit content is censored. When the filter is in place, the screen blurs during the most violent sections, so the player can hear the action but cannot see it. Sierra officials believed it was the first CD-ROM adventure game that self-censored upon command. Sierra producer Mark Seibert said: "There are some pretty gruesome things, and we're concerned about how that is going to impact parents who want to buy a good game with a good story line." But Gene Emery of The Providence Journal said the censoring option was "unlikely to stop any computer-literate 10-year-old" and by scrambling portions of the videos that might be considered offensive, "the censorship option actually makes the explicit scenes seem even worse than they really are."

In October 1997, the first chapter of Phantasmagoria was included in the Roberta Williams Anthology, a limited-edition collection of 15 games created by Williams over 18 years. Phantasmagoria was made available for digital download on the website GOG.com starting in February 2010 for $9.99.

== Reception ==
=== Sales ===
Phantasmagoria quickly became the bestselling game in the United States, and was Sierra's bestselling computer game to date. It grossed $12,000,000 and sold 300,000 units during its first week-end of release, debuting at number four in PC Data's August 1995 list of top-selling computer games for MS-DOS and Windows. It followed MechWarrior 2, Microsoft Flight Simulator and Myst. By September, it had reached number one on the list among computer games and ranked third among all computer software, following Windows 95 and Microsoft Plus! InterAction, a magazine published by Sierra On-Line, wrote that no other Sierra game topped game charts as quickly as Phantasmagoria did. By the end of December, it remained at number three among overall software, and number one among computer games, and by January it was estimated as many as 500,000 copies had been sold. According to Sierra On-Line, its global sales surpassed 600,000 units by March 1996.

Phantasmagoria finished 1995 as the ninth bestselling game of the year according to an analysis by PC Data of sales by 42 retail chains. In January 1996, Phantasmagoria was the fourth-best seller among MS-DOS and Windows games, behind Microsoft Flight Simulator, Myst and Command & Conquer, and it was number six among all computer software. By February 10 it was number five among MS-DOS and Windows games, and by February 24 it was number 10. It received a boost in June 1996, possibly due to the pending release of its sequel Phantasmagoria: A Puzzle of Flesh, and jumped back up to seventh among bestselling computer software programs according to Computer Life magazine. One year after Phantasmagoria was released, it still remained in the bestseller charts, and more than one million copies were ultimately sold, making it Sierra's first game to reach that milestone. NPD Techworld, which tracked sales in the United States, reported 301,138 units sold of Phantasmagoria by December 2002.

=== Reviews ===
Reception

Aggregate scores
Aggregator	Score
GameRankings	59.17%
Metacritic	62/100

Review scores
Publication	Score
Adventure Gamers	1.5/5
AllGame	4.5/5
Computer Gaming World	4/5
GameSpot	6.0/10
Next Generation	3/5
PC Gamer (US)	88%
PC Games	A−

Phantasmagoria received mixed reviews. Vince Broady, executive editor of Multimedia World, said Sierra was smart to try to capture the adult market, which was looking for sophisticated games especially after the popularity of games such as The 7th Guest. Dwight Silverman of the Houston Chronicle declared it the best game of the year, calling it a "masterwork" and "as close as it gets to a film you control," although he said not everyone would appreciate it due to its violent content. Entertainment Weekly gave it a B+ and called it "one of the surest signs yet of computer games approaching the quality level of the movies." The review said it had some suspenseful and novel twists, but also some "horrific touches (that) seem a bit derivative, such as a Freddy Krueger-like nightmare in which hands pull you through a bed." Kim McDaniel of The Salt Lake Tribune called it "the most sophisticated computer game to date" and "a weird, wild, horrific ride that will make you jump at every turn, even if you aren't normally faint-of-heart." Although McDaniel said it might be easy for experienced players, she appreciated that it was more accessible for casual players than difficult games like The 7th Guest.

A Billboard magazine review said Phantasmagoria "lives up to the advanced billing" and "aims to unnerve and succeeds gruesomely with bloody special effects interspliced in trusty scare-flick fashion with daubs of flesh and hints of sex." USA Today writer Joe Wilson gave it three-and-a-half stars and called it well-produced, visually appealing, frighteningly realistic and "a much-needed change from normal fare," although he said the plot did not start to become interesting until halfway through. Gene Emery of The Providence Journal said the game was "an impressive work, a sophisticated mix of live action and a rich computer-generated environment, coupled with a musical score that's spooky without being overwhelming." He also called the gameplay "elegant in its simplicity." San Francisco Chronicle writer Laura Evenson called it unpredictable and addictive, comparing it to a good mystery novel. A reviewer for Next Generation was pleased with the story, the production values of the cutscenes, and the way the game mixed in full motion video without resulting in slowdown or poor control. However, he found that the lack of a challenge made it a poor value for experienced players, since they would be able to finish the entire game in a day or two, and recommended it strictly for those who were new to the adventure genre. Ric Manning of the Gannett News Service wrote, "The graphics are terrific, but don't play on a full stomach." Steve La Rue of U-T San Diego found the game "visually opulent and interesting" with "dialogue a lot better than I expected, given the trite gothic novel plot," but also said he had to adjust to the "gradual, contemplative pace." Jack Warner of The Atlanta Journal-Constitution wrote: "It's hackneyed, but the art is so good, the acting sufficiently convincing and the atmosphere brooding enough to keep you going," although he said "precious little happens" in the first few discs.

Computer Gaming World writer Arinn Dembo called the storyline of a couple buying a haunted mansion "a cliché so familiar that it needs no explanation," but said it still worked in a computer game because the player could directly experience it in that medium, rather than simply watching it in a film. Dembo also praised the game for featuring a female protagonist, though she said Adrienne was too much of an exaggeratedly feminine "girlie-type girl." Overall, Dembo said the game "achieved a new height of realism and beauty in a computer game" and was "an important technological leap, and represents a step forward for the whole industry." Another Computer Gaming World review said Phantasamagoria "appears to deliver on its ambitious promises" and that although the puzzles are too simple for experienced gamers, the appeal of the game is exploring a setting that "would have had even the folks in Amityville making tracks." Harley Jebens of the Austin American-Statesman said some of the acting was "hilariously bad" and the storyline was predictable, but that the game keeps you engaged, the story draws you in and the controls were well executed. Fort Worth Star-Telegram writer Andy Greiser said the game was a beautiful combination of live actors and computer-built backgrounds, but said the action doesn't start to pick up until the halfway point. In a mixed review, Phil LaRose of The Advocate praised the game for having a female protagonist and excellent special effects, and said it had gone further toward merging the realms of film and game than any other computer game. He also said the game was too linear, with overly simple puzzles and a plotline with "so many recycled concepts in this game, players will feel like they've seen it all before."

Other reviews were more negative. GameSpot writer Jeff Sengstack said the expensive budget and long production history "do not necessarily translate into high quality gaming." He complimented the graphics and music, but considered "[the game] generally unchallenging, the characters weak, the violence over-the-top, and the script just lame." Mike Hall of the Albuquerque Journal compared Phantasmagoria to big-budget films with multimillion-dollar budgets and multiple production delays that ultimately failed, like Cleopatra and Waterworld. He said the graphics were beautiful, but the game ended too quickly, the plot was thin and the puzzles were too easy to solve. The Escapist writer Brendan Main said the game fell short of its ambition to change how gamers experienced horror media, and the juxtaposition of real-life actors on settings that were "ordinary, pixilated fare" was "odd and unflattering." A one-star review in The Video Games Guide, published in 2013, "now seems little more than a flawed, though ambitious, white elephant." In a 2014 review, IGN writer Kosta Andreadis said the game's special effects were still effective, and that Phantasmagoria wisely builds suspense and saves the violent content for the end of the game. But he said it was ultimately "less a bad game than a bad horror film" and said the execution, "although technically interesting, is extremely goofy, full of ludicrous situations, weird plot turns, bizarre dialogue, and dated costume choices."

In a review of Phantasmagoria in Black Gate, Sue Granquist said "The game's graphic violence (and I do mean 'graphic' – in some cases disturbingly so) and content also led to some controversy. Phantasmagoria was attacked by a number of people, refused to be carried by some retailers, and was outright banned altogether in Australia due to their censorship laws. Unsurprisingly, all of the red tape around the game just made horror fans crave it even more."

=== Awards ===
Phantasmagoria earned an Editor's Choice Award from PC Gamer, and a Golden Triad Award from Computer Game Review, whose editors later gave it their 1995 Best FMV of the Year prize. It was nominated for Best Adventure/Role-Playing Software in the annual Excellence in Software Awards competition, known in the game industry as "The Codies," which are among the most prestigious honors in software development. It was also named Best Adventure Game of the Year by Games Magazine, Game of the Month by Windows Magazine, and was one of three nominees for PC/Computing's Game of the Year.

=== Controversy ===
Before Phantasmagoria was released, CompUSA, the nation's largest discount computer retailer, notified Sierra it would not stock the game. The company did not comment on specific reasons for their decision except for a written statement from chief operating officer Hal Compton: "Software comes out all the time. Some we buy, some we don't. This one we chose not to." Analysts believed CompUSA objected to the realistic violence in the game. Lee S. Isgur of Jefferies & Co., a global investment bank that followed the computer game industry, said CompUSA's decision probably would not harm overall sales of the game, and that it could in fact help it generate publicity. He added that "It's probably one of the bloodiest games ever." Likewise, Vincent Turzo of Jefferies & Co. said, "When you say you're not going to carry something, of course the consumers rush to the stores to see what it's all about." Roberta Williams said of CompUSA's announcement: "I'm disappointed that they decided to make a stand with my product." Some smaller retailers also decided not to stock Phantasmagoria, but others like Walmart continued to carry it.

As well as the graphic gore and violence, the rape scene in Phantasmagoria drew particular attention and objections from the game's critics. One major newspaper claimed Phantasmagoria "makes a game of sexual violence." Multiple parents' groups, religious organizations, community action committees and special interest groups called for a boycott, and sent letters to the Sierra offices in droves voicing objections to the game. Phantasmagoria was unable to be sold in Australia after being refused classification by Office of Film and Literature Classification (the R 18+ classification was not available for video games at the time). The Roberta Williams Anthology collection was also banned in Australia because it featured a one-chapter preview of the game. The governments of two other countries also banned Phantasmagoria. The game was spotlighted in U.S. Senate hearings debating regulation of content in the computer software industry, and there was talk that it could re-ignite the debate in Congress over whether to impose federally mandated ratings on computer software that stores would be required to enforce.

Sierra found that Williams tended to garner extremely favorable press, even as Phantasmagoria got negative press, so the company began having her discuss the game in person. In response to the backlash, Williams said she believed computer games were subject to harsher standards than films and television, which she said often have more violent content than Phantasmagoria, in part because computer games are often regarded as children's entertainment rather than for adults. Williams said Phantasmagoria was less excessively violent than games like Doom and Mortal Kombat, and that unlike those games, Phantasmagoria is "the good guy ... not going around shooting up people." Sierra spokeswoman Rebecca Buxton and Dennis Cloutier, the company's vice president of sales, both expressed surprise at the reaction to the game because Sierra made strong efforts to warn viewers about the adult content in its marketing, box warnings and censoring options. Cloutier said the company was essentially "censoring ourselves." Steven L. Kent of The Seattle Times said there were more violent games than Phantasmagoria, but that most video game violence appears in computer animations, and thus can be more easily overlooked than in a live-action game, which elicits a stronger emotional response.

In April 1998, three years after the game was released, the Kentucky Teachers Retirement System came under criticism for owning 435,000 shares worth $9 million in Cendant, which by this point had purchased Sierra On-Line, due to the violence in Phantasmagoria and other Sierra games. Kentucky Sen. Mitch McConnell, Arkansas Gov. Mike Huckabee, Iowa Gov. Terry Branstad, and Lamar Alexander, the former governor of Tennessee, all asked the system to sell its stock. McConnell was particularly critical of the rape scene. They suggested a link existed between recent student slayings in West Paducah, Kentucky, and Jonesboro, Arkansas, and the "increasingly violent world many American children enter when they sit down in front of a computer screen." Pat Miller, executive secretary of the Kentucky Teachers Retirement System, said the system wasn't aware of Phantasmagoria or Sierra's products, and that it invested in Cendant because it's part of an index fund of the 500 best stocks in the country. Miller added that, if the retirement system finds a problem with Sierra On-Line, it would ask Cendant to cease ownership in the company, and that the system would divest its stock if it refused. Miller said: "We're not going to continue to invest in some company that does something that will be detrimental to our children. We know that our membership would not want us to do that." The same letter was also sent to heads of teachers' retirement systems in California, Ohio and Texas.

== Legacy ==
The commercial success of Phantasmagoria had a positive financial impact on Sierra On-Line. Before its release, the company's stock rose in July 1995, up $3.875 to $30.875, which Vince Turzo of Jeffries & Co attributed in part due to anticipation of Phantasmagoria. Sierra's stock continued to rise after it was released. The company closed on the NASDAQ stock market at $43.25 on September 8, 1995, translating to a 73 percent gain in less than three months, which Turzo attributed partially to Phantasmagoria's success. For the quarter ending September 30, 1995, Sierra posted a profit of $3.26 million, compared to a loss of $850,000 in 1994. This improvement exceeded expectations in analysts' forecasts, and was thanks largely to Phantasmagoria sales.

Williams returned to work on the King's Quest series after Phantasmagoria was completed. Sierra used the same technology and Hollywood techniques from Phantasmagoria to make The Beast Within: A Gabriel Knight Mystery (1995), another interactive movie adventure game. Williams later described Phantasmagoria as the game that best represented her career as a game designer. Due to its development delays, Phantasmagoria was released after other interactive movie games like Wing Commander III and Under a Killing Moon, so it did not receive as much credit for heralding that game subgenre as the other titles. Harley Jebens of the Austin American-Statesman said by the time it was finally released, "computer games that incorporate video [were] becoming a common sight on the software store racks." Sean Clark, a project leader at LucasArts, feared the success of Phantasmagoria would set a bad precedent in that software companies would think they need huge budgets and many discs to have a successful game, rather than focusing on quality.

== Sequel ==
A Phantasmagoria sequel, Phantasmagoria: A Puzzle of Flesh (1996), was released by Sierra a year after the original. It was written and designed by Lorelei Shannon, Roberta Williams' design partner on King's Quest VII. Williams was not involved with it, and the game featured a very different tone and completely different characters, with no direct connection to the storyline of the first game. Shannon said the original game was a haunted house story in the style of a "late night creature feature," while her game has more science-fiction and fantasy horror elements, in the style of the works of Clive Barker and Tanith Lee. Roberta Williams said both she and her husband Ken enjoyed the sequel. A preview for A Puzzle of Flesh was included in the first CD of the original Phantasmagoria game.

Ken Williams had wanted Roberta to work on a Phantasmagoria sequel immediately after the success of the first game, but she could not do so due to her obligations to King's Quest VIII. Ken Williams felt the sequel was less successful because players could sense the absence of Roberta's style. "It's as if a bestselling author had a book ghostwritten. Within a few pages, the fans would know they had been duped and feel disappointed, regardless of the quality of the work." Ken Williams said a third game was not produced after A Puzzle of Flesh because of issues after Sierra was acquired by CUC International in 1996. Distribution was handled by Davidson & Associates, another CUC company, which primarily sold educational software. Williams said the company was uncomfortable with the violent content in Phantasmagoria and did not attempt to sell the sequel as aggressively as Sierra would have. He also claimed Jan Davidson, the wife of Chairman and CEO Bob Davidson, personally did not like the game and "wanted it shut down." Due to these sales challenges, Williams said "there was no reason to make a third Phantasmagoria."

Roberta Williams said she was asked by Sierra to make a third Phantasmagoria game, and that she said she would consider it, but it was not ultimately made. Williams said:

Before I would even consider tackling a major project like that, though – and devoting a couple of years of my life to it – I would need a huge outpouring from all of those gamers out there that they would truly love to have another Phantas to play. If there is a big enough groundswell of support for another Phantasmagoria, and if Sierra hears it and begs me enough, I might consider it.

— Roberta Williams
