= King's Quest VII =

1994 video game

King's Quest VII: The Princeless Bride
- Developer: Sierra On-Line
- Publisher: Sierra On-Line
- Directors: Roberta Williams; Lorelei Shannon; Andy Hoyos
- Producers: Mark Seibert; Craig Alexander
- Designers: Lorelei Shannon; Roberta Williams
- Artists: Andy Hoyos; Marc Hudgins
- Writer: Lorelei Shannon
- Composers: Neal Grandstaff; Dan Kehler; Jay D. Usher
- Series: King's Quest
- Engine: Sierra's Creative Interpreter
- Platforms: MS-DOS, Windows, Macintosh
- Release: November 22, 1994
- Genre: Adventure game
- Mode: Single-player

King's Quest VII: The Princeless Bride is an adventure game developed by Sierra On-Line. It was published for MS-DOS, Windows, and Macintosh in 1994. The seventh entry in the King's Quest series, the game follows Queen Valanice and Princess Rosella of Daventry as they journey through the fairy tale-inspired realm of Eldritch, on a quest to find each other and save the realm from the evil enchantress Malicia. It is presented as an interconnected set of locations, or flip-screens, with a pseudo-3D art style. The player interacts with locations and items using a point-and-click interface, and must avoid numerous hazards and obstacles in their quest. The story is presented as a book, with the player able to jump to the start of any of the game's six chapters at will.

King's Quest VII was the second game in the series not to have Sierra co-founder Roberta Williams as the sole designer, with Lorelei Shannon serving as co-designer. Several of the lead development roles were shared with the contemporaneous Phantasmagoria (1995). VII, like prior games in the series, was designed as a blend of common fairy tales and fantasy tropes. The gameplay itself was designed to be more accessible to new players with only a single option to interact with elements on the screen, and breaking the game into chapters was intended to give players the feeling of reading a book. The art style was inspired by animated films by Walt Disney Pictures and Don Bluth.

The game was the 4th best-selling computer game of December 1994, and led the series to 3.8 million sales overall. Critics praised the graphics and animation as reminiscent of Disney films; opinions were mixed on the gameplay, with a variety of opinions on the difficulty of the game and how well it matched with the perceived audience of younger players given by the plot and art style. King's Quest VII was listed as one of the best adventure games of the year. It has been included in several compilation releases. The King's Quest series, which includes a single further game by Sierra, has been termed its flagship series.

== Gameplay ==
Valanice in the desert. The player has two items in their inventory.

King's Quest VII is a single-player adventure game set in the fairy tale-inspired realm of Eldritch, in which the player alternates controlling the characters Queen Valanice and Princess Rosella to find each other and save the realm from the evil enchantress Malicia. The game world is divided into dozens of locations, or flip-screens, with one location visible at a time. These locations are presented in pseudo-3D as if viewed from the side, with the player moving the character around the screen in front of and behind other elements of the location. Occasionally, large environments are traversed across a continuous, panning screen instead of being divided into multiple static screens.

In addition to moving the character, the player can interact with the objects, obstacles, and creatures within the location. This is done using a point-and-click interface, where relevant elements are highlighted when hovered over, and the player clicks on the element to be interacted with. Many items can be taken and put in the player's inventory, visible at the bottom of the screen; most are used to solve puzzles or unlock new locations by selecting them and then clicking on an element to use them contextually. Items can also be viewed and rotated as 3D objects using the eye icon next to the inventory. Some items can be combined or taken apart.

Some locations have other characters which Valanice or Rosella can talk to with voice acted lines or who may kill them. They can also die from numerous hazards in the game, such as drowning or falling; upon death, the game will rewind to just before the last action was taken. There is only one saved game, referred to as a bookmark, which tracks the player's progress through the game; the player can also jump to the beginning of any of the game's six chapters at any time. The chapters alternate between the player controlling Valanice and Rosella, with the characters sometimes journeying through the same locations as each other at different times.

== Plot ==
Queen Valanice and Princess Rosella of Daventry are walking in a forest as Valanice pressures her daughter to find a prince to marry. Rosella resents the idea, wanting to have another adventure as she had in King's Quest IV (1988). An odd creature jumps out of a pond and Rosella sees a castle beneath the surface, and she jumps in. Valanice jumps in after her, with both finding themselves within a magical portal. Rosella is pulled away, and Valanice arrives in a desert. Seeking to find her daughter, Valanice escapes the desert and finds herself in a magical forest; she learns that they are in Eldritch, a realm of magic that is threatened by an evil enchantress named Malicia. Once she leaves the forest, she arrives at the town of Falderal, home to anthropomorphic animals, and is promptly arrested for stealing the moon from the sky.

Rosella finds herself in the Vulcanix Underground, a kingdom beneath Eldritch inhabited by trolls and ruled over by King Otar, who desires to marry her. Finding herself transformed into a troll, and repulsed by the marriage proposal, Rosella works to reverse the transformation and escape Vulcanix. She learns that the king is working with Malicia to build a machine that controls a volcano powerful enough to destroy Eldritch, only to find that he is an imposter, and the real Otar is being held prisoner in the Land of Ooga Booga, to which she escapes. She rescues Otar, but, unable to return the way she came, the pair steal a mysterious device from Malicia's home and make their way to Falderal, where they discover the imposter prepping the volcano for an eruption.

Meanwhile, Valanice returns the moon to the sky, and travels to Ooga Booga helping the inhabitants. She journeys to Etheria, a kingdom in the sky, where she finds that King Oberon and Queen Titania, the rulers of Etheria who can stop the volcano's eruption, are currently away trying to find their missing son. She finds her way to Mab, the Lady of Dreams, and frees her from ice so as to contact Oberon and Titania and bring them back to prevent the eruption.

Rosella stops Otar's imposter by restoring them to their true self: Edgar, a man she had met in her previous adventure. Rosella helps Otar shut down the volcano's eruption. Moments later, Edgar brings Valanice to reunite with Rosella, only for Malicia to try to kill her; Edgar prevents this, dying from her magic, before Rosella uses the device she took to magically turn Malicia into an infant. Rosella revives Edgar with an extra life she received from a black cat she saved, bringing him back to life. Oberon and Titania soon arrive, revealing Edgar to be their missing son and Malicia as Titania's sister. Titania vows to raise Malicia in hopes that she will not fall to evil again. Edgar explains that he was the one to lure Rosella to Eldritch and apologizes before requesting her permission to court her. Rosella agrees, leading the pair to fly away in a white swan-like carriage as the realm celebrates their union. In an alternate ending if Rosella fails to revive Edgar, Oberon and Titania explain what happened to him before taking Valanice and Rosella home in a black carriage.

== Development and release ==
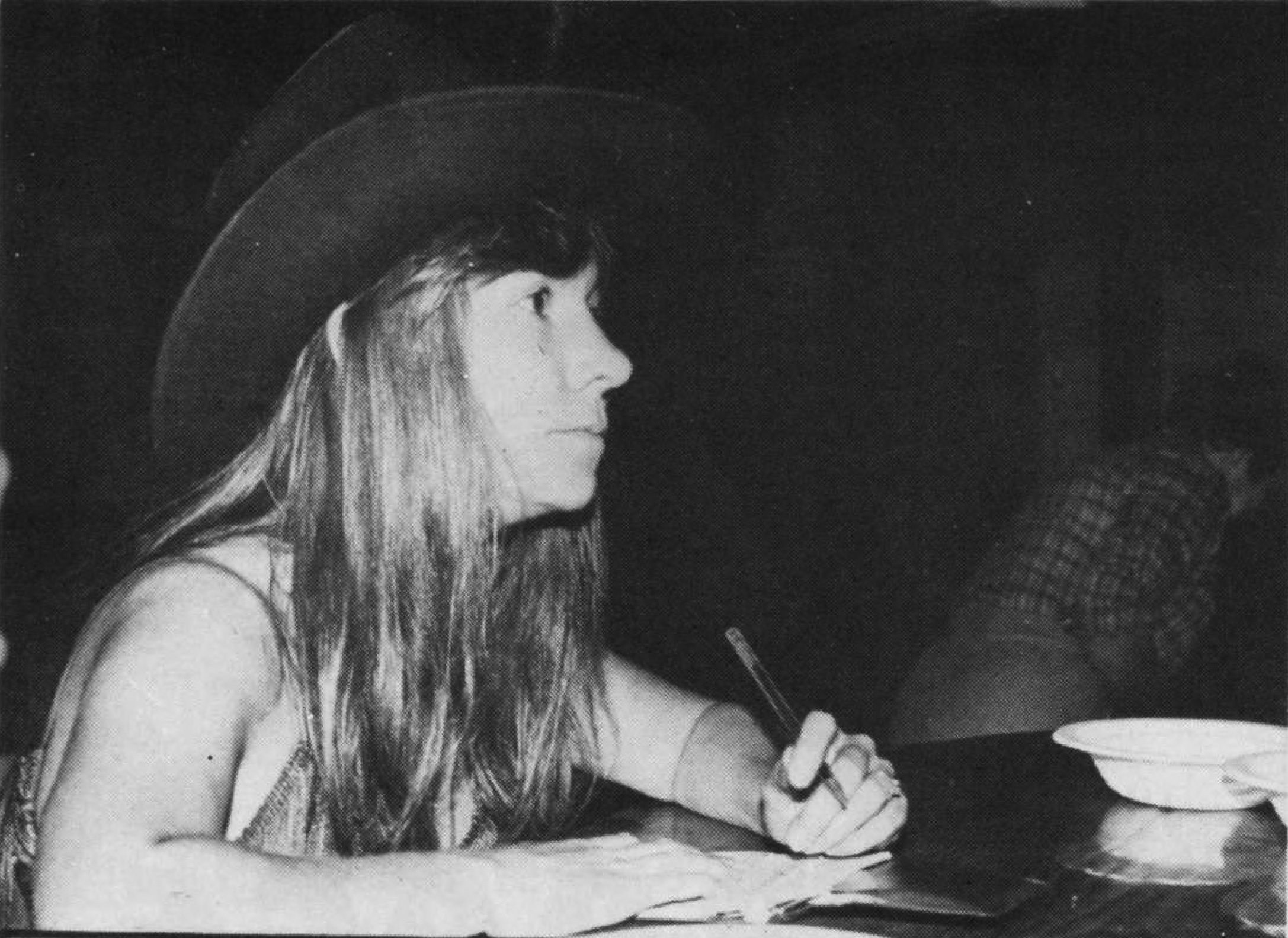
Roberta Williams in 1981

Sierra On-Line was founded in 1979 by Roberta and Ken Williams as On-Line Systems, and in 1984 released King's Quest, later termed King's Quest I, with Roberta Williams as designer alongside a team of six programmers and artists. She made the game world as a blend of common fairy tales that could be directly experienced as a game. It was followed by five sequels between 1985 and 1992, and after their release Sierra began working on a seventh title in the series.

King's Quest VII was the second game in the series not to have Roberta Williams as the sole designer, after King's Quest VI (1992); she was joined by Lorelei Shannon, who had previously co-designed Pepper's Adventures in Time (1993). Williams also designed Phantasmagoria (1995) at the same time; both games also shared Andy Hoyos as art director and Mark Seibert as producer. Mark Hudgins was the lead animator. The art style of the game was inspired by animated films by Walt Disney Pictures and Don Bluth, particularly Aladdin (1992). Nearly 100 hand-painted backgrounds were made for the scenes in the game. The character animations were also hand-drawn and colored digitally, and were made both by Sierra and by multiple contracted companies. Jay Usher, Mark Seibert, and Neal Grandstaff composed around 120 pieces of music for the game.

Shannon and Williams began working together at the start of the project, developing the story and the puzzles. Williams wanted to have Princess Rosella return as a protagonist after previously leading King's Quest IV, and Shannon wanted Queen Valanice to debut as protagonist, leading to the combination of both ideas. The first four King's Quest games had used a text parser interface, which was replaced for King's Quest V (1990) and VI with an icon-based point and click interface wherein the player would select to talk, touch, or look at elements on the screen; for VII, the interface was simplified to only have a single option to interact with the goal of making the game more accessible to new players. Breaking the game into chapters and allowing players to select any chapter to play was intended to give players the feeling of reading a book, where they could know how far they were through the game at any point and re-read the parts they wanted.

Sierra first announced the game at the Consumer Electronics Show in June 1994, with a planned release that year. A demo of the game was released shortly before launch. The game was released on CD for MS-DOS, Windows, and Macintosh on November 22, 1994, the first in the series to not have a floppy disk version.

== Reception ==
Reception

Review scores
Publication	Score
Computer Game Review	86%
Computer Gaming World	4/5
Next Generation	4/5
PC Gamer (US)	84%
PC Zone	90%
The Games Machine (Italy)	89%
MacFormat	80%

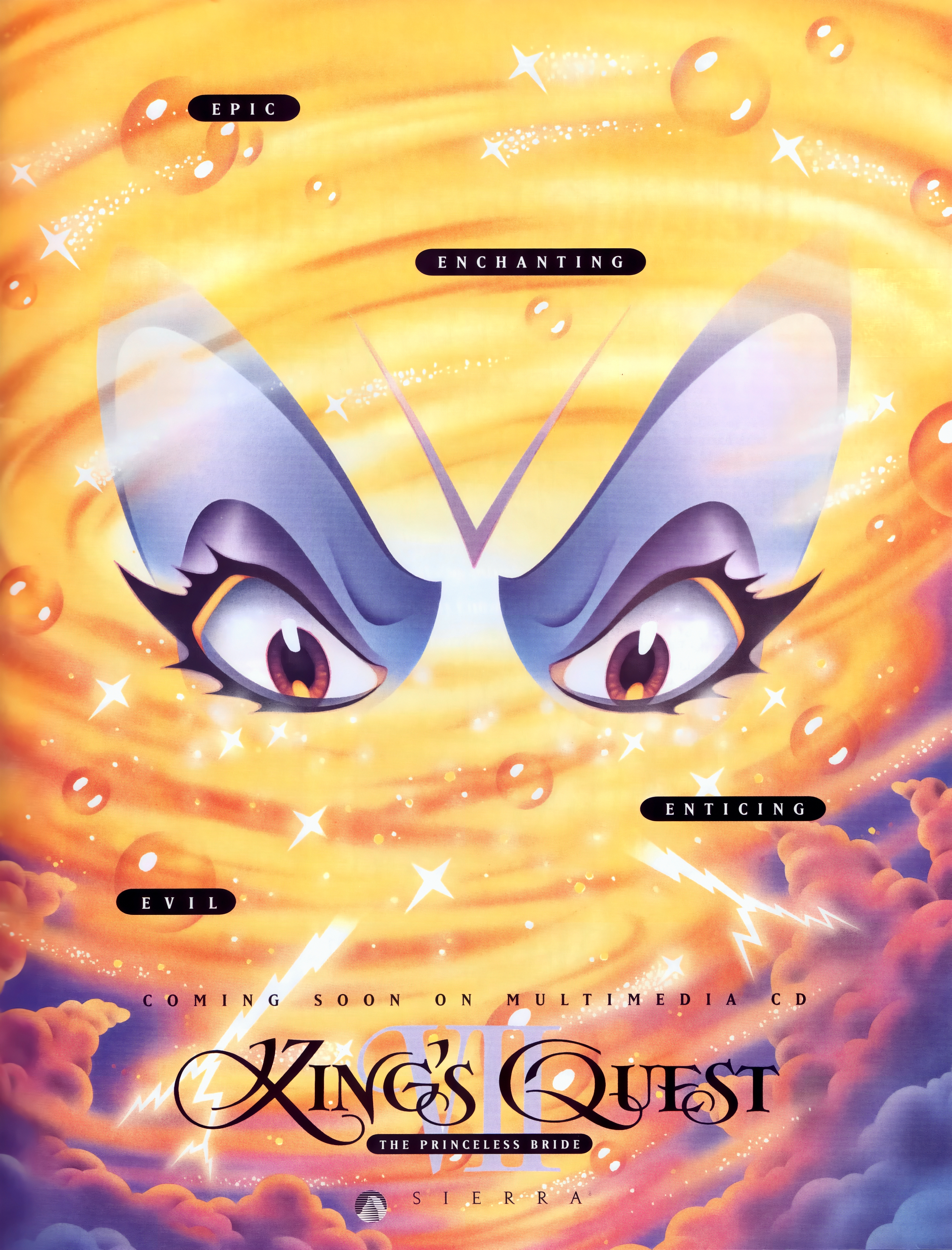
Magazine ad for the game

King's Quest VII was the 4th best-selling computer game of December 1994, dropping to 13th the following month and remaining in the top 20 until April, according to PC Data. It later reported that King's Quest VII's sales in the United States alone reached between 300,000 and 400,000 units.

Opinions on the gameplay were mixed. Some reviewers, such as Next Generation and Charles Ardai of Computer Gaming World, found the difficulty of the puzzles to be very easy, and PC Gamer's Leslie Mizell said it was "fairly simple to get through" and that the "gameplay seems to have been shoved aside". Steve Bauman of Computer Games Strategy Plus and Al Giovetti of Electronic Entertainment, however, felt it was standard for an adventure game. MacFormat and Zach Meston of Computer Player felt that some of the puzzles were too challenging for children despite the game's presentation seeming to be aimed at including them as players, though The Games Machine's Daniele Lepido felt they were accessible to a broad audience. Computer Player additionally felt that the puzzles were not interesting, and one of the three reviewers for Computer Game Review felt they devolved to "random clicking". Several reviewers complained that the game was very slow; Computer Games Strategy Plus and Computer Game Review attributed this to the gameplay itself, particularly moving around the screen, with Strategy Plus saying it "moves at a rather leisurely pace". Many others, though, including Aktueller Software Markt and Teresa Maughan of PC Zone, said that the game itself played animations slowly, especially on weaker computers.

The graphics were widely praised; Computer Gaming World called it "a visual marvel from beginning to end" and PC Zone said that "the attention to detail is amazing". Several reviewers, including Computer Games Strategy Plus, Electronic Entertainment, The Games Machine, and Aktueller Software Markt, directly and favorably compared it to a Walt Disney Pictures movie. PC Gamer and Computer Game Review said it was not quite at that level and compared it instead to a Don Bluth film. Computer Games Strategy Plus said that the story was well-suited to families, though Computer Gaming World and PC Zone said that Sierra had removed any element that was scary or not cute enough to a level beyond that of a Disney film, and Computer Player said the story was uninteresting and "ho-hum". The Games Machine, PC Zone, and Computer Player said that the voice acting was excellent, though PC Gamer felt that the acting itself was overwrought. Next Generation, PC Gamer and PC Zone all praised the music, with the latter two also praising the sound effects.

== Legacy ==
According to Sierra On-Line, combined sales of the King's Quest series surpassed 3.8 million units by the end of March 1996; upon the release of King's Quest VII it had said 2.5 million sales overall, which it claimed was the most of any computer game series. King's Quest VII was nominated for Computer Game of the Year by the Academy of Interactive Arts & Sciences at The Second Annual AIAS Awards. Computer Gaming World nominated it as its 1994 "Adventure of the Year", although it lost to Relentless: Twinsen's Adventure.

The King's Quest series, which has been described as Sierra's "flagship series", includes a single further game by Sierra, King's Quest: Mask of Eternity in 1998. King's Quest VII has been released in several collections of games in the series in the 1990s and 2000s. It is also included in the modern King's Quest Collection on Steam and the King's Quest 7+8 collection released on GOG. In 1988, Silicon Valley Books published The King's Quest Companion, a combination hint guide and novelization by Peter Spear of the games in the series. Updated editions were released through 1997 as further games were released in the series.

== Sources ==
- Mills, Shawn (2020). The Sierra Adventure: The Story of Sierra On-Line. ISBN 978-1-71675-872-0.
- Shannon, Lorelei (1994). King's Quest VII: The Princeless Bride (PDF). Sierra On-Line.
- Spear, Peter (1997). The King's Quest Companion (4th ed.). Osborne/McGraw-Hill. ISBN 0-07-882401-X.
- Trivette, Donald B. (1988). The Official Book of King's Quest: Daventry and Beyond (PDF) (1st ed.). Compute! Books. ISBN 0-87455-155-2.
