= At Home with the Webbers =

1993 American television film

- Genre: Adventure; Comedy; Drama
- Written by: Brad Marlowe
- Directed by: Brad Marlowe
- Starring: Jeffrey Tambor; Jennifer Tilly; David Arquette
- Music by: Anthony Guefen
- Country of origin: United States
- Original language: English

Production
- Executive producer: Taro Tanabe
- Producers: Mike Erwin; J. Max Kirishima; Brad Marlowe; Susan Marlowe
- Production location: Los Angeles
- Cinematography: Irv Goodnoff
- Editor: Jonas Thaler
- Running time: 118 minutes
- Production company: Den Pictures

Original release
- Release: April 24, 1993

At Home with the Webbers is a 1993 American comedy drama television film directed by Brad Marlowe. Starring Jeffrey Tambor, Jennifer Tilly and David Arquette, the film centers on a typical American family who are cast in a reality TV series.

== Cast ==
- Jeffrey Tambor as Gerald Webber
- Rita Taggart as Emma Webber
- Jennifer Tilly as Miranda Webber
- David Arquette as Johnny Webber
- Brian Bloom as Josh
- Jenny O'Hara as Mrs. Nelson
- Darren Epton as Mike
- Lesley Sachs as Billy
- Gabriel Jarret as Thomas
- Caroline Goodall as Karen James
- Robby Benson as Roger Swade
- Johnathon Schaech as Giampaolo
- Victoria Hemingson as Stripper
- Alyssa Milano as Fan (cameo appearance)
- Luke Perry as Garbage Guy (cameo appearance)
