= Rosemary Edghill =

American writer and editor (1956–2026)

- Born: 1956
- Died: April 7, 2026 (aged 69)
- Occupations: Writer; editor
- Writing career
- Pen name: eluki bes shahar
- Genres: Science fiction; fantasy; Regency romance

Rosemary Edghill (1956 – April 7, 2026) was an American writer and editor. She also wrote under the names James Mallory and eluki bes shahar (lower case intentional). Her primary genres were science fiction and fantasy, but she began by writing Regency romance novels.

== Career ==
The publishers of her first novel felt that "eluki bes shahar" (her legal name at the time) sounded insufficiently English to attract readers, so she adopted the pen-name Rosemary Edghill, which became her legal name in 2004. Her sister, a reference librarian, writes as India Edghill.

Edghill cited some of her influences:

Too many to count. Damon Runyon and Mark Twain, for use of language. C. L. Moore and Eric Frank Russell, ditto. For storybuilding and sheer artfulness, John Le Carre. For language (again!) Margaret Atwood. For a great story, which is the First Thing in my book, John D. MacDonald, Peter O'Donnell, Ian Fleming, Leslie Charteris, Raymond Chandler, Dashiell Hammett (and we're back to the language thing again). Kipling. Poe. Clark Ashton Smith. Robert E. Howard. Robert A. Heinlein. Lovecraft. For that matter, I think I owe as much to the great editors of SF's silver age as to the writers, so here's to you: John W. Campbell, Groff Conklin, and Damon Knight.

She collaborated in writing fiction with Andre Norton, Mercedes Lackey, and Marion Zimmer Bradley. Her books with Andre Norton include Shadow of Albion and Leopard in Exile. Her books with Mercedes Lackey include Spirits White as Lightning and Mad Maudlin.

== Personal life and death ==
Edghill lived in upstate New York with cats and King Charles Spaniels. She trained and showed her dogs in obedience competitions.

Edghill died of sepsis on April 7, 2026, at the age of 69.

== Bibliography ==
According to WorldCat, her bibliography is as follows:

=== Regency Romances ===
- Turkish Delight (1987)
- Two of a Kind (1988)
- The Ill-Bred Bride (1990)
- Fleeting Fancy (1993)

=== Hellflower series ===
The Hellflower series features Butterfly St Cyr, a female starpilot trying to make a living as a tramp cargo hauler, as she befriends Valijon Starbringer (or, as Butterfly calls him, "Tiggy Stardust") a teenage hellflower (slang for a mercenary) who is totally out of his depth.

1. Hellflower (1991) (reprinted in 2022 by Ring of Fire Press, ISBN 978-1956015508)
2. Darktraders (1992) (reprinted in 2022 by Ring of Fire Press, ISBN 978-1956015706)
3. Archangel Blues (1993) (reprinted in 2022 by Ring of Fire Press, ISBN 979-8887450049)

The three were collected in: Butterfly and Hellflower (1993); hardcover, omnibus ed., 640 pages, published by New York Guild America Books (ISBN 9781568650487)

=== Bast series ===
The Bast series features an amateur female detective who is a New York City Wiccan. They were collected in Bell, Book, and Murder.

1. Speak Daggers to Her (1994)
2. Book of Moons (1995)
3. The Bowl of Night (1996)

=== The Twelve Treasures ===
1. The Empty Crown (SFBC Omnibus Edition of the three "Twelve Treasures" novels)(1997)
2. The Sword of Maiden's Tears (1994)
3. The Cup of Morning Shadows (1995)
4. The Cloak of Night and Daggers (1997)

=== Others ===
- King's Quest VI: Heir Today, Gone Tomorrow novelization (1992), in The King's Quest Companion.
- Smoke and Mirrors (1997) (not to be confused with Smoke and Mirrors (2005) by Tanya Huff)
- Met by Moonlight (1998)
- The Warslayer (2002)
- Vengeance of Masks (2003)
- Paying the Piper at the Gates of Dawn and Other Stories (2003)

with Marion Zimmer Bradley

- Ghostlight (1995)
- Witchlight (1996)
- Gravelight (1997)
- Heartlight (1998)

with Tom DeFalco

- Time's Arrow: The Future (X-Men & Spider-Man #3) (1998)

with Andre Norton

- The Shadow of Albion (Carolus Rex, Bk 1) (1999)
- Leopard in Exile (Carolus Rex, Bk 2) (2001)

with Mercedes Lackey

- Beyond World's End (2001)
- Spirits White as Lightning (2001)
- Mad Maudlin (2003)
- Bedlam's Edge (2005)
- Music to My Sorrow (Bedlam's Bard) (2005)
- Dead Reckoning (2012)
- The Shadow Grail series
  1. Legacies (2010)
  2. Conspiracies (2011)
  3. Sacrifices (2013)
  4. Victories (2014)

with Mercedes Lackey (as James Mallory)

- The Obsidian Mountain Trilogy
  1. The Outstretched Shadow (2003)
  2. To Light a Candle (2004)
  3. When Darkness Falls (2006)
- The Enduring Flame Trilogy
  1. The Phoenix Unchained (2007)
  2. The Phoenix Endangered (2008)
  3. The Phoenix Transformed (2009)
- The Dragon Prophecy Trilogy
  1. Crown of Vengeance (2012)
  2. Blade of Empire (2017)
  3. Deliverance of Dragons (2025)

=== Short fiction ===
- "The Ever-After" in Dragon Magazine (1989) and anthologized in A Dragon-Lover's Treasury of the Fantastic (1994)
- "Child of Ocean" in Dragon Magazine (1991)
- "Is Your Coworker a Space Alien?" (1994)
- "The New Britomart" (1995)
- "To Light Such a Candle" (1995)
- "An Axe for Men" in Young Warriors: Stories of Strength (2005)
