= Phantasmagoria: A Puzzle of Flesh =

1996 video game

- Developer: Sierra On-Line
- Publisher: Sierra On-Line
- Director: Andy Hoyos
- Producer: Matthew Thornton
- Designer: Lorelei Shannon
- Writer: Lorelei Shannon
- Platforms: MS-DOS, Microsoft Windows
- Release: NA: November 26, 1996; EU: 1997
- Genres: Interactive movie, point-and-click adventure
- Mode: Single-player

Phantasmagoria: A Puzzle of Flesh (also known as Phantasmagoria 2) is an interactive movie point-and-click adventure game released by Sierra On-Line. The game was released in North America on November 26, 1996. Though technically a sequel to Roberta Williams' 1995 game Phantasmagoria, Puzzle of Flesh shares no connections with its predecessor in plot nor characters, as Sierra initially intended the Phantasmagoria title to be a horror anthology, with each installment of a different story and style. While not a critical or commercial success, A Puzzle of Flesh, like its predecessor, is remembered for its controversial violent and sexual content, which led the game to be heavily censored or banned outright in several European and Oceanic countries. Also like its predecessor, it could not fit on one piece of media, and was released on five CD-ROM discs.

== Plot ==
The player controls Curtis Craig, an introverted 26-year-old man who works at a pharmaceutical company. Curtis regularly has disturbing hallucinations at his office, seeing flashes of gore or getting odd e-mails (for example, one claims to be from Hell offering him a job as a murderer).

Curtis was released from a mental institution one year before, and following the onset of his visions, he has regular visits with a therapist. His mental health problems largely stem from childhood trauma: an abusive mother who committed suicide and a father who, before he died in an auto accident, was working on a top secret project at Wyntech, the same company where Curtis is currently employed. Curtis has repressed most of his childhood memories, and over the course of the game he remembers details that suggest his father was murdered by Wyntech for reasons related to the aforementioned project.

One day, Curtis' workplace rival, Bob, is found brutally murdered in Curtis' cubicle. Though Bob was generally disliked by the whole office, Curtis had expressed the joking desire to kill him and feels apathy towards his death, which leads Curtis to fear he may have murdered Bob in a psychotic break. This incident impacts the myriad of other relationships in the office. While Curtis has been dating his commitment-seeking coworker Jocilyn, he also becomes involved with a more adventurous coworker, Therese, who on a first date introduces him to the local BDSM scene. Another coworker and best friend, Trevor, is an openly homosexual man, and Curtis admits to his therapist that he is attracted to Trevor.

After Curtis' superior Tom is murdered as well, Curtis suspects his boss, Paul Allen Warner, who had threatened Tom during an argument the previous day. The next day, Therese is found murdered after her date with Curtis, placing more suspicion upon him by the police. Curtis eventually discovers this is all connected to "Threshold," the project his father worked on with Warner. Decades prior, Wyntech discovered a rift leading to "Dimension X" in the basement of their building and sought to use it for monetary gain by selling teleportation technology to the United States government, performing experiments first with animal subjects and later mental patients supplied by the corrupt Dr. Marek, who was employed at the asylum where Curtis was later committed. Desperate for better results, Warner took advantage of Curtis' father, bringing the child to work and using Curtis as a subject—without his father's permission—although Curtis was quickly returned from the rift. The project was shut down when the military showed no interest, but reactivated when Warner discovered the inhabitants of Dimension X could synthesize any chemical desired at the cost of some components and a couple of "human specimens." Warner planned on sacrificing as many people as necessary in exchange for a highly addictive antidepressant/weight loss drug which would then be released on the market, causing the Earth's population to become reliant on the product and making Wyntech the most powerful corporation on Earth.

As Curtis comes closer to the truth, his therapist and Trevor are murdered, causing Curtis to finally confront Warner. Warner, however, is knocked out by a humanoid creature (identified in FMV scene selection as "the Hecatomb") that introduces itself as a manifestation of the "real" Curtis Craig. The child Curtis that returned from the rift is in fact an alien duplicate while the real Curtis was trapped in Dimension X, experimented upon, hideously mutated, and developed vast psychic powers—and madness—as a result. The real Curtis, acting through the Hecatomb, was responsible for the murders and hallucinations, with the purpose of driving the duplicate Curtis insane. This would allow the real Curtis to psychically take over the duplicate's body, regaining the life the duplicate unintentionally stole. The duplicate Curtis escapes the Hecatomb through the Dimension X portal, kills the real Curtis, and returns to Earth.

Jocilyn suddenly appears, revealing that she knows the truth. A message from the inhabitants of Dimension X is heard, asking Curtis to return since he doesn't belong on Earth. The player then has the choice of two endings: either Curtis chooses to leave, in which case he spends one last day with Jocilyn before departing, or he chooses to remain on Earth. If the player chooses the latter, the ending sequence shows Jocilyn happily talking about everyday life arrangements to Curtis, who curls up an anxious fist beneath the table. The fist briefly morphs into a grotesque alien shape.

Prior to either ending, the scene implies Curtis puts the still-unconscious Warner through the rift. A post-credits scene in Dimension X shows the still-living severed head of Warner suspended in bio-organic matter.

== Gameplay ==
The basic aspects of a point-and-click adventure game are here; as Curtis the player travels to various locations, interact with the often strange and eccentric people in his life, and collects items and solves puzzles.

A Puzzle of Flesh's gameplay features a standard point-and-click interface, played from a third-person perspective: the cursor, when waved over an object or area that can be manipulated, will highlight, and clicking it will initiate a live-action clip that furthers the game along. Inventory is stored along the bottom of the screen and a simple click-and-drag command will cause inventory items to interact with other objects.

Due to the large amount of graphic violence and sexual content, A Puzzle of Flesh came with password-enabled parental controls that thoroughly edited out the game's offensive content.

A Puzzle of Flesh also has a large number of comedic Easter eggs, which the player can achieve on a point system, although, due to some of the complex key commands one must perform to enable them, most of them are impossible to access without outside help. These Easter eggs range from simple sight gags and messages to minigames and hidden videos.

== Production ==
Lorelei Shannon, who had previously served as a writer on the Roberta Williams games King's Quest VII and The Dagger of Amon Ra, was selected to take on the task of writing and designing the sequel to Williams' Phantasmagoria. While the first installment was a supernatural horror in the tradition of The Shining and the works of Stephen King, Shannon redeveloped the series into a more modern, urban setting and utilized a psychological horror approach with science fiction undertones; Shannon has said the game was influenced by such authors as Edgar Allan Poe, Charles Beaumont, and Shirley Jackson, and was influenced visually by Joel-Peter Witkin and the film Seven. In several interviews, Shannon noted a fondness for Jacob's Ladder and admiration for the work of Clive Barker. According to Shannon, the title A Puzzle of Flesh "refers to the puzzle of who Curtis really is, and the fact that his flesh is not his own."

While Phantasmagoria was shot with live actors super-imposed in bluescreen backgrounds, A Puzzle of Flesh was filmed on set and on location, not unlike a regular feature film (although the game's final scenes, in the Alien World, were shot on bluescreen). Filming took place in and around Seattle, Washington from February to September 1996. Shot on Digital Betacam, nearly four and a half hours of video was shot, from a script over 200 pages long. Much of Shannon's original script had to be cut due to budget constraints, including a lengthy series of puzzles in the mental hospital and some scenes on the alien world.

For a while, Sierra was planning Phantasmagoria 3, and had asked Roberta Williams to return as its lead designer. However, after the commercial disappointment of A Puzzle of Flesh, along with the decline of the point-and-click adventure with interactive movie genres, the project never materialized.

A Puzzle of Flesh was developed on a budget of $4.5 million.

The game was banned in Singapore, and heavily censored in Australia.

=== Cast and crew ===
A Puzzle of Flesh's live action sequences were written by Lorelei Shannon, directed by Andy Hoyos, filmed by cinematographer Matthew Jensen and edited by Wes Plate. The cast was as follows:

- Paul Morgan Stetler – Curtis Craig
- Monique Parent – Jocilyn Rowan
- Paul Mitri – Trevor Barnes
- Ragna Sigrúnardóttir (billed as Ragna Sigrun) – Therese Banning
- Warren Burton – Paul Allen Warner
- Michael Taylor Donovan – Tom Ravell
- Don Berg – Bob Arnold
- Cynthia Steele – Dr. Rikki Harburg
- Regina Byrd Smith – Detective Allie Powell
- Michael David Simms – Dr. Terrance Marek

Additionally, actress V. Joy Lee, who played "Harriet" in the first Phantasmagoria, returns in the sequel as "The Ratwoman", a mental patient. Lorelei Shannon makes two cameos, as a mental patient and a gas masked patron at an S&M club, and director Hoyos makes an appearance as yet another mental patient.

== Reception ==
Reception

Aggregate score
| Aggregator | Score |
|---|---|
| GameRankings | 55.88% |

Review scores
| Publication | Score |
|---|---|
| Computer Gaming World | 1.5/5 |
| GameSpot | 3.7/10 |
| Next Generation | 3/5 |
| PC Games | C+ |

A Puzzle of Flesh received primarily negative reviews from mainstream game reviewers. Much criticism was targeted at the illogical puzzles, low difficulty, and the lack of interactivity caused by the large amount of FMV. Multiple reviewers made particular mention of a puzzle near the beginning of the game in which Curtis must retrieve his wallet from under his couch, not by moving the couch, but by manipulating a rat into fetching the wallet for him.

Reactions towards the plot and cinematic production were also largely negative. A Next Generation critic commended the script and direction for being "even more dark and twisted" and "kinky" than the original Phantasmagoria, but nonetheless found Sierra's marketing the game as featuring "intense content" to be ridiculous, noting that the sex and gore are tame compared to a number of movies that one could find at the local video rental store or on late night television. PC Games razed the story, citing numerous plot holes, gratuitous sex scenes, and poor pacing: "At times, Curtis seems to lurch from one crisis to another, but always recovers instantly from experiences that would send most of us shrieking back to the bin. Flesh just keeps throwing stuff at us in the hope that something will stick." GameSpot called it clichéd and absurd, summarizing "As the credits rolled, all I felt was regret—regret that I had spent a good chunk of my life in this ugly world, with annoying, unappealing characters and their silly problems". Game Revolution's review was similar, calling the game "a predictable, dissatisfying mess". Computer Gaming World commented that while the technical aspects of the cinematics are well done, they are wasted on a storyline which suffers from an absurd plot, gratuitous sex and gore, and a "completely unsympathetic, amoral, and quite uninteresting" protagonist.

The most common subject of praise for the game was the music, which even otherwise wholly negative reviews mentioned as being successfully atmospheric and dissonant.

Response within the community was a bit more positive, with likewise criticism directed at the gameplay and structure, though more praise was given to the game's storyline. The adventure game-focused site Adventure Gamers gave A Puzzle of Flesh a rating of 2.5 out of 5, finding flaws in both its story and cinematic production, but noting that those looking for light entertainment will have "a hell of a lot of fun". Similar sites, such as Adventure Classic Gaming, called the plot "intriguing and well executed", though its gameplay "falls short to qualify as a mediocre adventure game". Just Adventure was a bit kinder in a way, saying that "it's trashy, it's tacky, it's badly acted, it's badly cast, it's ugly, and it's short. Also, like Phantasmagoria, it's a lot of fun", and "It's a guilty pleasure, but a pleasure nonetheless", likening it to watching a good B movie.

In later years, the game's reputation has improved somewhat, gaining a cult following. Retrospective critics have paid particular attention to the game as an early instance of LGBTQ representation in video games. Curtis Craig, as a canonically bisexual man, is considered to be the first LGBTQ protagonist in a commercially released video game. The game has been praised for its depiction of queer characters, being called "remarkably progressive for the period in which it was released."
