= Lorelei Shannon =

American writer

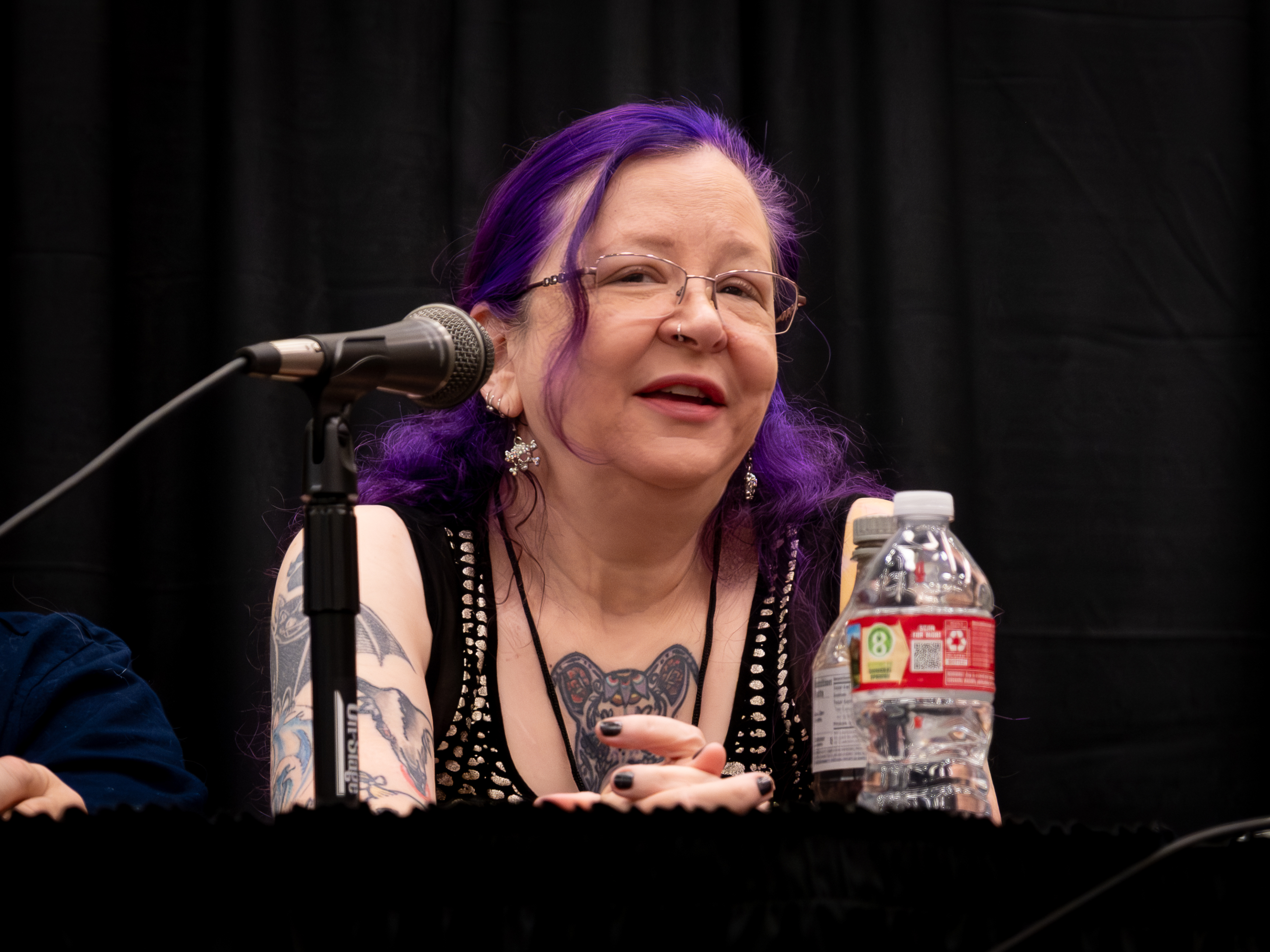
- Shannon at the Adventure Game Fan Fair in Tacoma, Washington, July 2024
- Born: 1965 (age 60–61); Mesa, Arizona
- Occupations: Author, game designer, screenwriter, voice actress, director, casting director, voice director
- Years active: 1990–2009
- Known for: horror and computer games
- Notable work: King's Quest VII, Phantasmagoria: A Puzzle of Flesh

Lorelei Shannon (born 1965 in Mesa, Arizona) is an American writer of horror and computer games.

Shannon is the author of a number of books and short stories. Her work has been listed in The Supernatural Index: A Listing of Fantasy, Supernatural, Occult, Weird, and Horror Anthologies, by Mike Ashley and William G. Contento. She co-edited the anthology Hours of Darkness for Scorpius Digital Publishing, which contained stories by well-known horror authors such as Ramsey Campbell, Peter Crowther, Dennis Etchison, Joe R. Lansdale, and Richard Christian Matheson.

She is a designer and screenwriter for three games from Sierra On-Line. Shannon co-designed King's Quest VII, a 1994 installment in Sierra Entertainment's King's Quest computer game series, with Sierra founder Roberta Williams. Shannon's sequel to Roberta Williams's horror game Phantasmagoria, called Phantasmagoria: A Puzzle of Flesh, caused a storm of controversy when it was banned in Singapore and Australia for violent and sexual content. Sears stores throughout the U.S. refused to carry the game. Throughout Shannon's time at Sierra On-Line, she wrote material for many classic Sierra games such as Laura Bow and Police Quest, and worked with many of Sierra's "stars", such as Scott Murphy, Al Lowe, Corey Cole, Josh Mandel, and Jane Jensen.

Shannon has also worked as a technical documentation, director, voice actress, casting director and voice director.

Shannon founded the Rain City Hearse Club in 2002.

== Bibliography ==
=== Book-length works ===
- Vermifuge and Other Toxic Cocktails. Short story collection. Wildside Press, 2001.
- Rags and Old Iron. Wildside Press, 2002, and Juno Books, 2007.
- The Blood of Father Time: The Mystic Clan’s Grand Plot. With Alan M. Clark and Stephen C. Merritt. Five Star Science Fiction and Fantasy Series, 2007
- The Blood of Father Time: The New Cut. With Alan M. Clark and Stephen C. Merritt. Five Star Science Fiction and Fantasy Series, 2007.
- Possum Kingdom. Virtual Bookworm Publishing, 2009.
- Mad Madame Lalaurie: New Orleans' Most Famous Murderess Revealed (With Victoria Cosner Love) The History Press, 2011.

=== Game manuals ===
- King's Quest I: Quest for the Crown Hintbook, 1990
- King's Quest VI: Heir Today, Gone Tomorrow Hintbook, 1992
- King's Quest VII: Official Hint Guide, 1994
- Phantasmagoria: The Official Sierra Insider's Guide, 1995

=== Computer games ===
- Pepper's Adventures in Time. Sierra On-Line, 1993.
- King's Quest VII. Sierra On-Line, 1994.
- Phantasmagoria: A Puzzle of Flesh. Sierra On-Line, 1996.

=== Short fiction ===
- “Whitechapel Rose.” Into the Shadows. Ed. Jordan K. Weisman. FASA Corporation, 1991.
- “Poison.” Midnight Zoo, volume 3, issue 35. Ed. Jon L. Herron. 1993.
- “Anything for You.” Young Blood. Ed. Mike Baker. Zebra Publishing, 1994.
- “The Tail of the Sixth Emperor.” Rat Tails. Ed. Jon Gustafson. Pulphouse Publishing, 1994.
- “Gabriel’s Gargoyle.” New Altars. Eds. Dawn Albright and Sandra J. Hutchinson. Angelus Press, 1997.
- “For Great is Truth, and Shall Prevail.” Carpe Noctem, issue 14. Eds. Catia & Carnell. 1998.
- “Peggy Sue Got Slobbered.” Prom Night Ed. Nancy Springer. Daw Books, 1999.
- “The Virgin Spring.” Embraces. Ed. Paula Guran. Venus Or Vixen Press, 2000.
- “Black Dogs.” Out of Avalon II anthology. Ed. Jennifer Roberson. Daw Books, 2001.
- “The Little Spark." Horror Garage Magazine issue #4. Ed. Paula Guran. 2005.
- “Judgment.” Pirates of the Blue Kingdoms Eds. Stephen Sullivan and Jean Rabe. Popcorn Press, 2007.
- “Siren Song.” Blue Kingdoms: Buxom Buccaneers. Ed. Stephen Sullivan and Jean Rabe. Walkabout Press, 2008.
- “Ravenswake” Blue Kingdoms: Shades and Specters. Eds. Stephen Sullivan and Jean Rabe. Walkabout Press, 2008.
