= King's Quest IV =

1988 video game

King's Quest IV: The Perils of Rosella
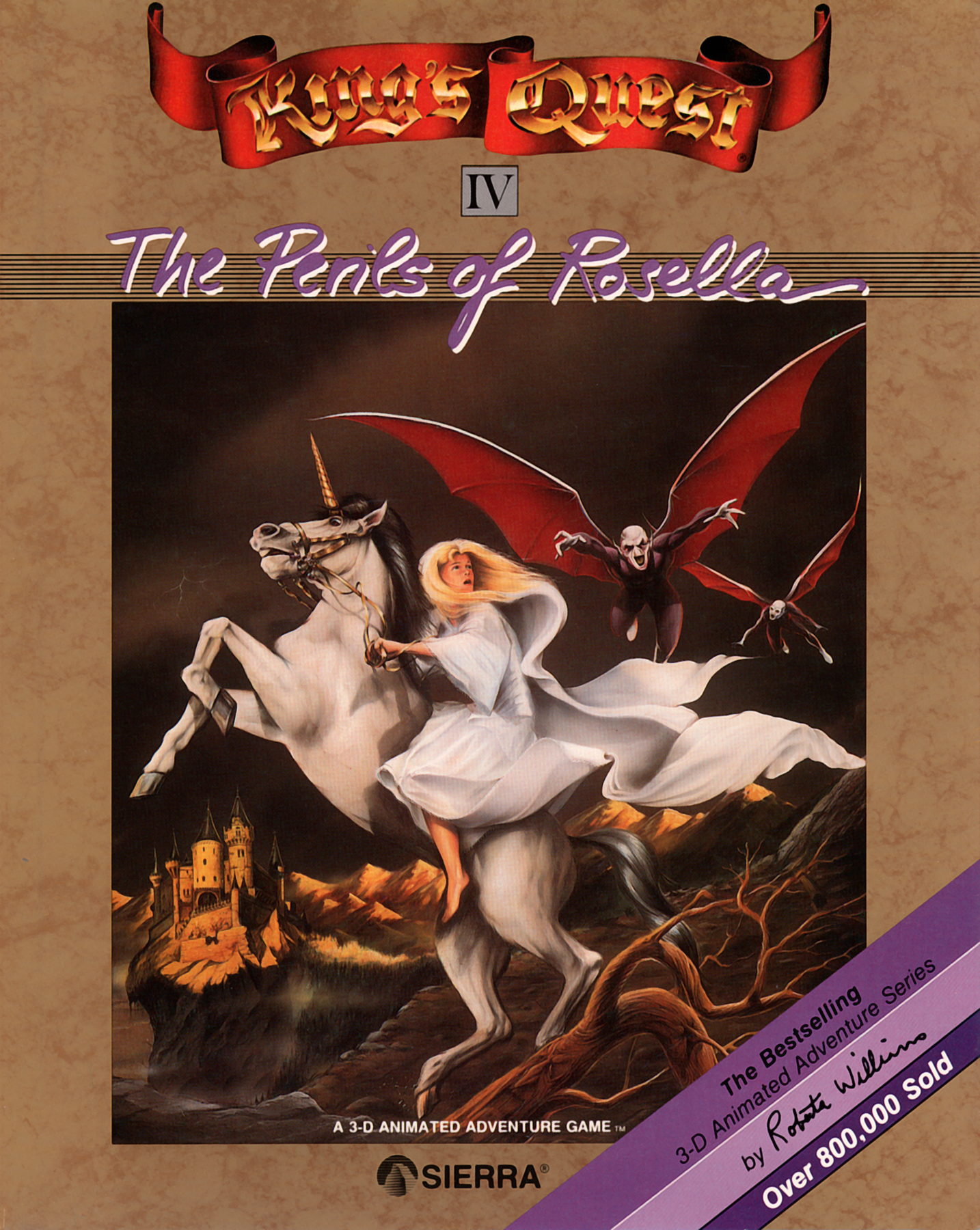
- Developer: Sierra On-Line
- Publisher: Sierra On-Line
- Designer: Roberta Williams
- Writer: Roberta Williams
- Composer: William Goldstein
- Series: King's Quest
- Engine: Sierra Creative Interpreter; Adventure Game Interpreter
- Platforms: MS-DOS, Amiga, Apple II, Apple IIGS, Atari ST
- Release: September 1988
- Genre: Adventure
- Mode: Single-player

King's Quest IV: The Perils of Rosella is an adventure game developed by Sierra On-Line and published originally for PCs and home computers in 1988 as the fourth entry in the King's Quest series. The game follows Rosella, princess of Daventry, as she journeys through the pseudo-medieval fairy tale-inspired fantasy realm of Tamir, on a quest to find a magic fruit that can heal her father King Graham. It is presented as an interconnected set of locations, or flip-screens, with a pseudo-3D art style. The player interacts with locations and items using text commands, and must avoid numerous hazards and obstacles in their quest.

King's Quest IV was developed by Sierra using two game engines: an expanded version of the engine that was originally developed for King's Quest I (1984), the Adventure Game Interpreter, and a new engine that was capable of better animation and sound but could not run on older computers, the Sierra Creative Interpreter. It was designed by Sierra co-founder Roberta Williams as a blend of common fairy tales and fantasy tropes, and she believed that having a woman protagonist would attract female players without having an impact on the male playerbase. She added a strict in-game time limit to give players a sense of urgency in completing the quest. To showcase the sound capabilities of the new engine, Sierra hired composer William Goldstein to write 40 minutes of music for the game.

The game sold 100,000 copies in its first two weeks, and 800,000 copies within a year, a large increase over the sales of the previous three games. Critics praised the advances in graphics and animation over prior adventure games, though opinions were mixed on the gameplay, with some reviewers praising them while others found some puzzles to be obtuse or tedious. The game won "Best Adventure or Fantasy/Role-Playing Program" at the 1989 Software Publishers Association awards, and Rosella has been considered one of the first "major female protagonists" in a video game. It has been included in several compilation releases, and unofficial remakes were released in 2021 and 2025 for modern systems. The King's Quest series, which includes a further four games by Sierra, has been termed its flagship series.

== Gameplay ==

Gameplay screenshots of a conversation between Rosella and Genesta; Adventure Game Interpreter version above and Sierra Creative Interpreter version below

King's Quest IV is a single-player adventure game set in the pseudo-medieval fairy tale-inspired fantasy realm of Tamir, in which the player controls the character Rosella to find a magic fruit that can heal her father King Graham. The game world is divided into dozens of locations, or flip-screens, with one location visible at a time. These locations are presented in pseudo-3D as if viewed from the side, with the player moving Rosella around the screen in front of and behind other elements of the location.

In addition to moving Rosella, the player can interact with the objects, obstacles, and creatures within the location. This is done by entering text commands, which can be one or two words (e.g., "get stone") or more complex phrases (e.g., "use key on lock"). The allowable commands depend on where Rosella is standing in the location; for example, "get stone" only has an effect if Rosella is standing in a part of a screen where there is a stone present. Some locations have other characters which she can talk to or who may kill her. Rosella can also die from numerous hazards in the game, such as drowning or falling; upon death, the player can reload the game from the last time they saved it.

The game gives the player a time limit of 24 hours of gameplay time, which moves much faster than real time, before Rosella fails her quest. The player can view a clock in a location in-game to check the time. That day is divided into a day period and a night period, with night falling at either 9 pm or once all daytime activities are completed. Some activities must be completed during the day, while other puzzles can be solved only at night. There are also many items which can be obtained and put in the player's inventory; most are used to solve puzzles or unlock new locations.

== Plot ==
Rosella is the daughter of King Graham of Daventry, the protagonist of the first two games in the series. At the conclusion of King's Quest III, he tosses his adventurer's cap to Rosella and her brother Alexander; King's Quest IV begins immediately afterward, with King Graham suffering a heart attack and soon to die. The devastated Princess Rosella is contacted via the Magic Mirror by the good fairy Genesta in the faraway land of Tamir, who tells her of a magic fruit that can heal King Graham that Rosella can have in exchange for helping Genesta. Rosella agrees and is teleported to the fairy kingdom of Tamir. Genesta reveals that her archenemy, the evil fairy Lolotte, has stolen her talisman, without which Genesta will die in twenty-four hours. Additionally, without the talisman, Genesta lacks the power to return Rosella to Daventry. Rosella agrees to undertake a quest for both the talisman and the magic fruit and ventures out, dressed as a peasant girl.

Rosella navigates the realm, interacting with mythical creatures such as dwarves, an ogre, and Cupid, and finds the fruit before night falls, but is then captured and imprisoned in Lolotte's castle. She demands that Rosella obtain three things for her to increase her evil power and influence in return for being freed: a unicorn, a hen that lays golden eggs, and Pandora's box. Once Rosella finds the three within Tamir and brings them to the castle, Lolotte announces that her hideous and deformed son Edgar has fallen in love with Rosella and she intends for them to marry, trapping Rosella and condemning King Graham and Genesta to death. A sympathetic Edgar, however, helps Rosella escape and she slays Lolotte with Cupid's bow.

Rosella recovers the talisman and returns to Genesta, saving her life. As a reward for his help and kindness, Genesta transforms Edgar into a handsome young man. Rosella rejects Edgar's marriage proposal, although she expresses hope that they will meet again someday. She is then teleported back to Daventry where the fruit heals King Graham, much to the joy of his family. The game additionally has two alternate endings: if Rosella is caught after Edgar helps her escape but before slaying Lolotte, she is forced to marry him; and if she does not have the fruit upon returning to Daventry, Graham dies.

== Development ==
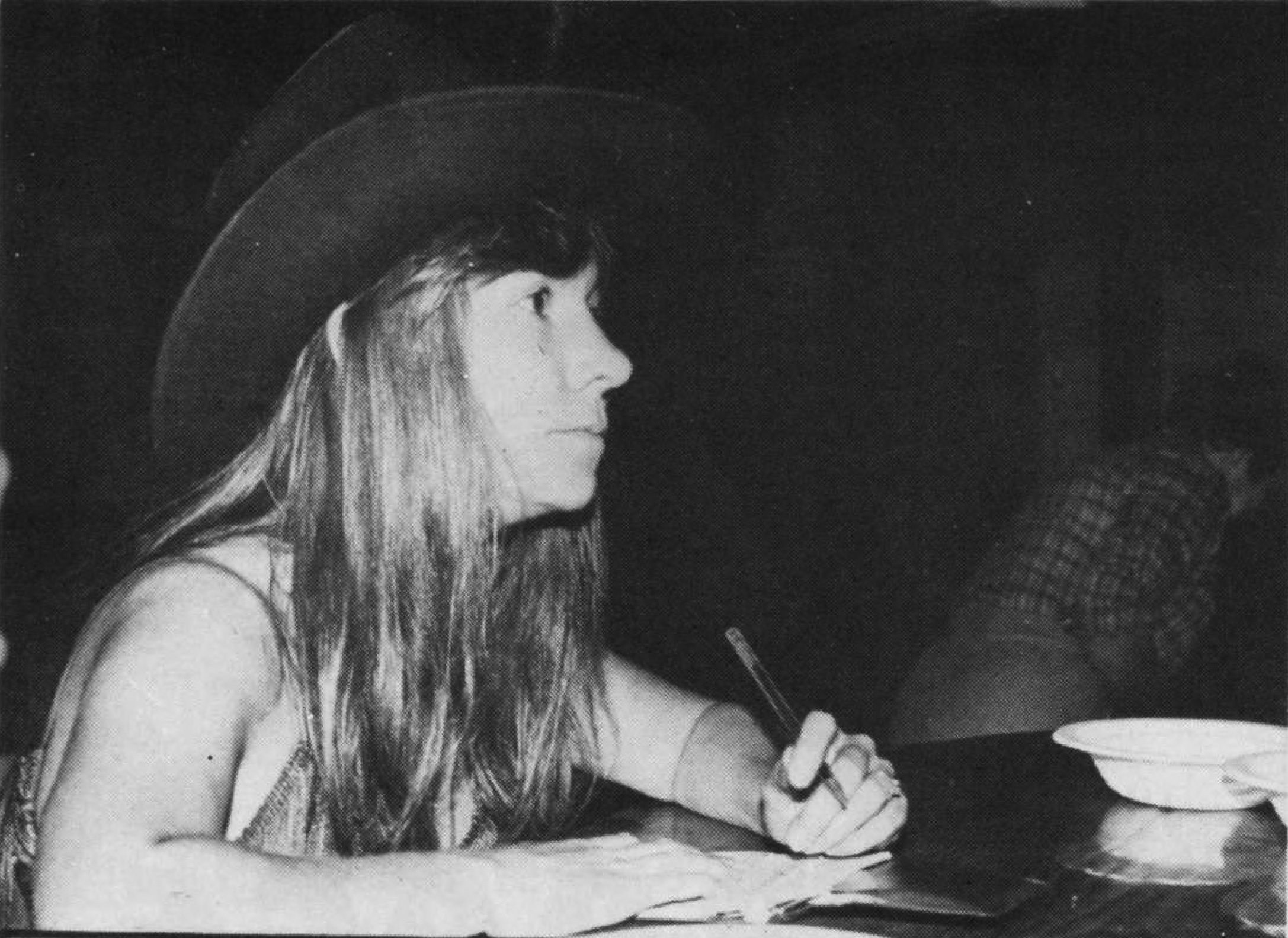
Roberta Williams in 1981

Sierra On-Line was founded in 1979 by Roberta and Ken Williams as On-Line Systems, and in 1984 released King's Quest, later termed King's Quest I, with Roberta Williams as designer alongside a team of six programmers and artists. She made the game world as a blend of common fairy tales that could be directly experienced as a game. During the development of King's Quest I, Sierra developed an engine for the game to interpret and react to player inputs called the Adventure Game Interpreter (AGI) which could be reused for later titles. Sierra followed the game with King's Quest II in 1985 and King's Quest III in 1986, both using the AGI engine, and after their release began working on a fourth title in the series.

King's Quest IV was designed by Roberta Williams, and developed by a team of 13 programmers and artists. As part of creating the game, Sierra developed a new adventure game engine, the Sierra Creative Interpreter (SCI). The new engine allowed for higher quality animation and higher-resolution graphics, and additionally added support for sound cards which could provide more realistic sound effects and music. King's Quest IV was one of the first games to support sound cards, and Sierra ran sales promotion campaigns to encourage players to buy them and became a reseller of both Ad Lib and Roland sound cards. The enhanced features of the SCI engine meant that it could not run on older computers, so Sierra also produced an AGI version of the game which they sold directly rather than through retail stores.

Sierra stated in 2015 that the core elements of a King's Quest game were family-friendly humor, fairy tale themes, cute characters, a clear story, and non-violent solutions to problems. Williams, in designing the game, included Rosella as a female protagonist partly as a representation of herself and partly to attract female players. In order to not surprise players used to male protagonists, she included Rosella in the ending of King's Quest III, and discussed her as being the protagonist in interviews during development. There was some concern within Sierra that a woman protagonist would reduce sales to male players, which made up the majority of the series's audience, but responses from test audiences supported Williams's belief that men and boys would be more interested in the gameplay than the gender of the protagonist.

The development process began with Williams drafting the story and puzzles of the game on paper, before the other developers then implemented that design. The artists then began by drawing the elements for each of the locations in the game; these backgrounds were saved as a set of drawing instructions, rather than images, to save space. The artist then selected lines or areas and set their priority, or how far in the foreground or background they are. The one-day time cycle was added by Williams to give players a sense of urgency in completing the quest; she later said that during development, players who had heard rumors that King Graham would die in the game wrote in to express concern, and she wanted to use that emotion. Additionally, she liked the unsettling feeling it gave her to see the nighttime versions of the game locations. To use the sound capabilities of the SCI engine, composer William Goldstein was hired to write 75 pieces of music for the game, totaling 40 minutes.

Sierra announced the game in February 1988 as part of their planned releases for the year, and demoed it at the summer Consumer Electronics Show in June. It was released for MS-DOS in September 1988, and for Amiga, Apple II, and Atari ST computers the following year.

== Reception ==
Reception

Review scores
Publication	Score
Amiga Action	79%
Amiga Computing	81%
Commodore User	85%
Computer and Video Games	91%
The Games Machine (Italy)	90%
Zzap!64	76%
Datormagazin	9/10

King's Quest IV sold 100,000 copies in its first two weeks. It was still in the top ten best-selling games of the month for the Babbage's and Software Etc. retail chains the following May, and remained in Babbage's top 10 list through the end of the year. In early 1993, the Software Publishers Association certified it as having sold over 250,000 units, and by November 2000, sales in the United States alone had reached between 300,000 and 400,000 units. Another source reported that the game had sold 800,000 copies worldwide within a year. In August 1989, almost a year after release, it was reported that 35 to 40% of players were women.

Reviews of the game were generally positive, though opinions were mixed on the difficulty of the puzzles. Alex Simmons, Andy Mitchell, and Steve Kennedy of Amiga Action praised the "involving and varied gameplay" and said that the puzzles were not too hard, while the reviewer for Zzap!64 said that the puzzles were fun but too easy. Paul Rigby of Amiga Computing and Scorpia of Computer Gaming World, however, felt that the puzzles were mixed, with some "rather clever" while other segments were tedious; both reviewers noted the sections of the game involving climbing as being mechanically frustrating. The reviewer for Commodore User additionally found some of the puzzles to be baffling, without any in-game hints as to how to solve them. Keith Campbell of Computer + Video Games and the reviewer for The Games Machine both concluded that, in part due to its scope and complexity, King's Quest IV was the best adventure game Sierra had yet produced.

The graphics were highly praised by reviewers, and rated highly compared to previous King's Quest games as well as other games; Amiga Action, Commodore User, and Dany Boolauck of Tilt all said it had the best graphics of any King's Quest or Sierra game to date, while David Stanton of Compute! said it set a standard for the industry as a whole. Computer Gaming World, Amiga Computing, Computer + Video Games, and Zzap!64 all praised the graphics, especially the quality of the animation and colorful drawings, while Pla Wester of Datormagazin said it was like playing a fairy tale and Tilt said the game felt like being "immersed" in an animated cartoon. Computer Gaming World, Amiga Computing, and Zzap!64, however, all noted instances where the player was forced to wait too long for animations to complete. The music drew mixed reviews; Zzap!64 was sharply negative towards it and The Games Machine termed it "a sonic mess" and "a chaotic jumble of forty-eight other tracks layered on top of one another", especially in the game's introduction, while Amiga Computing and Commodore User praised it, Computer Gaming World called it "surprisingly good", and Compute! said it was "an outstanding soundtrack for those fortunate enough to own the proper equipment".

== Legacy ==
GameSpot claimed that King's Quest IV "marked a dramatic increase in the series' commercial success". The first three King's Quest games collectively had sold over 500,000 copies between 1984 and 1987. According to Sierra On-Line, combined sales of the King's Quest series surpassed 3.8 million units by the end of March 1996. The game won "Best Adventure or Fantasy/Role-Playing Program" at the Software Publishers Association awards in 1989. Roberta Williams and others have claimed that Rosella was one of the first "major female protagonists" in a video game or the "leading woman in adventure gaming". In 1994, upon the release of King's Quest VII, Williams said that IV had been her favorite game in the series.

The King's Quest series, which has been described as Sierra's "flagship series", includes a further four games by Sierra, beginning with King's Quest V in 1990 and concluding with King's Quest: Mask of Eternity in 1998. King's Quest IV has been released in several collections of games in the series in the 1990s and 2000s. It is also included in the modern King's Quest Collection on Steam and the King's Quest 4+5+6 collection released on GOG. In 1988, Silicon Valley Books published The King's Quest Companion, a combination hint guide and novelization by Peter Spear of the games in the series. Updated editions were released through 1997 as further games were released in the series. An unofficial remake of the game was released in 2021 as King's Quest IV: The Perils of Rosella Retold, adding a point-and-click control system from later King's Quest games wherein the player selects preset verbs, represented by pictures, and then selects the subject, rather than typing. An updated version by Magic Quest Entertainment in 2025 added high-resolution full color graphics and voice acting.

== Sources ==
- Cassell, Justine; Jenkins, Henry (2000). From Barbie to Mortal Kombat: Gender and Computer Games. MIT Press. ISBN 0-262-53168-2.
- Mills, Shawn (2020). The Sierra Adventure: The Story of Sierra On-Line. ISBN 978-1-71675-872-0.
- Spear, Peter (1997). The King's Quest Companion (4th ed.). Osborne/McGraw-Hill. ISBN 978-0-07-882401-2.
- Trivette, Donald B. (1988). The Official Book of King's Quest: Daventry and Beyond (PDF) (1st ed.). Compute! Books. ISBN 0-87455-155-2.
- Trivette, Donald B. (1991). The Official Book of King's Quest: Daventry and Beyond (PDF) (2nd ed.). Compute! Books. ISBN 0-87455-245-1.
