= Pepper's Adventures in Time =

1993 educational video game

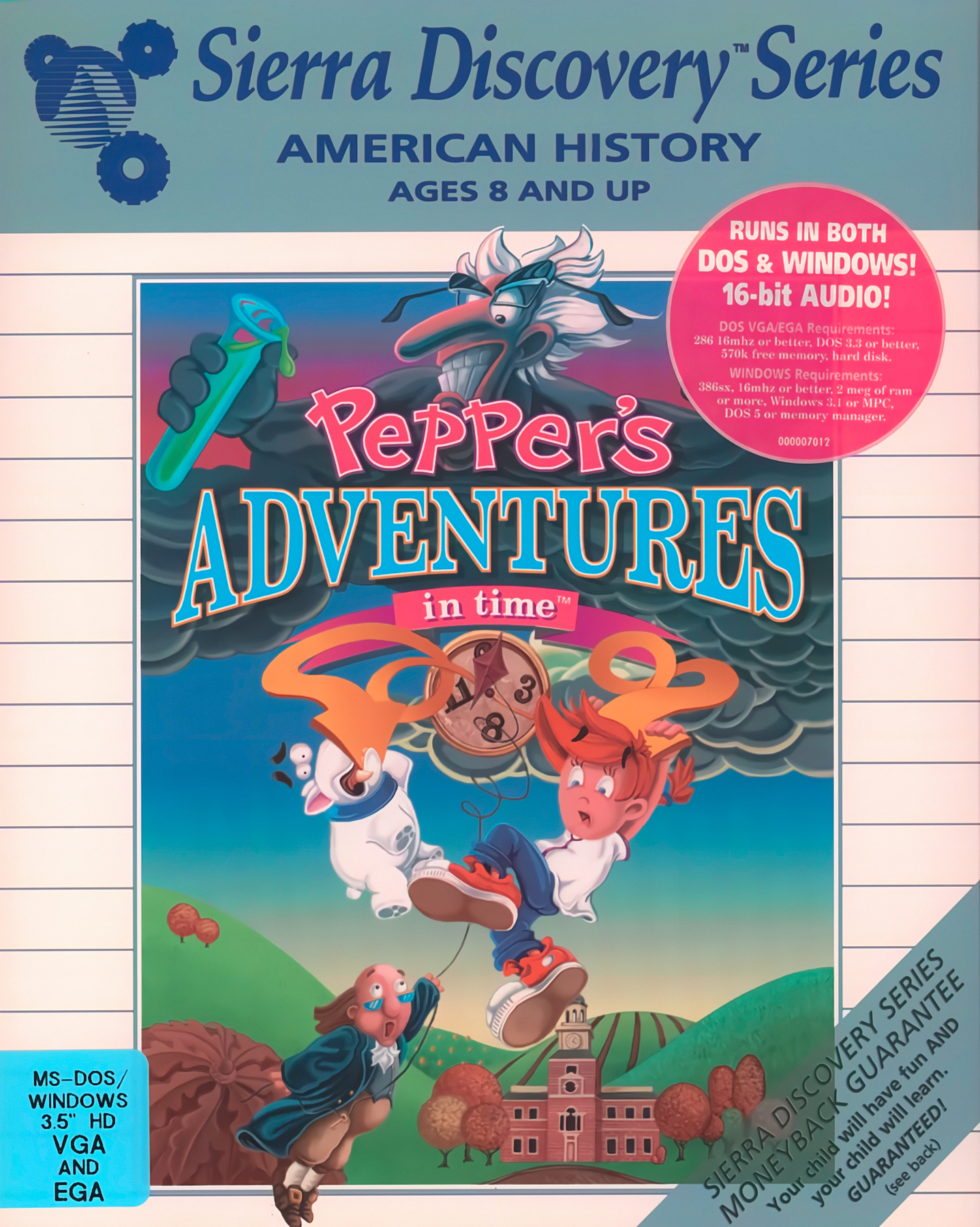
- Developer: Sierra On-Line
- Publisher: Sierra On-Line
- Producer: Mark Seibert
- Designers: Gano Haine; Jane Jensen; Josh Mandel; Lorelei Shannon; Bill Davis
- Programmer: Juan Carlos Escobar
- Artists: James Larsen; Tony Margioni
- Writer: Lorelei Shannon
- Composer: Neal Grandstaff
- Platforms: MS-DOS, Windows
- Release: NA: 1993
- Genres: Adventure, educational
- Mode: Single-player

Pepper's Adventures in Time is an educational adventure game released in 1993 by Sierra On-Line. The project was based on a concept by Sierra VP of Development/Creative Director, Bill Davis, who also designed the game's main characters. This was intended to be the first in a series of edutainment games in which the player, as Pepper, traveled back in time to set right mixed-up situations surrounding famous individuals.

It is the third game in the Sierra's Discovery Series, after two EcoQuest games.

== Plot and gameplay ==
The game chronicles a young girl, who may be considered a tomboy, named Pepper, and her pit bull dog Lockjaw. Pepper's evil Uncle Fred has created a time machine, whose portal Lockjaw is accidentally tossed into. Hoping to save her dog, Pepper is pulled in with him. Now separated, they have both been sent back to Philadelphia in 1764. Time has been altered, however; many elements of the 1960s American counterculture are combined with the life and times of Benjamin Franklin. Through generous use of artistic licence, he has been transformed into a "flower child", or "hippie". Via humorous dialogue and interaction with both the townspeople and Franklin, Pepper is responsible for ensuring that history unfolds the way it should, as well as first locating and subsequently reuniting with Lockjaw.

The player does have the opportunity to learn valid historical facts throughout the game; this is facilitated by a "truth" icon and multiple-choice quizzes at the conclusion of each act, or section of the game.

== Development ==
The game's working title was "Twisty History".

== Reception ==
Adventure Gamers gave the game 4.5 stars, praising aspects like its unpredictable plot and clever writing. Hardcore Gaming 101 deemed it one of Sierra's most creative titles in the adventure game genre, striking the right balance between education and entertainment. Metzomagic thought the game was hilarious, but felt the humour was too sophisticated for its target audience, due to references to things like Monty Python and academia. Dorkly listed the game as one of 6 Educational Games That Actually Weren't That Bad, praising the dialogue and character design. Kokatu noted the intertextuality of this game and Day of the Tentacle (released the same year) both having the player help Benjamin Franklin complete his kite experiment. The book Debugging Game History: A Critical Lexicon likened the game's animation and puzzles to those of Gabriel Knight: Sins of the Fathers, while noting that the edutainment aspirations of the game (let down by the "jarring" quizzes at the end of each segment) are not as high as similar efforts by LucasArts. Science Fiction Video Games thought the game was "gently amusing", and targeted towards more adult adventure game players than other Sierra adventure games. Every Family's Guide to Computers asserts that the game teachers through a "learning by contrast" technique in which an incomplete historical scenario is presented, which the player has to correct thereby realigning the historical facts.

In 2011, Adventure Gamers named Pepper's Adventures in Time the 67th-best adventure game ever released.
