= The King's Quest Companion =

Book by Peter Spear

- 4th edition cover
- Author: Peter Spear
- Language: English
- Subject: King's Quest series
- Genre: Strategy guide, Video game novel
- Published: 1988–1997
- Publisher: Silicon Valley Books (1st–3rd editions); Osborne/McGraw-Hill (4th edition)
- Publication place: United States
- Media type: Print
- ISBN: 978-0-07-882401-2 4th edition

The King's Quest Companion is a book by Peter Spear that serves as both a hint book/walkthrough and a complete novelization of each of the games in the King's Quest series by the original Sierra On-Line company. Silicon Valley Books published the first three editions, and the fourth edition by Osborne/McGraw-Hill. The novelization for KQ6 was written by a guest writer, eluki bes shahar.

Roberta Williams had some influence (though how much is unknown) and praised the books, as well as supplied the author with information about the games' stories.

"The King's Quest Companion is an interesting blend of fiction and helpful information for playing my games. Anyone interested in reading the story behind King's Quest or who needs to be "unstuck" while playing the game will find this book invaluable."

== Background ==
The first edition covered the first four games, and each new edition added the most recent game. The fourth and last edition covered up to the seventh game in the series.

The walkthrough novelizations are written from the point of view of various fictional narrators, such as Derek Karlavaegen, who was also used in the manual for King's Quest 6, as well as other characters mentioned in the games or manuals. These characters serve to provide the hints in narrative form. The first two editions also included an encyclopedia, "An Encyclopedia of Daventry" giving expanded details on various subjects related to the games. The idea is that these articles (the "novels") were sent from another universe via a device called the "Eye Between the Worlds".

== Description ==
In The King's Quest Companion, Spear claims that the World of Daventry exists in a different plane of reality. The creatures of magic and mythology withdrew to this other world to protect their existence as science and technology took over in our world.

Spear says he gets his information from Derek Karlavaegen, a scribe from the World of Daventry. After Karlavaegen interviewed Prince Alexander about his escape from the wizard Manannan, he traveled to Llewdor and took up shop in Manannan's house. It was here that he discovered "The Eye Between the Worlds", a device that allows him to communicate with other dimensions. It is through this that he has supposedly sent messages to Spear, including the story versions of King Graham and his family's adventures from the King's Quest games.

Spear even suggests that the Eye can be seen in the actual King's Quest III game, pointing out an object on the bookshelf in Manannan's study that looks like a computer screen.

== Novelizations ==
- King's Quest I, written by an unnamed scribe of Daventry
- King's Quest II, written by prime minister Gerwain (from the KQ2 manual)
- King's Quest III, written as an interview between Derek Karlavaegan and Alexander-Gwydion
- King's Quest IV, written by Queen Valanice
- King's Quest V, written by Derek Karlavaegan, transcribing King Graham's account
- King's Quest VI, written by Derek Karlavaegan, transcribing Alexander's account
- King's Quest VII, written by an unknown author

== Other articles ==
- Read Me First: Peter Spear discusses how the book is more than just a hint book. It is both a solution book and a history book.
- Introduction: Peter Spear discusses how he first learned about King's Quest and how he first began receiving messages from Derek Karlavaegen. He discusses scientific theories concerning parallel dimensions and how Daventry is one of these 'pocket universes'. It also contains details about how he connected with Roberta Williams and came about publishing the book.
- The Eye Between the Worlds: Derek discusses how he communicates between the worlds, and discusses the 'great dreamer' ("Roberta Williams"), and how she is influencing his world.
- The World of Daventry: Derek discusses the geography of the world of Daventry. This includes a world map and discusses how the world is constantly changing (there are three versions of the world map in the first three editions, which are used as evidence for his theory).
- A Magical Primer: A treatise by Alexander of Daventry discussing magic in the world, and his experiences using the magic in The Sorcery of Old (the spell book in KQ3). Alexander reprinted documents called "Fragments of the Sorcery of Old" by an unknown author, which discuss spells from the book. This section is actually a reprinting of all the KQ3 spells in the manual (including the page numbers) with additional backstory for each spell.
- Grave Matters: Contains the article, "Ten Days in Tamir" from the Telltale Traveler section in Bruce Banner, a newspaper from the town of Port Bruce in the land of Llewdor. It discusses travel in the land of Tamir, the haunted mansion ('Whateley Manor'), and the graveyards. A large section is a transcription of all or most of the gravestones seen in KQ4.
- Iconomancy: A Magic Without Words: Another treatise by Alexander of Daventry on magic. He discusses the magic of Iconamancy and his return journey to visit Mordack's Island to research "The Objurgation of Souls" (the spellbook his father used in KQ5).
- From the Land of Green Isles: A confession and Apologia: A letter by Derek Karlavaegen confessing and apologizing for hiding and denying personal knowledge of the Land of the Green Isles in previous maps and material he sent over from the world of Daventry. He discusses more of how he ended up on the island, how he met the king and queen, and how he ultimately made it off the islands. This is somewhat of a companion to the Guidebook to the Land of the Green Isles that was included with KQ6. The second part of the chapter, "An Editor's Note", is a letter by Peter Spear discussing how he usually works with Roberta Williams when writing the chapters in the Companion. He also discusses how Derek began to contact others, including eluki bes shahar and Jane Jensen. He discusses how eluki had given some of the communications from Derek (a transcript of the events of KQ6). He learns that Jane Jensen had received a copy of the Guidebook. Soon after, he receives copies of both directly from Derek on his own computer (confirming the validity of the documents in his mind). He discusses that Jane Jensen had decided to include an edited copy of the guidebook with KQ6.
- From the Eye Between the Worlds: The first part is an editorial by Peter Spear, discussing his difficulty in suspending his own disbelief about the veracity of the documents he has been receiving. He discusses a more recent material he received from Derek concerning the events of KQ7. The second half is a letter by Derek discussing rumors of an impending marriage between Rosella and Edgar, as well as stories he has been hearing about Valanice and Rosella's journey to the world of Eldritch. He wonders if the document written by an unknown author is just tabloid material. He makes note that the Royal Family has not told him the story firsthand, and he is somewhat skeptical about whether it's really true. But he believes if it is true, that another 'great dreamer' (like Roberta Williams) lives in his world dreaming about the other world's version of his world, then shaping his world with his own dreams.
- The Easy Way Out: This section is split into several parts. It is primarily intended as a standard, step-by-step solution guide for the KQ games. The first part is Peter Spear discussing the differences between 'reality' and the version of the world portrayed in the games, and more of his questions on the veracity of the messages he has received. He also includes his 12 Rules for Computer Games and a copy of Graham's Rules for Adventuring. Each chapter relates to a separate game, beginning with an overview of the game, and how it relates to "stories" Derek sent him, before going into step-by-step walkthrough. In the first two editions some of this section, the item/point lists was included in the chapter, "The Final Score".
- An Encyclopedia of Daventry: A section in the first two editions, which includes a glossary and back stories for many topics within the world of Daventry. From abominable snowmen to zombies.

== Sierra involvement ==
The King's Quest Companion is an official guide created in part through the help and input by many Sierra employees, and, as such, is referenced by some of the later material produced by Sierra.

Roberta Williams is acknowledged for being of help in writing the books. According to Peter Spear, he would call Roberta Williams to develop chapters for the book. If she weren't around or were too busy, he would contact other colleagues working on the games, including Jane Jensen. The books were officially endorsed by Roberta Williams, and she believed it brought the games to life in an exciting new way. She said it added another fascinating dimension to the entire King's Quest experience. She felt it was a pleasure to read, and a must-have for anyone wanting to explore the series in greater depth and detail. (Note: "...a wonderful blend of fact and fiction that brings my games to life in an exciting new way. It adds another fascinating dimension to the entire King's Quest experience. It is truly a pleasure to read and a must-have for anyone hoping to explore the series in greater depth and detail." – Roberta Williams) She provided Peter Spear with encouragement, support, and access to work in progress.

Ken Williams (the former owner of Sierra On-line) supported the book from day one. He and his brother, John Williams, were extremely helpful and supportive of the book through the years, and without their support, the book might not have existed. Peter Spear worked directly with Jane Jensen while editing and writing material for KQ6 portions (the main novelization was written by the professional novelist eluki bes shahar), and he worked with Lorelei Shannon on the material published in the 4th Edition and King's Quest VII: Authorized Guide. Other people at Sierra who assisted with Peter Spear in developing the book through the years include Bill Davis, Dennis Jonathan, Kirk Green, Anita Greene, Liz Jacobs, Mark Seibert, Marc Hudgins, Jonk Meek, Dan Rogers, Jerry Bowerman, and Joe Escalle.

The author directly worked with designers and the game publisher to receive behind the scenes information, and influenced material in the games (About King's Quest I–V), the manuals and even other official Hint Books on occasion (see KQ6 and KQ7 hintbooks by Lorelei Shannon, KQ5 Manual (computer and NES versions), the Guidebook to the Land of the Green Isles, KQ6 itself, and King's Questions (a computer game), and other material in the King's Quest Collection (15th Anniversary Collector's Edition) (The Royal Scribe). Sierra's Interaction Magazine, and King's Quest Collection reprinted portions of the book on occasion to advertise them, give background story to the King's Quest World, and give hints to players (Sierra Magazine, Autumn 1989, Interaction, Fall 1994). The former article was included in the Inside the Chest archive and in several editions of the King's Quest Collection.

== Reception ==
The editors of Computer Gaming World reviewed the book and stated that "A final comment on the book itself must be that The King's Quest Companion is more than a hint book and more than a reference work, it is... well, a companion. We suggest that readers will get even more out of the fine adventure series if they play the games (or replay them) with this book beside them."

Reviewers described the book's narrative approach as a departure from typical hint books. Page 6 noted that Spear "skilfully weaves and elaborates on Roberta Williams' stories about the world of Daventry, transforming a mere clue book into an entertaining story." Zero praised the "semi-fiction format" and described the book as "well-written and fascinating" with humor throughout.

Both reviews commented on the book's dual structure. Page 6 wrote that, with the narrative format, unlike standard walkthroughs, "there is little chance of unintentionally reading more than you need to know and spoiling the fun," while Zero described how readers could choose between the "semi-fiction method" narratives and the more direct "Easy Way Out" section.

Both also praised the encyclopedia: Page 6 found "An Encyclopedia of Daventry" the "most intriguing" section for quick reference, and Zero noted its humorous presentation of Daventry's people and items. Page 6 said the book would be their preferred choice among King's Quest hint books, and Zero called it "a must for any King's Quest fan." Zero's one criticism was the book's physical size, joking that readers would "need a fork-lift truck to pick the thing up."
