= The Colonel's Bequest =

1989 video game by Roberta Williams

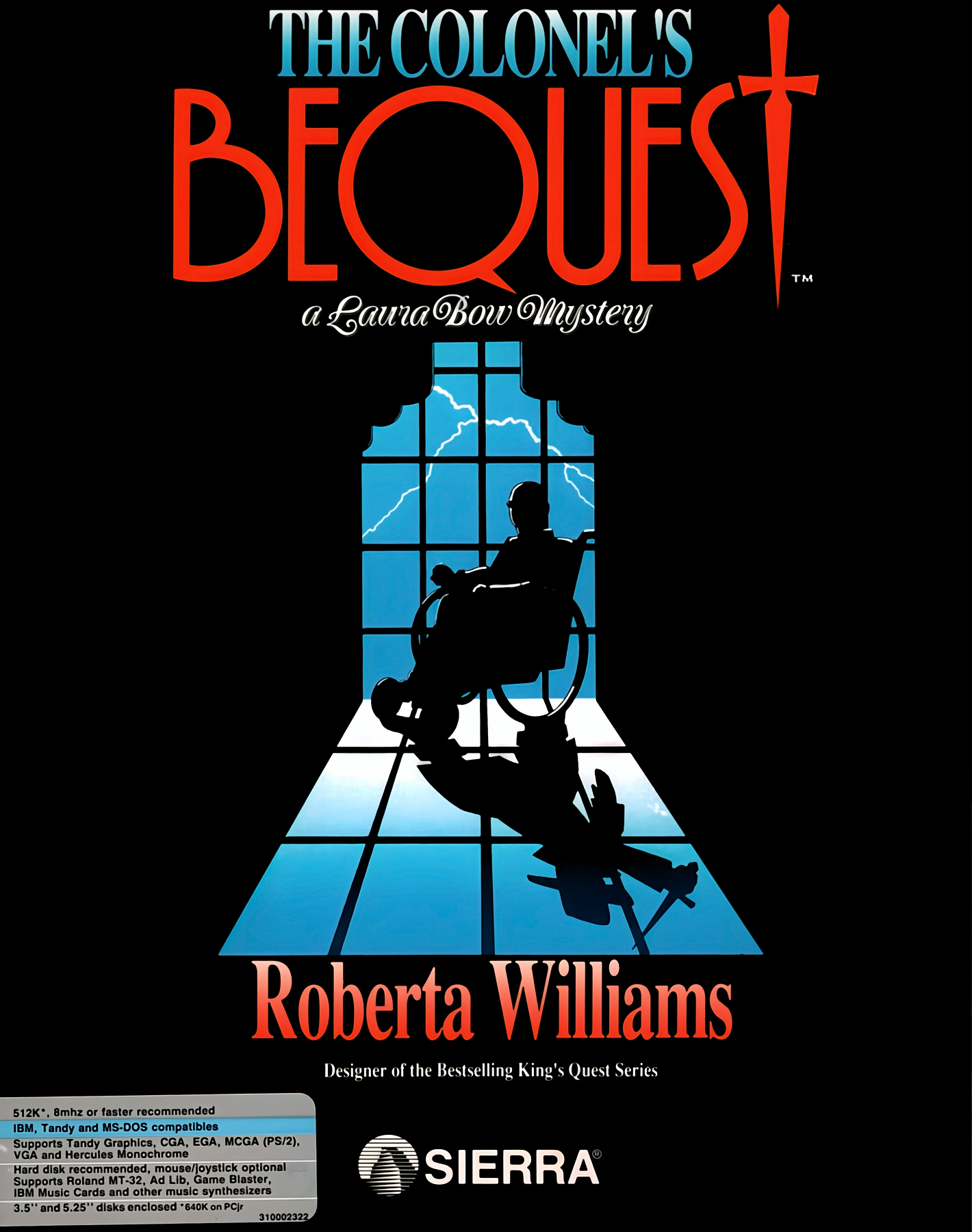
- Developer: Sierra On-Line
- Publisher: Sierra On-Line
- Directors: Roberta Williams; Chris Iden
- Producer: Ken Williams
- Designer: Jacqueline Austin
- Programmers: Chris Hoyt; Chris Iden
- Artists: Douglas Herring; Gerald Moore
- Writer: Roberta Williams
- Composer: Ken Allen
- Engine: SCI0
- Platforms: MS-DOS; Amiga; Atari ST
- Release: October 1989 (MS-DOS); 1990 (Amiga, ST)
- Genre: Adventure
- Mode: Single-player

The Colonel's Bequest is a character-driven graphic adventure game by Sierra On-Line featuring the character of Laura Bow. It was released for MS-DOS in 1989. Ports for Amiga and Atari ST were released in 1990. It was the first of the short-lived Laura Bow Mysteries series created by Roberta Williams, which used many elements from the game Mystery House. Its sequel The Dagger of Amon Ra was released in 1992.

== Gameplay ==
The Colonel's Bequest uses Sierra's Creative Interpreter (SCI), providing 320x200 16-color EGA graphics and supports a variety of sound hardware, including AdLib, Sound Blaster, and Roland MT-32. Along with King's Quest IV, the game was one of Sierra's last to use a text parser, before their transition to VGA graphics and point and click gameplay.

Laura Bow in the mansion's bathroom. The game uses 16-color EGA graphics (MS-DOS version).

This was also one of the few Sierra adventure games to focus more on the characters than puzzles. Although solving puzzles is required to obtain a high score, it is possible to discover information about the characters' backgrounds and relationships with each other. Regardless of the importance of these elements, it is possible to finish the game without solving any puzzles, discovering many vital details about the characters, or even identifying the murderer.

Although some actions are recorded and scored at the end of the game, there is no discernible point system in place. To aid the player in achieving a higher score during their next attempt, upon completion of the game, it reveals hints and information about things that were missed. This implies that the game is intended to be replayed.

The game's characters make plans to be in specific locations at certain times, allowing the player to follow them. Characters may become annoyed with the protagonist, Laura Bow, if they catch her snooping on them or asking too many questions. However, this is only apparent in dialogue, and the plot is not significantly affected.

Death lurks around every corner, but the mysterious villain almost never threatens Laura because she is not related to the Dijon family. Staying consistent with other Sierra adventure games, most deaths experienced by the player occur by accident or misadventure, such as falling off a balcony or being crushed by a falling chandelier. However, the player may be killed by the murderer in the later phases of the game. For example, the murderer's arm reaches out at specific locations and snatches Laura away. In another case, the murderer appears in the darkness and strangles Laura to death. One of the more notable non-accidental deaths occurs when the player simply attempts to shower: the murderer stabs Laura in a reference to the Alfred Hitchcock film Psycho.

The game's unusual title can be attributed to Sierra's long-standing tradition of including "Quest" in the title of nearly every graphical adventure it published. A bequest is a legacy or gift handed down to someone in a will.

== Plot ==
The Colonel's Bequest is set in 1925. The game's main character is Laura Bow, a Tulane University student, daughter of a detective, and an aspiring journalist. Laura is invited by her flapper friend, Lillian, to spend a weekend at the decaying sugar plantation of Colonel Dijon. When the reclusive and childless Colonel gathers his quarrelsome relatives for a reading of his will, tensions explode, and the bickering leads to murder.

Throughout the game, Laura remains stranded on the island, surrounded by suspects and potential victims in a classical Agatha Christie manner. Laura's task is to learn the family secrets and ultimately, the identity of the murderer. There is also an optional subplot concerning a hidden treasure. The storyline advances by a quarter-hour when new plot elements are witnessed, with a new act beginning every hour. Sometimes a quarter-hour can advance in a few real-time seconds, if Laura happens to be at the proper place.

In the final act, Laura finds a skeleton key on Lillian's body. She can use this to open the attic door and discover Colonel Dijon and Rudy struggling over a hypodermic syringe. The ending depends on Laura's final actions. If she shoots the Colonel or lets Rudy win the fight, the Colonel will die, and Rudy will claim that his uncle was the sole murderer. Laura returns home but questions whether that was the whole story. If Laura instead shoots and wounds Rudy, the Colonel will reveal that Lillian was the primary murderer, but was killed by Rudy. Colonel Dijon then changes his will to leave everything to Celie, and will let Laura keep the hidden treasure if it is discovered.

== Characters ==
As with classic murder stories, the plot revolves around the characters, most of whom are either potential victims or potential murderers. Most of the game characters are named after prominent figures of the time, such as Rudolph Valentino, W. C. Fields, Gloria Swanson, Clara Bow, Lillian Gish, and Clarence Darrow. Most are heavily based on well-used archetypes.

- Laura Bow
  Laura Bow – Player character, Tulane University student, and daughter of detective John Bow. Her name is a reference to silent film actress Clara Bow.
- Lillian Prune – Laura's friend from Tulane and Ethel's daughter. Her name derives from Lillian Gish, another actress.
- Colonel Henri Dijon – A rich and eccentric elderly recluse, veteran of the Spanish–American War, living on an Antebellum sugar plantation island. His surname references the character Colonel Mustard in the board game Cluedo.
- Ethel Prune – The Colonel's younger sister and Lillian's alcoholic mother. Her name may be a reference to Prof. Plum, also a Cluedo character.
- Gertrude "Gertie" Dijon – The snobbish widow of the Colonel's brother, and the mother of Gloria and Rudy.
- Gloria Swansong – Gertie's daughter and Rudy's sister. An aspiring Hollywood actress facing legal and health issues. Named for actress Gloria Swanson.
- Rudolph "Rudy" Dijon – Gertie's son and Gloria's brother, a slick womanizer and gambler. Inspired by silent film actor Rudolph Valentino.
- Clarence Sparrow – Henri's sneaky lawyer and one of Gloria's previous lovers. Named after Clarence Darrow, a celebrated American lawyer.
- Dr. Wilbur C. Feels – The Colonel's long-time and questionable personal physician. His name indirectly references comedian W. C. Fields.
- Fifi – The attractive and flirtatious French maid who lives with and "serves" the Colonel (and secretly, also Jeeves).
- Jeeves – The Colonel's taciturn butler. Named after P. G. Wodehouse's famous butler Reginald "Reggie" Jeeves.
- Celie – Henri's cook, the daughter of slaves formerly owned by the Dijon plantation, and the only character to befriend Laura.

== Release ==
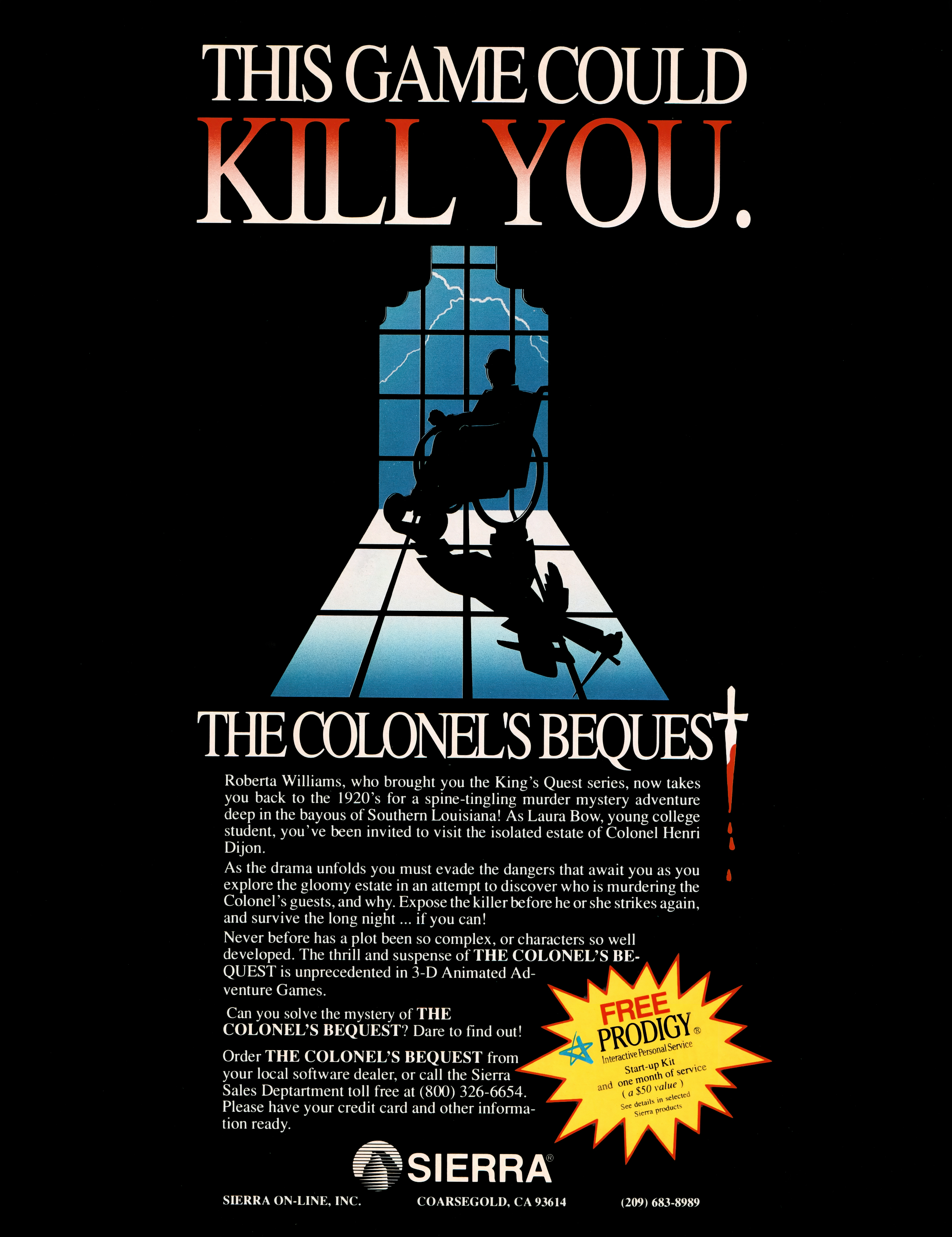
1989 magazine ad.

Originally released in 1989, the game was reissued in 1993 to supplement the release of the sequel, The Dagger of Amon Ra. This version corrects some errors with special effects (for example, the fireflies in the opening boat ride and around the dock are more visible and move less erratically). GOG.com released an emulated version for Microsoft Windows in 2017.

== Reception ==
Reception

Review scores
Publication	Score
Computer and Video Games	83%
The Games Machine	89%
The One	80%
Amiga Format	60%
CU Amiga	84%
Zzap!64	79%

Upon release, The Colonel's Bequest received positive reviews. Johnny L. Wilson from Computer Gaming World opined the game's lack of difficulty would likely disappoint "hard-core adventure gamers (i.e. inveterate puzzle-solvers)" but it succeeded as an "interactive play" that was much more story- than puzzle-driven compared to previous Sierra adventures. He praised the game's use of humor and audio, and called it a "forerunner of one style of future entertainment software".

In the May 1990 edition of Games International, Theo Clarke called the game "solid genre stuff", noting that "the theme reverts to the 'mansion murder' concept of [Roberta Williams' first program] Mystery House". He commented on the radical new approach this game takes, wherein the player has the option of not taking any action except to observe, saying: "Such an approach is not very rewarding, but it serves to demonstrate the essential difference between this and other games". Clarke concluded by giving the game an above-average rating of 8 out of 10 for both gameplay and graphics: "I have found all of the Sierra games quite obsessive but The Colonel's Bequest has a charm all of its own".

Retrospectively, Adventure Gamers' Johann Walter gave it four stars out of five and called it a "rather unique game [and] excellent game" wherein "[the game's director and writer] Roberta Williams showed (again) that she was a master game designer, writing one of the very few good detective games in this mold". Adventure Classic Gaming's Michelle Destefano wrote: "In the end, the Laura Bow Mystery series is among Roberta's best works, and The Colonel's Bequest is among the best murder mystery adventure games to date".

In 2011, Adventure Gamers named The Colonel's Bequest the 84th-best adventure game ever released.

In a lengthy 2022 retrospective, historical linguist and game enthusiast Georgiy Starostin wrote that "The Colonel’s Bequest, like almost any Roberta Williams game, is a triumph of atmosphere and style over substance," offering high praise for the atmosphere, art, and music while criticizing the puzzle system as "a classic case of Noble Intentions soiled and neutered with Dumbass Execution."

== Sequel ==
A sequel called The Dagger of Amon Ra followed in 1992, featuring the same character, Laura Bow, now a reporter in New York City investigating a series of murders one night in an Egyptian-themed museum.
