= King's Quest fan games =

There have been several King's Quest fangames both original and retellings/remakes of the original games that have been released by various developers.

== Background ==
Interactive Fantasies created two of the earliest KQ fan adventures were created while Sierra's was still producing games in the King's Quest series. In 1997, they created two overhead adventure action-RPG games set after KQ7 using Epic MegaGames' ZZT software, King's Quest ZZT and King's Quest ZZT 2. In an idea predating 1998's Mask of Eternity, the game includes weapons and enemies to fight (in a similar style to Ys series by bumping into the enemies, or manually firing arrows), and even includes a few side-scrolling platformer arcade sequences.

AGD Interactive (previously Tierra Entertainment) has released three King's Quest games so far. First, they created a more or less straight remake of King's Quest: Quest for the Crown, with advanced VGA-style graphics and a voice soundtrack, King's Quest I VGA. They moved onto create a retelling of King's Quest II: Romancing the Throne, creating an all new story inspired by the original game. In February 2011, they released King's Quest III Redux, an enhanced retelling of KQ3 (continuing ideas that first appeared in Romancing the Stones). It was not a straight remake as their KQI remake, nor was it a full overhaul like their KQII remake had been; in fact, many of the elements of the original KQIII story were left intact, but details were altered to create a more challenging experience, and the story was tweaked to incorporate elements of the KQII rewrite as progressing into KQIII.

Infamous Adventures released a remake of King's Quest III: To Heir Is Human on June 19, 2006. The release includes Video Graphics Array-style graphics and an advanced music and voice soundtrack for the game. It offers several new and extended cut scenes, a few tweaks to locations, a new ending, and a streamlined spell casting system.

Phoenix Online Studios's project is The Silver Lining. It is an episodic game series based on the King's Quest series. It is an unofficial sequel, taking place where King's Quest 8 left off. Four episodes of the game has been released so far.

Smaller developers have released assorted games set in the KQ universe as well. Steve Lingle created a text based remake of King's Quest V: Absence Makes the Heart Go Yonder. A small team known as Intermezzo Software created a followup set between KQ2 and KQ3, using Sierra's classic AGI system (requires DosBox). Finally, Joel Page created a short adventure/parody called Owl's Quest: Every Owl has it's Day starring Cedric the Owl from King's Quest V, set after KQ8.

In 2024, a fan sequel called It Takes Two to Tangle was released. It takes place after the events of the first seven games in the series, revisiting a number of familiar locations and providing resolution to some of the unanswered questions from the official series.

In some cases a few of Sierra's former employees such as Josh Mandel, Lori Ann Cole and Andy Hoyos became involved with the fan games, lending their voices to characters. In the case of King's Quest III Redux, several professional actors/actresses lent their voices to a couple of characters, including Robert Adamson.

Another notable aspect is that AGD Interactive, Phoenix Online Studios, and Infamous Adventures each received fan licenses from Activision (or previous owners of the King's Quest IP) to finish their fan remakes and games, and release them for free.

=== Mythology ===
The King's Quest fan series like their predecessors are often inspired by classical fairy tales, fantasy, classic horror, and mythology. Whereas the original series references to other works were often direct, some of the fan developers such as AGD Interactive chose to obscure the references in some way. For example, Dracula (who was directly taken from the novel of the same name) was replaced with the Count Caldaur who instead of being evil turns out to be good. Little Red Riding Hood was replaced by the character Possum/Anastasia, and Grandma became Lavidia (curiously Anastasia can be seen reading a copy of Little Red Riding Hood, further showing that she is not the classic fairy tale character). Medusa was replaced with the character Smaude, who turns out to be a cursed maiden and innocent.

=== Fan games ===
- King's Quest ZZT (1997) - by Interactive Fantasies
- King's Quest ZZT 2 (2000) - by Interactive Fantasies
- King's Quest I: Quest for the Crown (2001)/Enhanced Edition (2009), unofficial modernized VGA remake of King's Quest I SCI by AGD Interactive (formerly "Tierra Entertainment").
- King's Quest II: Romancing the Stones (2002)/Enhanced Edition (2009), also by AGD Interactive, based on King's Quest II.
- Peasant's Quest (2004) by Homestar Runner, a satirical parody of King's Quest and similar adventure games, set in the world of Peasantry.
- King's Quest 2 ¼: Breast Intentions (2005) - a game by Intermezzo Software.
- King's Quest III: To Heir Is Human (2006), by Infamous Adventures, unofficial modernized VGA remake of King's Quest III.
- King's Quest V - The Text Adventure (2007) - created by Steve Lingle, it is an unofficial text adventure remake of King's Quest V.
- Owl's Quest: Every Owl Has It's Day (2007) - by Jstudios.
- King's Quest III: To Heir Is Human (a.k.a. King's Quest III Redux) (2011), by AGDI.
- The Silver Lining (2011), by Phoenix Online Studios.
- Stair Quest (2016), comedy adventure game serving as homage to King's Quest and similar games
- King’s Quest IV: The Perils of Rosella Retold, adds a point-and-click control system from later King's Quest games. An updated version by Magic Quest Entertainment in 2025 added VGA graphics and voice acting.
- It Takes Two to Tangle (2024) by Akril15

== Game descriptions ==
=== King's Quest ZZT ===
Alexander sets out on adventure to stop Ravenlos (the evil cousin of Mordack and Manannan).

Following Rosella and Valenice's return to Castle Daventry, a big festival is held. A messenger comes to the castle, explaining to them that Ravenlos, the evil cousin of the sorcerer Manannan has conquered the island of Llewdor, and is planning to conquer Daventry. Graham was furious of the news, and asked his son Prince Alexander to defend the kingdom. Alexander was not willing to go fight against him and his army, until his father collapses sick, which changes Alexander's mind. Alexander visits the old wise gnome for a medicine for his father, and after he is healed, he sets off for the long and dangerous mission. Along the way he meets strange creatures like Centaurs, Elves and Ogres and visits many places, like the mountains of Llewdor, the island of Tamir, and the Aberian Desert.

A nod to the King's Quest ZZT games is made in The Silver Lining’s "The Four Winds" meta-fiction newsletter. This includes the events surrounding the Centaurs and the Ogres in King's Quest ZZT (and a nod towards ZZT2), with expanded material tying it into the Phoenix Online Studios' backstories for the wind Sirocco, Zephyr, and the wizard Crispin.

=== King's Quest ZZT 2 ===
While Alexander is staying in the Elven village, hostilities have shocked the country of Daventry again. The Relentless Army attacks the castle and kidnaps his parents. Alexander travels to stop invading forces and prevent the Kingdom of Dalban's plans

=== King's Quest 2 ¼: Breast Intentions ===
KQ2 ¼ takes place between KQ2 and KQ3. Valanice sets out on an adventure to find her kidnapped son, and save him from starvation. The game uses the classic AGI system. Along the way she meets the woodcutter and his wife, pirates, henchmen, Charon, Rumplestiltskin, and others.

=== King's Quest V: The Text Adventure ===
A text based re-imagining of the King's Quest V adventure. It contains an almost completely original script, with all new descriptions for the events and areas in the game.

=== Owl's Quest: Every Owl Has It's Day ===
Owl's Quest: Every Owl Has It's Day is an unofficial adventure fangame developed and released in free download format by Jstudios for Microsoft Windows on May 26, 2007. It is a short parody of the King's Quest series (specifically King's Quest V: Absence Makes the Heart Go Yonder! and the fangame The Silver Lining) starring Cedric the Owl from King's Quest V. The game is set a short while after King's Quest VIII: Mask of Eternity.

==== Plot ====
Cedric receives an invitation from King Alexander to attend a birthday ceremony in the Land of the Green Isles. Having had a curse put on him by Crispin, Cedric must attempt to make his way to Crispin and have the curse removed so he can fly to the Green Isles. Cedric explores new locations in Serenia, including Cedric's treehouse, the Inverted Tower of Repunzel, and thwarts snakes and scorpions to make his way to Crispin's house, and finally to the Green Isles. The game includes a full voice cast (minus the narrator).

==== Gameplay ====
The gameplay is similar to the interface found in King's Quest VII: The Princeless Bride. It includes a single icon interface, an inventory section, and a feature to look at items. The single cursor can be used to speak to characters or look at objects on the screen. The art style is a crude mix of KQ7 animation style, with close-up photos from KQ5 and KQ6. The background artwork is a mix of crude hand-drawn art, and images taken from KQ5 and KQ6.

The game has a total of 8 points, with not much more than ten puzzles to solve. There are a total of three ways to die in the game (killed by a scorpion, a snake, or falling into a pit).

==== Development ====
The game was developed by Joel Page using the Adventure Game Studio, created for the monthly AGS competition. It has a full voice cast except the narrator. All parts presumably done by Joel Page (as he is the single person on the credit screen). The game uses a mix of music largely taken from KQ7.

The parody aspects of the game poke fun at situations in KQ5 with mixed results. For example, Cedric encounters and can be killed by things he warned about in KQ5. He is forced to go into places, he would have told Graham to avoid in KQ5. The game makes fun of Crispin's mispronunciation and use of generic magic words (in which case he uses the 'bibbidi bobbidi boo' from Cinderella). It makes fun of Cedric's "annoying" voice and nature. It even attempts to break the fourth wall at times with Cedric conversing with the narrator.

==== Reception ====
The game was given a special two part "Let's Play" review on That Guy with the Glasses by Paw Dugan. In the videos he and his co-host kept a running timer of the total number of typographical and grammatical errors in the game's script. They also pointed out the satirical aspects of the game that make fun of Cedric, and certain over-used plot contrivances in KQ5. They poke fun at the game's bugs. The videos also show the replies from the live events audience making fun of the game. Some of the footage were used in a special on Sierra fan game development scene.

=== It Takes Two to Tangle ===
This game omits the events of King's Quest: Mask of Eternity, taking place a year after the end of King's Quest VII. The protagonists are two characters that appeared as supporting characters in the official series: Queen Cassima, who Prince Alexander marries at the end of King's Quest VI, and Prince Edgar, who Princess Rosella reunites with at the end of King's Quest VII. The gameplay alternates between them as they journey to a number of lands with the aid of two mysterious pendants of unknown origin, hoping to find out the truth about the dark visions that have been plaguing people from both of their families.

== Developers ==
- AGD Interactive (formerly Tierra Entertainment)
- Infamous Adventures
