= King's Quest II =

1985 video game

King's Quest II: Romancing the Throne
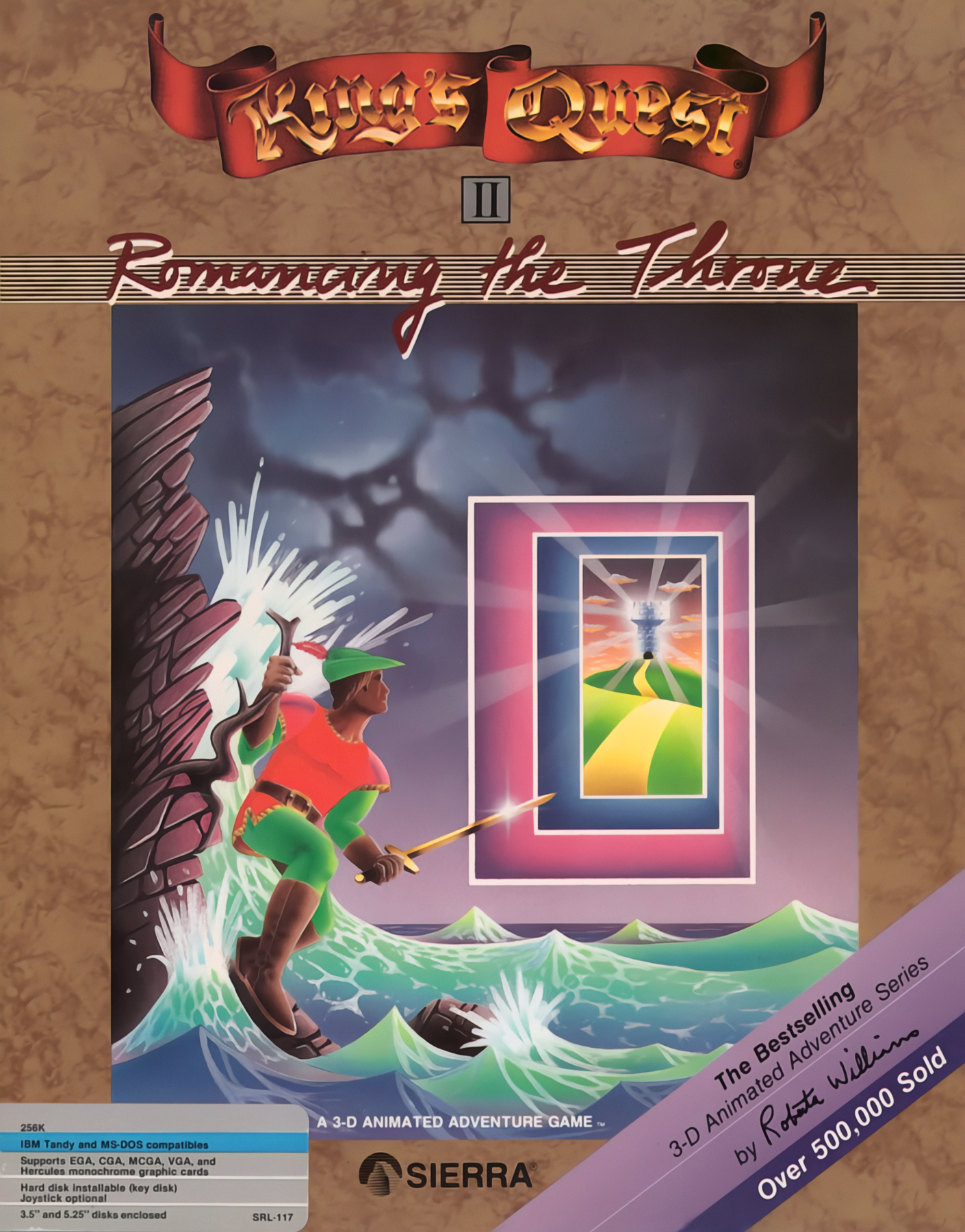
- Developer: Sierra On-Line
- Publisher: Sierra On-Line
- Designer: Roberta Williams
- Artists: Doug MacNeill; Mark Crowe
- Composer: Al Lowe
- Series: King's Quest
- Engine: Adventure Game Interpreter
- Platforms: IBM PC compatible, Macintosh, Apple II, Apple IIGS, Amiga, Atari ST, Tandy 1000
- Release: May 1985
- Genre: Adventure
- Mode: Single-player

King's Quest II: Romancing the Throne is an adventure game developed by Sierra On-Line and published originally for home computers in 1985 as the second entry in the King's Quest series. The game follows the young King Graham as he journeys through the pseudo-medieval fairy tale-inspired fantasy realm of Kolyma, on a quest to find three keys to an enchanted isle and rescue the fair maiden Valanice from the tower in which she is imprisoned. It is presented as an interconnected set of locations, or flip-screens, with a pseudo-3D art style. The player interacts with locations and items using text commands, and must avoid numerous hazards and obstacles in their quest.

King's Quest II was developed by Sierra as a continuation of King's Quest I (1984), reusing and enhancing its game engine, the Adventure Game Interpreter. The game was designed by Sierra co-founder Roberta Williams as a blend of common fairy tales and fantasy tropes, with Graham's quest to rescue a maiden setting up a family of characters that could be used in following games. Several developers of the game, including Scott Murphy, Mark Crowe, and composer Al Lowe, went on to develop future games for Sierra.

The first three King's Quest games collectively sold over 500,000 copies by 1987. Critics praised the advances in gameplay over the first game, as well as the quality and variety of graphical animations. The game has been included in several compilation releases, and an unofficial remake was released in 2002 for modern systems. The King's Quest series, which includes a further six games by Sierra, has been termed its flagship series.

== Gameplay ==
Gameplay screenshot; the player has entered "open mailbox" into the text input parser

King's Quest II is an adventure game set in the pseudo-medieval fairy tale-inspired fantasy realm of Kolyma, in which the player controls the character King Graham to complete a quest for three keys to rescue the imprisoned Valanice. The game world is divided into dozens of locations, or flip-screens, with one location visible at a time. These locations are presented in pseudo-3D as if viewed from the side, with the player moving Graham around the screen in front of and behind other elements of the location.

In addition to moving Graham, the player can interact with the objects, obstacles, and creatures within the location. This is done by entering text commands, which can be one or two words (e.g., "get stone") or more complex phrases (e.g., "use key on lock"). The allowable commands are contextual to where Graham is standing in the location; for example, "get stone" only has an effect if Graham is standing in a part of a screen where there is a stone present. Some locations have other characters which he can talk to or who may kill him. Many characters do not stay in one location, but can be found randomly in multiple places. Graham can also die from numerous hazards in the game, such as drowning or falling; upon death, the player can reload the game from the last time they saved it.

The goal of the game is to find three keys to the enchanted isle containing the tower Valanice is imprisoned in and scale it, at which point the game ends. There are additionally many items which can be obtained and put in the player's inventory, which are used to solve puzzles, unlock new locations, or prevent Graham dying from enemies. Every time a key is used on the three doors that lead to Valanice, changes are made to the game world, including new characters appearing. If the player crosses the bridge that leads to the doors too many times the bridge collapses, resulting in a game that can no longer be won. Some items solely award points, which are tracked throughout the game but have no effect otherwise. Some puzzles have multiple solutions depending on the items the player has found, and the order the player solves puzzles and finds locations is restricted only by the items they have.

== Plot ==
The game has a minimal story, mostly told through the game's manual and an introductory cutscene. One year after the conclusion of King's Quest I, in which Sir Graham retrieved the three stolen treasures of Daventry and became the new king, he sees a vision of his predecessor King Edward in a magic mirror. King Edward advises him that now that the realm was restored to prosperity, Graham needed to find a wife to ensure the future stability of the realm. Graham hosts a celebration to meet all of the eligible maidens of the land, but is not enthralled by any of them. He laments this in front of the mirror, which shows him a vision of a beautiful young woman, Valanice, in captivity on the top of an ivory crystal tower in the land of Kolyma.

King Graham sets off at once to Kolyma to rescue Valanice. There he must travel around the land, as well as above the mountains, below the sea, and in the castle of Count Dracula to find the three keys that unlock the doors to the enchanted island where the witch Hagatha has imprisoned Valanice. Graham does so, in the process interacting with and outwitting figures such as the evil Enchanter and King Neptune, and rescues Valanice. At the end of the game, they are married in a ceremony attended by characters from the game and its predecessor.

== Development and release ==
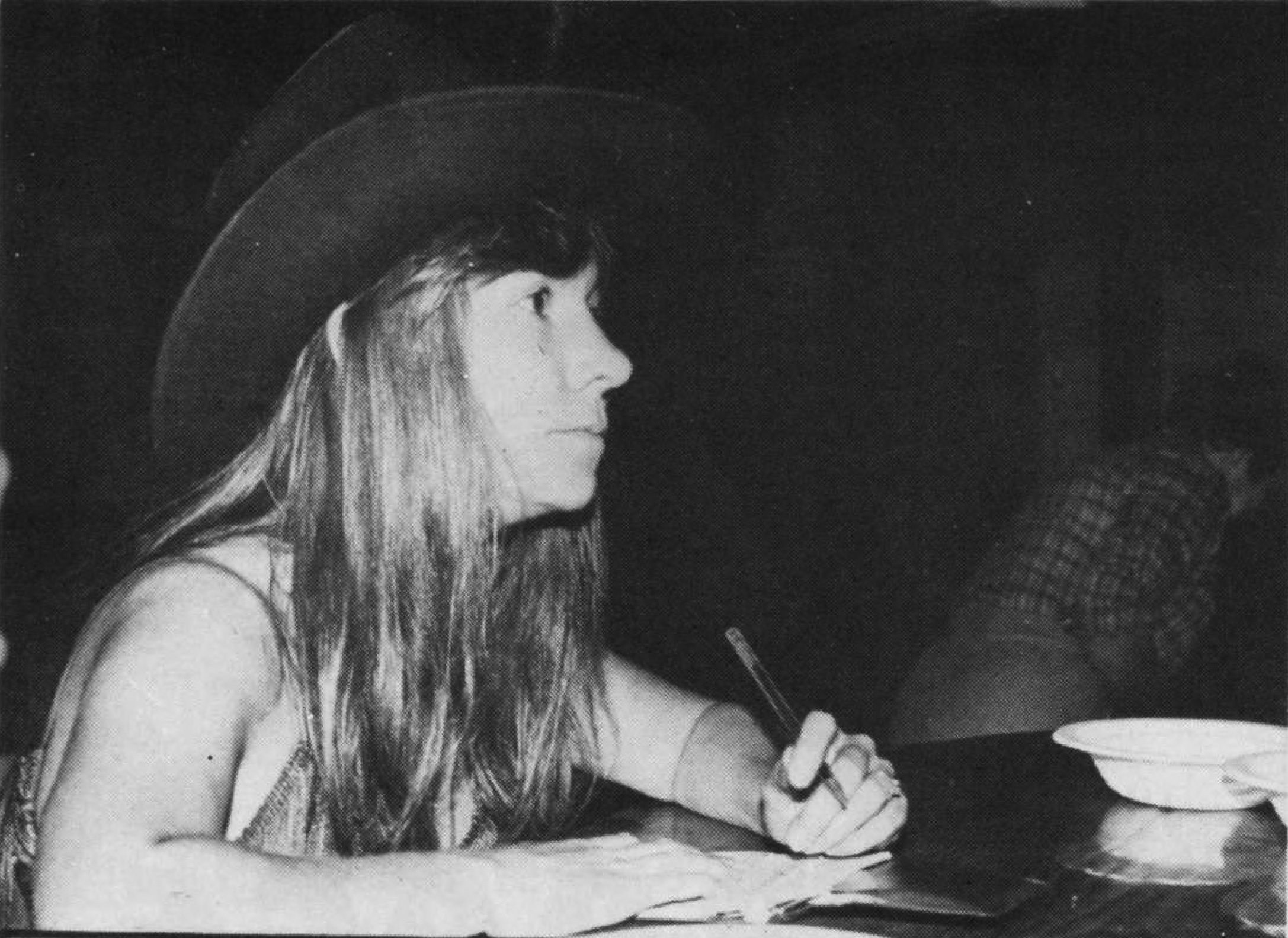
Roberta Williams in 1981

Sierra On-Line was founded in 1979 by Roberta and Ken Williams as On-Line Systems, and over the next few years released several successful adventure video games. In late 1982, it was approached by IBM to develop a graphic adventure game that would showcase the graphical capabilities of the upcoming IBM PCjr home computer. Sierra spent 18 months on the game, titled King's Quest or later King's Quest I, with Roberta Williams as the designer alongside a team of 6 programmers and artists. Williams interpreted IBM's request for a game like Wizard and the Princess (1980) literally, and decided to write a game with a heroic player-character saving a kingdom. She made the game world as a blend of common fairy tales that could be directly experienced as a game. Sierra later stated that the core elements of a King's Quest game were family-friendly humor, fairy tale themes, cute characters, a clear story, and non-violent solutions to problems.

As part of the development of King's Quest I, Sierra developed an engine for the game to interpret and react to player inputs called the Adventure Game Interpreter (AGI)—initially the "Game Adaptation Language"—which could be reused for later titles. After the successful release of the game in 1984, Sierra began working on a sequel using AGI. The parser was improved from the first game to understand over three times as many words, especially adjectives, and to handle combining phrases with "and". The development process began with Williams drafting the story and puzzles of the game on paper, before the other developers then implemented that design. The artists then began by drawing the backgrounds for each of the locations in the game; these backgrounds were saved as a set of drawing instructions, rather than images, to save space, resulting in each screen being drawn over the course of a few seconds whenever Graham enters a location. The instructions were made with a custom program used to scan in the artists' paper drawings, with the artist selecting lines or areas and setting their color and "priority", or how far in the foreground or background they are.

As Graham had become the king of Daventry at the end of the first game, Williams envisioned him going on a quest to rescue a maiden, which could then be expanded to have a family of characters in following games. Some of the elements of the game, such as King Neptune, Dracula, and characters from Little Red Riding Hood, were originally considered for King's Quest I, but could not be fit into that game. Williams wanted to use characters from mythology and fairy tales as players would incorporate their own notions about the characters when seeing them. Williams wanted to make a more complex plot, but was stymied by the memory and space limitations of computers of the time, resulting in "treasure hunts with lots of simple goals [...] and fun puzzles".

In addition to Williams, the development team included future Space Quest series designers Scott Murphy and Mark Crowe, who was one of the artists along with Doug MacNeill. The music was composed by future Leisure Suit Larry designer Al Lowe, and included thirteen tracks. The title is a reference to the 1984 film Romancing the Stone. The game was released in May 1985 as a single release that supported multiple home computer systems such as the Tandy 1000 and IBM PC compatibles, unlike the prior game which was sold as separate versions for different systems. Other home computer systems supported were the Macintosh, Apple II, Apple IIGS, Amiga, and Atari ST.

== Reception ==
King's Quest II sold over 100,000 copies by February 1987, and by mid-1987 the combined sales of the first three King's Quest games surpassed 500,000. Reviews of the game were generally positive, and the gameplay was compared positively to other games and to King's Quest I. Keith Campbell of Computer and Video Games said that it was "a totally new approach to computer adventuring", while a review from Computer Entertainer said that it had more depth and locations than the first game. Stefan Swiergiel of Aktueller Software Markt praised the text parser's understanding of player inputs, which Computer Entertainer noted as being better than King Quest I's. Brad Kershaw of Antic and Nick Clarkson of ST Action additionally praised the design of the game world and character interactions. Stephen Pietrowicz of Amazing Computing, however, found the gameplay simplistic, though harder than that of King's Quest I.

The graphics were highly praised by reviewers; Computer Entertainer said that it had "all the magic of a favorite fairy tale, and all the beauty of an animated movie", while Aktueller Software Markt and Antic praised the detailed and colorful graphics. Computer and Video Games praised the variety of animation, while a different Computer Entertainer review by Patrick McGrath said that it had the best animation of any video game. Antic and the first Computer Entertainer review also praised the story of the game, with Computer Entertainer calling it an improvement over King's Quest I. Antic concluded with a wish that "all adventures could be this enjoyable and visually stimulating", and ST Action said it was a solid introduction to Sierra's adventure games.

== Legacy ==
The lowered development costs from the reuse of AGI from King's Quest I for projects like King's Quest II and The Black Cauldron (1985) led to success for the company in the following years. The King's Quest series, which has been described as Sierra's "flagship series", includes a further six games by Sierra, beginning with King's Quest III in 1986 and concluding with King's Quest: Mask of Eternity in 1998. King's Quest II has been released in several collections of games in the series in the 1990s and 2000s. It is also included in the modern King's Quest Collection on Steam and the King's Quest 1+2+3 collection released on GOG.

In 1988, after the release of King's Quest IV, Silicon Valley Books published The King's Quest Companion, a combination hint guide and novelization by Peter Spear of the games in the series. Updated editions were released through 1997 as further games were released in the series.

In 2002, Tierra Entertainment released an unofficial remake of King's Quest II titled King's Quest II: Romancing the Stones, adding a point-and-click control system from later King's Quest games wherein the player selects preset verbs, represented by pictures, and then selects the subject, rather than typing. It also expanded the plot and added high-resolution full color graphics and voice acting, including by Josh Mandel, the voice actor for King Graham in King's Quest V and VI. Elements of the original game were incorporated into the third chapter of King's Quest (2015), "Once Upon a Climb", an episodic re-imagining of the series developed by The Odd Gentlemen and published by Activision under the Sierra Entertainment brand name for Windows, PlayStation 3, PlayStation 4, Xbox 360 and Xbox One.

== Sources ==
- Levy, Steven (May 19, 2010). Hackers: Heroes of the Computer Revolution (25th Anniversary ed.). O'Reilly Media. ISBN 978-1-4493-9374-8.
- Mills, Shawn (2020). The Sierra Adventure: The Story of Sierra On-Line. ISBN 978-1-71675-872-0.
- Spear, Peter (1997). The King's Quest Companion (4th ed.). Osborne/McGraw-Hill. ISBN 978-0-07-882401-2.
- Trivette, Donald B. (1991). The Official Book of King's Quest: Daventry and Beyond (PDF) (2nd ed.). Compute! Books. ISBN 0-87455-245-1.
- Williams, Ken (2020). Not All Fairy Tales Have Happy Endings: The rise and fall of Sierra On-Line.
