= Callahan's Crosstime Saloon =

Fictional bar/story series by Spider Robinson

- First edition
- Author: Spider Robinson
- Cover artist: Vincent Di Fate
- Language: English
- Publisher: Ace Books
- Publication date: 1977
- Publication place: United States
- Media type: Print (Paperback)
- Pages: 170
- ISBN: 0-441-09034-6

Time Travelers Strictly Cash
- Publisher: Ace Books
- Publication date: 1981
- Media type: Print (Paperback)
- ISBN: 0-441-81277-5

Callahan's Secret
- Publisher: Berkley Books
- Publication date: 1986
- Media type: Print (Paperback)
- ISBN: 0-425-09082-5

Callahan's Lady
- Publisher: Ace Books
- Publication date: 1989
- Media type: Print (hardcover)
- ISBN: 0-441-09073-7

Lady Slings the Booze
- Publisher: Ace Books
- Publication date: 1992
- Media type: Print (hardcover)
- ISBN: 0-441-46928-0

The Callahan Touch
- Publisher: Ace Books
- Publication date: 1993
- Media type: Print (hardcover)
- ISBN: 0-441-09075-3

Callahan's Legacy
- Publisher: Tor Books
- Publication date: 1996
- Media type: Print (hardcover)
- ISBN: 0-312-85776-4

Callahan's Key
- Publisher: Bantam Spectra
- Publication date: 2000
- Media type: Print (hardcover)
- ISBN: 0-553-11163-9

Callahan's Con
- Publisher: Tor Books
- Publication date: 2003
- Media type: Print (hardcover)
- ISBN: 0-7653-0270-5

Callahan's Place is a fictional bar appearing in the Callahan's Crosstime Saloon stories (compiled in the first novel of the same name) along with its sequels Time Travelers Strictly Cash and Callahan's Secret. These form part of the fictional universe of American writer Spider Robinson. Most of the characters appear in the further sequels The Callahan Touch, Callahan's Legacy, Callahan's Key, and Callahan's Con, and the computer game.

== Synopsis ==
In the book, the fictional bar is run by Mike Callahan. Strange visitors and unusual events turn up frequently in the stories. Regular characters at Callahan's include a talking dog, several extraterrestrials and time travelers, an ethical vampire, a couple of Irish mythological beings, and a parrot spewing obscenities. The stories make heavy use of puns. Irish whiskeys are the preferred beverage, with Tullamore Dew and Bushmills mentioned in nearly every collection of shorts or novel that references the saloon. The stories make an obvious homage to Fletcher Pratt and L. Sprague de Camp's Tales from Gavagan's Bar and Arthur C. Clarke's Tales from the White Hart.

In the book, Lady Sally McGee, the madam of a house of excellent repute (and Mike Callahan's wife), stars in Robinson's Callahan's Lady and Lady Slings the Booze. The characters who are regulars at Lady Sally's brothel also have fantastical backgrounds.

== Characters ==
- Jake Stonebender: The narrator of the Callahan stories. He has tried to commit suicide after losing his wife and daughter to a car accident which he believes to be his fault. His physician, Doc Webster, saved him and sent him to Callahan's. Jake is a master with his guitar, whom he calls "Lady Macbeth".
- Mike Callahan: In the book, he is the owner of the bar, he is always ready with a drink and a friendly word—though he will also deal quite firmly with anyone who deliberately breaks the bar's rules.
- Sam "Doc" Webster: M.D.; In the book, he is one of the oldest regulars and a master of puns. He works shifts at Smithtown General Hospital.
- Fast Eddie Costigan: In the book, he is the bar's piano player; he jams with Jake and is equipped with a blackjack to discourage nosy questions.
- Long Drink McGonnigle: In the book, he is one of the oldest regulars; a night watchman, and also skilled at puns.
- Tom Hauptman: In the book, he is an ex-minister and widower, who was locked away for ten years with his wife in a Latin American banana republic. He believes missing out on ten years of sociological development means he cannot do his job. Callahan offers him the job of assistant bartender after he tells his story.
- Noah Gonzalez: In the book he is a sergeant in the police force who has a prosthetic leg. He works on the bomb squad.
- Michael "Mickey" Finn: In the book, he is a humanoid alien who was sent to destroy Earth. Coming to Callahan's makes him want to reconsider; with the assistance of the patrons, he can become his being and save the planet.
- Tommy Janssen: In the book, he is a teenager who comes to Callahan's and gives up his heroin addiction.
- Tom Flannery: In the book, he is one of the former regulars who has eight months to live at the start of the series.
- "Slippery" Joe Maser: In the book, he is bigamous; both wives are aware of one another and approve of the arrangement.
- Marty Matthias: In the book, he had a gambling issue, but got it fixed after he came to Callahan's.
- Rachel: In the book, she is a woman, which is a rarity in itself at Callahan's. She may also be immortal but is long-lived at the very least.
- Shorty Steinitz: In the book, he had his appendix removed by Doc Webster on Callahan's bar. World's worst driver; makes a living restoring antique vehicles.
- Big Beef McCaffrey: In the book, he was kicked out of the bar in 1947 by Mike Callahan, without opening the solid oak door first. The door has remained unmended as a reminder. Mentioned, but does not appear in any of the stories.
- Mary Callahan Finn: In the book, she is Mike Callahan's daughter; a blacksmith. The love of Jake Stonebender's life and the wife of Mickey Finn.
- Ralph Von Wau Wau: In the book, he is a mutant talking dog and a regular customer. Regular at Lady Sally's, and a skilled ventriloquist. Often a moral barometer for newcomers: accepting Ralph as a sentient being worthy of respect is considered a final test for acceptance by the Callahan "family".
- Spider Robinson: In the book, author Spider Robinson appeared in one of the Callahan's stories as himself. When a patron asked Jake for "a double", Robinson appeared, as Jake looks exactly like him. Within the context of the series, Robinson lives in a different "ficton" (fictional universe) and has made his living as an author by writing down the stories that Jake tells him of his adventures at Callahan's, whenever the two meet by crossing over into the other's fiction.

== Stories ==
Callahan's Crosstime Saloon contains the following stories, virtually all of which were published in Analog Science Fiction and Fact:

- "The Guy with the Eyes"
- "The Time-Traveler"
- "The Centipede's Dilemma"
- "Two Heads Are Better Than One"
- "The Law of Conservation of Pain"
- "Just Dessert"
- "A Voice Is Heard in Ramah..."
- "Unnatural Causes"
- "The Wonderful Conspiracy"

Time Travelers Strictly Cash contains four Callahan stories and several non-Callahan stories and essays.

Callahan's Secret contains four Callahan stories; there is only Callahan material.

In 1987 Phantasia Press published a 1500-copy hardcover edition of Callahan and Company (ISBN 0-932096-48-4) which reprints the 18 Callahan's stories that appeared in the three previous books.

Callahan's Legacy contains three sections that were not separately published as stories.

All of the later works appeared as individual novels.

Some elements of Callahan's Lady and Lady Slings the Booze have been separately published in Pulphouse.

== Other media ==
In 1997 Legend Entertainment released a graphic adventure game for the PC (Callahan's Crosstime Saloon), designed by Josh Mandel (of Freddy Pharkas: Frontier Pharmacist fame), based on the series. The player controls Jake Stonebender (narrator of the books) through a series of bizarre adventures. Included in the game are several songs performed by Spider Robinson himself; these can be heard by talking to the pianist in the bar and asking for "one of your specialties".

The series has also been adapted as a setting for the GURPS roleplaying game covering the material of the first three Callahan's books and the first Lady Sally book.

== See also ==
- Joseph Jorkens
