= Serena (video game) =

2014 video game

- Developers: Senscape; CBE Software; Infamous Quests; Digital Media Workshop; Guys from Andromeda
- Designer: Agustín Cordes
- Writers: Simo Sakari Aaltonen; Agustín Cordes; Frederik Olsen; Troels Pleimert
- Engine: Dagon Engine
- Platforms: Windows; Linux; OS X
- Release: 30 January 2014
- Genre: Adventure game
- Mode: Single-player

Serena is a 2014 freeware horror adventure game developed by several video game development companies, including Senscape, CBE Software, Infamous Quests, Digital Media Workshop and Guys from Andromeda. It was released for Windows, Linux and OS X. The game previews the Dagon Engine that was supposed to be used in Asylum. The main characters are voiced by Josh Mandel and Sarah Wilson (YouTube blogger PushingUpRoses), as well as a cameo from Guys from Andromeda's Scott Murphy. Gameplay is first-person perspective, with fixed background screens and a point-and-click interface.

== Plot ==
Gameplay screenshot.

The game tells a story of a man (voiced by Josh Mandel) who is waiting in a cabin for his wife, Serena, but cannot remember anything about her. As he explores more of the cabin and examines the varying items throughout, his memories about her and their relationship begin returning, evoking multiple changes in his emotion.

== Background ==
The title character is named after Serena Nelson, an advocate of adventure games funded by Kickstarter. For her activism, she has often been referred to as the "Hero of the Adventure Game Revival Movement". Following an incident where Nelson was outed for being a transgender person by a studio executive, the game designer Agustín Cordes made the game Serena in response to the perceived bullying of Nelson and in support of her. The game neither involves Nelson's participation nor does the plot revolve around her treatment.
