= King's Quest III (2006 video game) =

King's Quest III: To Heir is Human
- Developer(s): Infamous Adventures
- Series: King's Quest (unofficial)
- Engine: Adventure Game Studio
- Platform(s): Microsoft Windows
- Release: June 19, 2006
- Genre(s): Adventure

King's Quest III: To Heir is Human (aka King's Quest III Remake/King's Quest III Gold Edition) is a VGA-style fangame remake/reimagining/retelling of Sierra Entertainment's King's Quest III: To Heir Is Human by Infamous Adventures. It was released on June 19, 2006. A slightly expanded remake offers new material including; new cutscenes, a few new characters, expanded narration or dialogue, additions and changes to some of the plot, full speech, new or modified locations, and Easter eggs. Most of the original puzzles remain intact (other than the spell system was streamlined) or item placement changed. The game received the AGS reward for best documentation in 2006.

== Background ==
The young baby Gwydion is kidnapped from his castle by one of the castle's staff and brought to Manannan. The boy has a hard life growing up as his slave. As is the tradition, the evil wizard will kill the boy upon his eighteenth birthday. That date is fast approaching, and it is up to Gwydion to thwart Manannan and his brother Mordack's plans, escape and find his way home.

When his master isn't watching Alexander explores Llewdor to create spells that will allow him to defeat his master. Along the way he meets the Three Bears, an Oracle, defeats Medusa, and meets other citizens of the country.

Once he defeats Manannan and leaves Llewdor, he escapes pirates, an abominable snowman, and defeats a three-headed dragon, meets a wise gnome, saves his sister, all before he can be reunited with his family. Alexander spends weeks helping his father repair the damage to the kingdom. When they are finished, Alexander and his sister are called to the throne room in their finest regalia by their father. The magic mirror is restored and Graham passes his adventure's cap to his son.

Some time later, Mordack travels to Llewdor to rescue his brother to bring him back to his island. The evil wizard burns the house, so that none would use it again, and discover Manannan's secrets.

== Features ==
- All 16 color backgrounds redrawn using a 16-bit colour scheme, to match later games in the official series
- Enhanced close up cut-scenes and dialogue pictures help immerse the player into what is known as the first plot driven chapter of the King's Quest series
- Original music by professional music composer
- A new interface (no more typing)
- New content includes item placement changes for some of the magic spell items.
- Removal of the magic spell system (all magical spells are automatically prepared and cast without the need of the player to be precise, assuming they have all the ingredients on hand).
- New close-up cutscenes interspersed throughout the game (such as when defeating Manannan or after climbing up into the mountains).
- New locations added, which make up the boundaries around the north and south of Llewdor. Daventry is completely reimagined, with new geography, locations and layout. Some of new areas are inspired by King's Quest 5 and KQ1 SCI remake (the staircase is replaced with the suspension bridges in the cave to the Dragon's roost).
- Many new descriptions and narration on each screen, most of the old replaced or rewritten, some conversations are now extended, or new conversations as well.
- A new cutscene between Mordack and Mannanan in Mordack's castle during one of his journeys from Llewdor.
- A new and original prologue story showing one interpretation of how Gwydion was kidnapped, Alexander dreaming, and extended scene with closeups of Manannan talking Alexander overlooking the land below.
- A completely reimagined oracle scene showing Graham, Valanice and Rosella's decision to be sacrificed and the guards taking Rosella away.
- A reimagined reunion scene outside of the castle of Daventry after Rosella is rescued.
- Further changes to the ending which instead of taking place directly before KQ4, it moves events of KQ4 to several months after Gwydion's return. If all points are collected an additional cutscene is seen where Mordack returns to Mannanan's house and burns it down.
- The magic map's functionality has been changed, that it can only teleport to a few key locations in each area (depending on which release of the game it may not work out at sea at all, with a message saying its magic is limited at sea).

== Development ==
Infamous Adventures released the game on June 18, 2006. The game was made by the team because they wanted to see if they could do it, and prove they had the drive and ability to recreate the game with updated graphics and sounds.

The official announcement for the game read:

"That's right, the wait is over. I smile with joy as I type these words in, thinking if this day was ever to come. The production is over, the testers are done and everything is ready to go. King's Quest III has finally been released. Remember this date, the 18th of June. The day KQ3 was released!
It's been twenty years since the evil wizard Manannan first appeared on our computer screens, but now, thanks to the hard work and dedication of the team at Infamous Adventures, he's back!"

Infamous Adventures decided to remake the remake to create a game that would run on modern computers, and bring it up to the quality of King's Quest 5. It was made in the tradition of AGD Interactive's King's Quest remakes.

== Geography ==
- Llewdor: Llewdor is a wild land bounded by an impassible swamp to the north, a crevasse to the south, the desert of Talinor to the west, and the ocean to the east.
- Talinor: A dry and dusty great desert lying west of Llewdor. It is home of Medusa (and her sisters), lizards, snakes, and buzzards. A steep rocky cliff borders the entrance to the north.
- Mountains
- Daventry
- Cloudland
- Mordack's Island: The strange island were Mordack lives far out at sea. Its grotesque geography seems to defy gravity. Mordack's castle is located at the center of the island. Mananann often travels to the island on business with his brother. They discuss their plans from Mordack's study. Manannan comments that his brother lives in a strange setting unlike his rather normal conditions back in Llewdor.

== Characters ==
- Gwydion/Alexander: A slave to the wizard Manannan his whole life, Gwydion is the hero of this tale. He must escape the evil wizard and make his way out into the world before the wizard decides he has outlived his usefulness.
- Maid: Even the royal family's servants are not above Manannan's influence, and the maid that took young Gwydion proves it. The Maid kidnapped Alexander and brought him to the docks to give to Manannan. She hopes to be rewarded for her treachery, but is quickly wiped out of existence by the evil wizard. She is a new character added to the game, and did not appear in the original.
- Manannan: The evil wizard has kept watch over the land of Llewdor for a long time and has had more than one "servant" to do his bidding. Surely the world would be a better place if someone found a way to turn the old wizard's evil magic against him. He is voiced by Andy Hoyos (former Sierra artist and developer on games such as KQ7 and KQV), who did the voice of Mordack in KQ5.
- Mordack: The younger brother of Manannan, Mordack is sure to have his own evil abode somewhere in the world. Manannan travels to Mordack's island during one of his journeys during the game. Mordack discusses Manannan's plans, and approaching event, of Alexander's demise, and how they intend to return the body back to his parents. Later Mordack returns to Manannan's house to take his brother, and burn the house to the ground. He is voiced by Andy Hoyos, who reprised the role of Mordack from King's Quest V: Absence Makes the Heart Go Yonder!. He is a new character introduced to the game, and did not appear in the original.
- Barmaid: She runs the tavern in Port Bruce.
- Shopkeeper: A small store in Port Bruce is run by a friendly man and his dog.
- Medusa: A creature of countless nightmares, Medusa is said to turn anyone that looks upon her to stone. Travel through the desert becomes much less appealing knowing that she is out there somewhere. Gwydion forces her to look at herself, destroying her. As she turned to stone she called upon her sisters to avenge her.
- Oracle: Able to see visions of events throughout the world, the mysterious oracle has no desire to leave her dark cave.
- Rosella: The princess of Daventry has many duties she must attend to, but the duty this time seems to be serving as a sacrifice to the Dragon that is ruining the realm.
- Valanice: The queen of Daventry makes only a brief appearance.
- Graham: The king of Daventry has been through a great deal, but it seems there is little he can do about the dragon terrorizing his realm. If only he had an heir that could take up where he left off. Josh Mandel (the developer-producer of King's Quest I: Quest for the Crown remake) reprised his role from previous KQ games. He had previously been the voice of King Graham in King's Quest V and King's Quest VI, and other fan remakes by AGD Interactive (King's Quest I VGA and King's Quest II: Romancing the Stones).
- Gnome: A much kindlier being than that encountered by Graham in his search for the royal treasures, this gnome makes his home near Castle Daventry and has a fair bit of knowledge about is happening in the realm.
- Kenny: A loyal and friendly pet of the Port Bruce Shopkeeper, the dog enjoys the attention he is given by customers.
- Three Bears: These strange bears have made themselves a small cottage in the forests of Llewdor. They don't take to strangers, for them bad, because they are rumored to make the best porridge around.
- Bandits: There are three places that Gwydion may encounter the bandits. It is their duty to steal others belongings and there is always a chance that Gwydion will be the unfortunate target. They are also seen (and possibly overheard) in the Port Bruce Tavern and can be found in their secret hideout.
- Cat: Manannan's cat wanders all around the house. He and Gwydion don't seem to get along too well so watch out for the hairy thing, and don't forget that a good swift kick may not be out of the question.
- Baba Yaga: The witch is not easily found and serves no real purpose in the game. She can provide a quick walk down memory lane if Gwydion does manage to stumble upon her little house.
- Chipmunk & Squirrel: Chipmunks and Squirrels frolic about in the forests of Llewdor. Surely they have seen and heard much while innocently collecting their dinner.
- Ravens: The forests of Llewdor are home to many different birds.
- Lizards: Throughout the desert in Llewdor small creatures can be found moving about. With little else to do, the lizards are likely to know a good deal of local gossip.
- Chickens: Manannan keeps two chickens in a small coop near the house. The feathery little critters have been around a long time and may know more than poor Gwydion thinks.
- Rats: Large ships have always been home to countless vermin.
- Guard: The Castle Daventry has many loyal men in its employ.
- Pirates: Port Bruce has seen its fair share of pirates. Bandits on boats, pirates are the subject of many tales involving buried treasure and are known to do many things to get their hands gold coin.
- Guybrush Threepwood: A life of adventure on Monkey Island has shown he can overcome (or lie his way out of) difficult situations.

== Version history ==
- King's Quest III 1.0 was released on the 18 (America) and 19 June 2006 (worldwide)
- 2.0 was released on the 21 August 2006, including the Voicepack edition
- King's Quest III Gold Edition v3.0 (cancelled)

== See also ==
- King's Quest III: To Heir Is Human (AGD Interactive)
- King's Quest III: To Heir Is Human
- Space Quest II: Vohaul's Revenge (Infamous Adventures)
