= The Silver Lining (video game) =

- Developer: Phoenix Online Studios
- Series: King's Quest (unofficial)
- Platform: Microsoft Windows
- Release: July 18, 2010 – TBD
- Genre: Adventure
- Mode: single-player

The Silver Lining (TSL) is an episodic video fangame based on the King's Quest series, which was developed and released in free download format by Phoenix Online Studios for Microsoft Windows starting on July 18, 2010. While five chapters were planned, the most recent release, Episode 4: 'Tis in My Memory Locked. And You Yourself Shall Hold The Key Of It, was released on November 8, 2011.

Although the game features 3D graphics, its gameplay departs from Sierra Online's last King's Quest release, The Mask of Eternity, which was mainly criticized for its RPG-like atmosphere, and settles into that created by the previous titles (for example, the setting returns to the land of the Green Isles, visited in King's Quest VI: Heir Today, Gone Tomorrow, while some recurring characters include Mannanan from King's Quest III: To Heir Is Human and Pan from King's Quest IV: The Perils of Rosella). The plot itself revolves around King Graham as he desperately seeks the help of ancient druidic artifacts to undo the evil cast upon his children, Alexander and Rosella.

The fifth and final episode for the series, A Thousand Times Good Night, supposedly remains in development after multiple delays since 2011, with the last major update being in January 31st, 2019. Since Phoenix Online Studios changed its name to Phoenix Online Publishing on 19 May 2014 in order to respecialize for publishing of independent quest games and focus on more profitable endeavors. The company soon made a statement of releasing all rights to the game to Activision upon request. In August the same year, Activision began to collaborate with its Sierra Entertainment division on new King's Quest game.

== Episodes ==
- "Episode 1: What is Decreed Must Be" (July 10, 2010)
- "Episode 2: Two Households" (September 18, 2010)
- "Episode 3: My Only Love Sprung From My Only Hate" (February 17, 2011)
- "Episode 4: ‘Tis in My Memory Locked. And You Yourself Shall Hold The Key Of It" (November 6, 2011)
- "Episode 5: A Thousand Times Goodnight" (Unknown. Development team has not announced a date, possibly abandoned)

== Game development ==
Production of TSL began in October 2000. After a long period of limited production and loss of focus, the original team was reorganized under César Bittar, previously one of the project writers, in January 2002. Dividing the production crew into five departments (Art, Design, Audio, Programming, and Public Relations), he turned Phoenix into an efficient working unit. Little of the original plot was kept, so its resemblance to the original team's concept is limited.

The game was intended to be released as a trilogy, but later was altered to be released as a single game. The finished game was to contain Chapters 1 and 2 at first, but soon into the plot writing, a third chapter was added, and then the team has added two more. Although it has been originally proposed to end the game on a cliffhanger, the team has actually thought through a "decent" ending, but has yet to implement it due to delays and increased attention on commercial projects.

A short demo of Chapter 1 was released on July 30, 2006. A beta testing build containing 3 scenes from Chapter 1 was released on March 9, 2008. Later in June 2009 the team said that in the next couple of months they would be working to put the finishing touches on the game and submit it to Vivendi Games, Inc for approval. There was a delay in production from late 2009 to early 2010, when the first chapter was finally achieved and released on 18 July.

After releasing Chapters 3 and 4, many of the team workers have abandoned the project due to budget issues, and went on to perform paid work for their second game, Cognition. Bittar said in late 2011 that he has managed to keep 5-6 guys still working on TSL, basically for free, and that he was looking to split the studios into two divisions in order to retain interest in the game. Several files have since then leaked online on quest forums, but none amount to be sufficient to complete Chapter 5. In mid-2012, one of Phoenix's workers said a Telltale Games forum thread that the company has decided to release Chapter 5 for free to anyone willing to finish it. The sequence of events surrounding this statement remains unclear.

=== Delays and legal issues ===
The initial project was titled King's Quest IX: Every Cloak Has A Silver Lining (or KQ IX for short). Due to legal issues with Vivendi Games, Inc in 2005, and parent company Activision throughout 2009—10, the title has been changed.

From its inception, the TSL project's stated intention was to give closure to the King's Quest series with the belief and assertion that the project was legal under U.S. fair use copyright law, though acknowledging that this was a legal gray area. The developers maintained a notice on their site promising to end the project if confronted by Vivendi Universal, the owner of the King's Quest license. In September 2005, after over four years of development, and immediately after providing their first trailer and announcing a release date, Phoenix Online Studios received a cease and desist e-mail from Vivendi. Phoenix kept their word and immediately halted all development on the project as they entered negotiations with Vivendi. Once the news was made public, fans of the game and the series began a mass mailing and e-mailing campaign organized by the Save King's Quest IX team to persuade Vivendi to allow Phoenix Online Studios to complete the project.

On November 29, 2005, Phoenix Online Studios was granted a Fan License by Vivendi. The license allowed for resumption of project development with the requirement that the title be changed to remove the "King's Quest" reference. All characters, locations, art, story, plot, and script content were permitted to remain unchanged. According to César Bittar, the full title at the time was The Silver Lining: a game inspired by the King's Quest series.

After Vivendi Games merged with Activision in 2008, the latter became the new owner of the King's Quest franchise. Subsequently, Activision revoked the non-commercial license agreement previously negotiated between Vivendi and Phoenix Online Studios. After several months of negotiations, Activision issued its own cease-and-desist to The Silver Lining team, requesting that they cease production and take down all related materials on the game website. On June 26, 2010, Activision had changed its mind and decided to allow The Silver Lining to be released, which was agreed on condition of TSL remaining a free release and Activision still keeping the rights to all the content bearing resemblance to the original series.

Sometime in June 2014, Phoenix has turned over the rights to Activision, whose owners were looking to reboot the series, but keeping it a secret (this is why Phoenix has started with a statement of becoming a publisher first). On August 7, Activision has announced the opening Sierra Entertainment, which then presented the official reboot of the series in 2015. Sierra now legally retains the rights to TSL publication, but so far, the game is still available for free at Phoenix. In fact, TSL has always been the intellectual property of Activision, who once simply granted Phoenix the right to produce their game for freeware distribution, with all changes upon request (like removing "King's Quest" from the title).

=== Release ===
"Episode 1: What is Decreed Must Be" was released on July 10, 2010 as a free download and served as a "re-introduction" to the world of King's Quest. The chapter focused on setting the stage for the following episodes.

"Episode 2: Two Households" was released on September 18, 2010 as a free download. Marking a return to classic, Sierra-style adventure, Episode 2 sees King Graham investigate the mysterious curse upon his children as he searches for ingredients for an antidote. Taking into account criticism from the gaming community in response to Episode 1, Phoenix Online implemented numerous improvements to The Silver Lining for the release of Episode 2, including an option to toggle between shorter and longer narrations, improved pathfinding, a more realistic walking animation, the addition of a run/walk mode, and widescreen support.

"Episode 3: My Only Love Sprung From My Only Hate" was released on February 18, 2011 as a free download. This chapter contains more puzzles than the last two episodes and features King Graham's continuing quest to free his children. As a return to the classic problem-solving of the older games, note-taking is recommended, as well as returning multiple times to certain areas to see what has changed.

"Episode 4: Tis in My Memory Locked and You Yourself Shall Keep the Key of It" was released on November 6, 2011 as a free download.

"Episode 5: A Thousand Times Goodnight": Development status unknown. No release date has been announced.

== Reception ==
The first episode of The Silver Lining was met with both praise and disappointment often in the same review, with most criticizing the voice acting, the lack of puzzles, and the short length. The reaction to the quality of the graphics and music was more mixed in nature. Most said they would be giving the future episodes a try. MobyGames calculated an overall aggregate score of 68 based on eight reviews, while Metacritic was calculated an overall score of 66 based on five reviews. MobyGames gave the second episode an aggregate score of 73 based on six reviews, and the third episode a score of 67 based on five reviews.

PC PowerPlay provided a generally favorable review, finding the first three episodes enjoyable, and "polished and entertaining" overall, stating "the world is colourful, the characters are likeable and the puzzles are inconceivable; features all [King's Quest] fans will enjoy".
