= Robert Adamson (actor) =

American actor (born 1985)

- Born: Robert Gillespie Adamson IV; July 11, 1985 (age 41); Salt Lake City, Utah, U.S.
- Education: The American Academy of Dramatic Arts
- Occupations: Actor, director
- Years active: 2005–present
- Children: 1

Robert Gillespie Adamson IV (born July 11, 1985) is an American actor and director. He is best known for playing the roles of Charles Antoni on the Freeform series Lincoln Heights (2007 to 2009), Phil Sanders on the TeenNick series Hollywood Heights (2012), and Noah Newman on the CBS Daytime soap opera The Young and the Restless (2012 to 2018, 2020).

== Early life and education ==
Adamson was born in Salt Lake City, Utah and spent his childhood in St. George. He started secondary school in Springville, then moved to Hawaii. Adamson returned to Utah to attend Alta High School. He became interested in acting the summer before his senior year, when he auditioned for a Shakespeare Festival. To his surprise, he was cast in Othello. He went on to attend The American Academy of Dramatic Arts.

== Career ==
Adamson's early credits include guest appearances on Cold Case and It's Always Sunny in Philadelphia. He was cast in a Disney Channel Original Movie, Princess Protection Program, co-starring with Demi Lovato and Selena Gomez. Adamson also guest starred on Sonny with a Chance and had a recurring role on Jonas.

Adamson had roles in the films It's Complicated, Devolved, Machine Head and The Prankster. He voiced the lead avatar Gwydion/Prince Alexander in the video game King's Quest III Redux.

He landed a regular role as Charles on the ABC Family drama series, Lincoln Heights. Adamson then played another regular role as Phil on Hollywood Heights. This led to him being cast as Noah Newman on the CBS Daytime soap opera The Young and the Restless, replacing Kevin Schmidt. He first aired on October 1, 2012.

During his time on Y&R, Adamson appeared in the film Zoey to the Max and guest starred on NCIS. He directed the short films Running Up That Hill, Something Wicked, and Jimmy. The latter starred John McCook and his daughter, Molly McCook. In 2016, it was announced that he would direct and star in a short film Our Last Day as Children, co-starring with Hunter King and Linsey Godfrey. He directed another short film Broken Strings, which starred Darin Brooks, Kelly Kruger, and Kim Matula.

Adamson was dropped to recurring status at The Young and the Restless in 2016. He announced in February 2018 that he had been dismissed from the show. In 2020, he made a short return to the role of Noah Newman.

He starred as Caleb Hirsche in the horror film The Axe Murders of Villisca. He also appeared as Rick in the film Deviant Love. Adamson then landed a recurring role on Stumptown in 2020, followed by guest appearances on All Rise and Dave. He also starred in a Lifetime TV movie, Who Wants Me Dead?

In June 2019, Adamson played Biff Loman in Death of a Salesman at the Ruskin Group Theatre in Los Angeles. He co-starred with Rob Morrow and Lee Garlington.

In 2022, Adamson temporarily played Michael Corinthos on General Hospital, replacing Chad Duell while he was ill. He was then cast as Patrick in the Tubi horror film The Final Rose, co-starring with Brittany Underwood. Adamson's next project was a short film, Midnight Ruin, co-starring with Robert Palmer Watkins.

In October 2024, he returned to General Hospital as Michael Corinthos. Adamson temporarily replaced Chad Duell, who was absent due to a scheduling conflict.

== Personal life ==
Adamson and then-fiancée Linsey Godfrey welcomed a daughter on June 12, 2014. He and Godfrey made their last public appearance together on April 26, 2015, at the Daytime Emmy Awards. On August 3, 2015, after months of speculation, a representative for The Bold and the Beautiful confirmed that Adamson and Godfrey had ended their engagement but would continue to raise their daughter "in a loving and amicable environment and her needs will always be their common priority".

== Filmography ==
=== Film ===
Year	Title	Role	Notes
2005	Dr. Chopper	Nick	
2008	Private High Musical	Trey Belton	YouTube, Parody of High School Musical
2009	Devolved	The Rog	
2009	The Prankster	Eric Hood	
2009	It's Complicated	College Kid at Party	
2011	Machine Head	Shane	
2013	Lip Service	Nick Martin	
2014	Time to Shine	Young James Scott	
2015	Zoey to the Max	Deputy Dan	
2016	The Axe Murders of Villisca	Caleb Hirsche	
2019	Deviant Love	Rick	
2022	The Final Rose	Patrick	
2023	Midnight Ruin	Oliver	Short film

=== Television ===
Year	Title	Role	Notes
2005	Cold Case	Frank - 1995	Episode: "Ravaged"
2005–2025	It's Always Sunny in Philadelphia	Trey	2 episodes
2007–2009	Lincoln Heights	Charles Antoni	43 episodes
2009	Sonny with a Chance	Hayden	Episode: "Sonny in the Kitchen with Dinner"
2009	In the Mix	Caleb	Television film
2009	Princess Protection Program	Donny	Disney Channel Original Movie
2010	Jonas	Ben	Episodes: "Date Expectations" and "A Wasabi Story"
2012	Hollywood Heights	Phil Sanders	80 episodes
2012–2018, 2020	The Young and the Restless	Noah Newman	October 1, 2012 – September 7, 2020
2015	NCIS	Lucas Craig	Episode: "Cadence"
2016	Mary + Jane	Channing	Episode: "YouCube"
2019–2020	Stumptown	Jeremy Stevens	Episodes: "The Past and the Furious", "All Quiet on the Dextern Front", "The Dex Files"
2020	All Rise	Aidan Matthews	Episode: "In the Fights"
2020	Who Wants Me Dead?	Corey	Television film
2021	Dave	Ryan	Episode: "Dave"
2022; 2024	General Hospital	Michael Corinthos	Temporary recast 9 episodes
2023	One Night Stand Murder	Fletcher Doyle	Television film

=== Video games ===
Year	Title	Role	Notes
2011	King's Quest III Redux: To Heir is Human	Gwydion / Prince Alexander	AGD Interactive Remake

=== Director ===
Year	Title	Notes
2013	Running Up That Hill	Short film
2013	Something Wicked	Short film
2015	Jimmy	Short film
2016	Broken Strings	Short film
2016	Our Last Day as Children	Short film
2017	Ashes	Short film
