= Stair Quest =

2016 video game

- Developer: No More For Today
- Engine: AGS
- Platforms: Windows, Linux, Mac OS X
- Release: May 18, 2016
- Genre: Adventure
- Mode: Single-player

Stair Quest is a non-commercial comedy adventure game serving as an homage to Sierra's King's Quest series and similar games, originally released in 2016. The game takes place within a classic Sierra game interface; despite this, however, you are tasked primarily with traversing screens full of stairs to comedic effect, an aspect of Sierra's earlier adventure games that has been noted as a point of contention among players for difficulty.

== Gameplay ==
One of the screens in Stair Quest. Many of the stairs in the game require careful trial and error to navigate without falling off.

Stair Quest features controls and a graphical style akin to early Sierra adventure game titles. The player can walk around each screen in the four cardinal directions with the arrow keys, as well as type out and execute commands from a text parser. The majority of commands available to the player provide nothing more than an entertaining response, with only one command being required to complete the game, "get orb". Each screen in the game is composed of staircases and ledges, each with different themes, including a room with a staircase adorned with several cats and one lion, a nod to the cat in King's Quest III who will trip the player on one of the staircases if touched. The player is frequently at risk of falling off of these stairs or ledges, which results in a Game Over. This usually makes saving and restoring your game a necessity for a casual playthrough. One point is given to the player for each screen successfully navigated, out of an intimidating possible score of 500, however only 23 of these points are attainable before the score jumps to 500 upon the game's completion. Once the top of the mountain in the game is scaled, the player is prompted to return down the mountain through each screen a second time before winning.

== Development ==
Stair Quest was originally developed in two weeks as an entry in the 2016 Adventure Jam. Project lead Jess "decafjedi" Morrisette has stated that the game stemmed from the idea of games that "[weren't] necessarily fun to play, but [were] still compelling and sucked you into its gameplay loop", citing Papers, Please as an inspiration he had been playing at the time. The game's retro soundtrack was composed by Frederik Olsen.

A Special Edition, with added rooms, improved animation, and fixed bugs was released on 9 January 2017.

== Reception ==
- Stair Quest was nominated for five AGS Awards for 2016, including Best Gameplay and Best Short Game.
- Luke Plunkett of Kotaku described it as an "80s gaming nightmare".
- William Hughes of The A.V. Club coined the term "frustalgia" to characterize Stair Quest and said "there are worse ways to spend 10 minutes of your life".
- Joel Couture wrote in Siliconera that Stair Quest had "a humorous, if vicious, focus on how frustrating" parts of the old-school adventure games could be, and calls it a "maddening, yet lighthearted adventure of stairs and gaming history".
