= Fester Mudd: Curse of the Gold =

2013 point-and-click adventure video game

- Developer: Prank Ltd.
- Publisher: Replay Games
- Designer: Paavo Härkönen
- Programmer: Josh Mandel
- Engine: Unity
- Platforms: Linux, Microsoft Windows, Macintosh, Ouya, Steam, iOS, Android
- Release: November 4, 2013 (Steam)
- Genre: Point-and-click adventure game
- Mode: Single-player

Fester Mudd: Curse of the Gold is a point-and-click adventure game created by independent Finnish developer Paavo Härkönen for the Linux, Microsoft Windows, Macintosh, Ouya, iOS, Android, and Steam platforms. The game was designed with elements of typical Lucasarts adventure games from the 90s. It was originally meant to be a trilogy, but some time during the development of the second episode, the project was cancelled.

== Plot ==
The game is set in the Wild West. The first episode titled "A Fistful of Pocket Lint" has the inept but keen Fester Mudd receiving news from his brother Bud of striking gold and to meet him in the town of Loamsmouth. Once Fester gets there, he finds his brother is missing. He requires the help of a gunslinger to help him cross the Injun lands, but first needs to raise the money to hire him.

== Reception ==
Fester Mudd: Curse of the Gold

Aggregate score
Aggregator	Score
Metacritic	76/100 (PC); 83/100 (iOS)

Review scores
Publication	Score
Adventure Gamers	3/5 (PC)
148Apps	4/5 (iOS)

Award
Publication	Award
Pocket Gamer	Silver Award
