= The Dagger of Amon Ra =

1992 video game

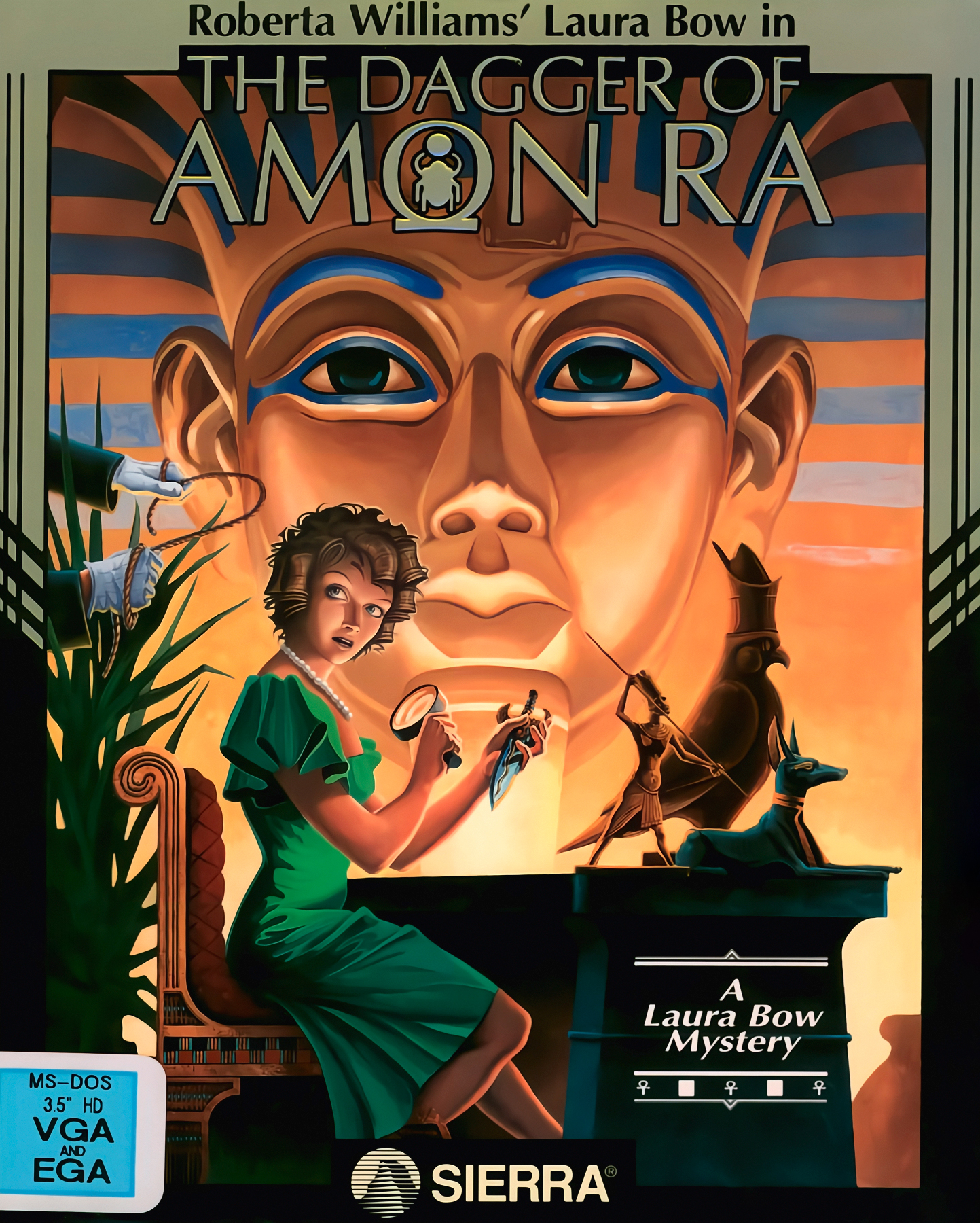
- Developer: Sierra On-Line
- Publisher: Sierra On-Line
- Directors: Bruce Balfour; Bill Davis (creative)
- Producer: Bruce Balfour
- Designer: Bruce Balfour
- Programmer: Brian K. Hughes
- Artist: Cheryl Sweeney
- Writer: Josh Mandel
- Composers: Chris Braymen; Mark Seibert
- Engine: SCI 1.1
- Platforms: MS-DOS; Windows
- Release: 1992 (floppy disk); 1993 (CD-ROM)
- Genre: Adventure game
- Mode: Single-player

Roberta Williams' Laura Bow in The Dagger of Amon Ra (also known as Laura Bow II: The Dagger of Amon Ra) is a computer adventure game published by Sierra On-Line in 1992. The game is a sequel to The Colonel's Bequest, which also featured Laura Bow. Unlike the first game, it was not written or designed by Roberta Williams, who was instead a creative consultant on the project. It uses 8-bit color and a point-and-click interface. A CD-ROM version was released in 1993 which included voice acting. The Dagger of Amon Ra was developed using Sierra's Creative Interpreter (SCI1.1). It was re-released in 2017 on GOG.com with modern Windows support.

== Gameplay ==
The Laura Bow games were distinctive in that they required some actual logical detective work on the part of the player; for the most part, though, the puzzles were of the typical variety of inventory and environment interaction (and frequent, often unexpected, player character death) found in most Sierra adventures.

Gameplay utilizes a point-and-click interface featuring icons for various actions, similar to other Sierra games published during that time. An additional icon is used to ask characters a question about a topic listed in Laura's notebook, which auto-populates with names, places, and other subjects that she has previously heard or encountered.

The identity of the murderer is not automatically revealed at the end of the game. Instead, the player is asked a series of questions, ostensibly by the police, to see if Laura had solved the crimes and discovered the secrets of the other suspects. If the questions are answered incorrectly, the coroner will give a vague hint towards the path that would have revealed the correct answer in subsequent gameplay. The ending of the game can change depending on the answers given to the questions, most notably in that Laura can be killed if the player does not know the identity of the main murderer.

The game includes "The Official Guide to the Leyendecker Museum", which also serves as the game's manual. It features a map of the main level of the museum and a rough drawing of the lower level.

The game's creative director, Bill Davis, based the game's visual style, and named the game's central setting, after artist J. C. Leyendecker.

== Plot ==
The game is set in 1926, primarily in a museum, and reflects the Egyptology craze of the period. The protagonist is Laura Bow (a reference to Clara Bow), a Southern belle who has just graduated from Tulane University and moved to New York City, where she has landed a job at a prestigious newspaper, The New York Daily Register News Tribune. For her first assignment, she investigates the theft of the Dagger of Amon Ra from the Leyendecker Museum's Egyptian exhibit.

Laura's investigation begins with interviews around the city before attending the museum's fundraising gala that evening. When the first murder occurs during the party, she becomes locked inside with all the other suspects. Trapped overnight in the museum, Laura navigates increasingly dangerous circumstances as additional crimes unfold throughout the building's exhibits and hidden passages.

Laura Bow investigating Dr. Myklos's office, showing the game's interface and museum setting

The investigation reveals interconnected schemes involving art forgery, identity theft, and a secret Egyptian cult operating in the museum's basement. Laura discovers that the museum's Egyptian collection harbors both ancient mysteries and modern deceptions. The case grows more complex as she uncovers romantic entanglements among the staff, a criminal network extending beyond the museum, and evidence that the original theft was orchestrated from within.

Laura's survival depends on solving puzzles, avoiding death traps, and piecing together clues scattered throughout the museum's diverse exhibits. She is expected to figure out which of the suspects are guilty of the killings that occur that night.

The game features four different endings, depending on whether Laura gathers enough evidence to expose both the murderer and the thief. These endings include combinations of different fates for the antagonists, Laura's romantic prospects, her job status, and the fate of the dagger.

== Characters ==
- Laura Bow – After graduating from Tulane University, Laura Bow was hired as a reporter by a prestigious New York newspaper. Her first assignment is to investigate and report on the theft of the Dagger of Amon Ra, taking over from the reporter Crodfoller T. Rhubarb.
- Dr. Archibald Carrington III – A former curator of the British Museum, Carrington was appointed to become the new president of the Leyendecker Museum after the death of the previous president, Sterling Waldorf-Carlton. At the start of the story, Carrington has worked at the museum for only a few weeks.
- Yvette Delacroix – The amorous French secretary of the Leyendecker Museum president. She has worked as a secretary under both Dr. Archibald Carrington, the current president, and Sterling Waldorf-Carlton, Carrington's late predecessor. Years ago, Delacroix worked as a call girl at a speakeasy. She has a deep sexual fondness for men and maintains relationships with several men at the same time, including Ernie Leach and Detective Ryan O'Riley.
- Dr. Pippin Carter – An arrogant, self-important English archeologist, Carter discovered the Dagger of Amon Ra within a long-buried temple in Egypt. In the weeks before the story begins, he had been busy preparing the new Egyptology section for the Leyendecker museum. Carter is fastidious about his personal hygiene and appearance. He sometimes talks about, and compares himself to, his cousin, who is implied to be archaeologist Howard Carter.
- Wolf Heimlich – The chief of security at the Leyendecker Museum, Wolf is obsessed with order and takes to his duties with an almost fanatical devotion. Dressed in a German military uniform, Wolf can often be found patrolling the museum grounds in a goosestep march. He also collects various types of weapons, keeping them in his office. Wolf is in a relationship with Dr. Olympia Myklos.
- Dr. Olympia Myklos – A native of Athens, Greece, Myklos is a curator at the Leyendecker Museum, specializing in paleontology. She has a morbid fascination with death and keeps exotic pet animals, including a ferret named Daisy and an Egyptian cobra named Barney.
- Ernie Leach – The custodian and handyman of the Leyendecker Museum. A hard-working, African American man, Ernie took employment at the museum to pay off his gambling debts to a loan shark.
- Ryan Hanrahan O'Riley – An Irish American detective in the NYPD, O'Riley is the detective assigned to investigate the theft of the Dagger of Amon Ra. He keeps fit every day and is fond of grapes.
- Steve Dorian – An art student, Steve Dorian works as a part-time dockworker to meet his financial needs. His name is a pun on the word "stevedore".
- Dr. Ptahsheptut "Tut" Smith – A curator from the Egyptian Museum who is deeply opposed to Dr. Carter's claim over the Dagger of Amon Ra. His arguments with Carter concerning the Dagger have almost come to blows on several occasions.
- Lawrence "Ziggy" Ziegfeld – A small-time local criminal who sometimes works for the NYPD as an informant in exchange for leniency. He has many connections and resources within the criminal underworld and can often be found in one of New York's many speakeasies. Due to his status as a "stool pigeon", he is distrusted by criminals and police officers alike. Because of this, he is extremely paranoid, and his face often twitches nervously.
- Rameses Najeer – An Egyptian accountant of the museum, he is opposed to Dr. Carter's claim over the Dagger of Amon Ra. Najeer is a successful man who is married with one child and expecting another. He is proud of his Egyptian heritage, despite having lived in the United States for many years. Others describe him as a hard worker and a good family man, but he can be intense and passionate at times.
- Countess Lavinia Waldorf-Carlton – The widow of the previous museum president, Sterling Waldorf-Carlton. She is currently engaged in a legal battle concerning Sterling's will and her entitlements as his spouse. Sterling and Lavinia met during a trip on board an ocean liner about a year prior and married only a month or two later.
- Sam Augustini – The editor-in-chief of The New York Daily Register News Tribune, he is Laura's boss and hired her to write a story on the museum's benefit party. He is close friends with Laura's father, John Bow, who once saved the editor's life.
- Crodfoller T. "Rhub" Rhubarb – Laura's co-worker, he tries to help Laura whenever possible, but is also reluctant to Augustini's decision to send Laura to write a report of the dagger's theft when she is only just a rookie. If Laura fails to solve the murder mysteries and dagger theft, he would take over the case and solve them instead.
- Lo Fat – The jocular, Chinese American owner of Lo Fat's Laundry, a Chinese laundry in New York City. Originally from Newark, New Jersey, Fat is a faithful patron of the Leyendecker Museum. Through his business, he has made acquaintances with many major contributors to the museum. Laura acquires the names of many of the supporting characters through Fat's connections. Fat also provided Laura with her evening dress for the museum party.
- Watney Little – An English fugitive and con artist who is wanted by Scotland Yard. Little recently escaped from Dartmoor Prison, with police still investigating the circumstances behind the escape.
- Henri Le Mort – A coroner who holds the inquest into the murders at the Leyendecker museum and the theft of the Dagger of Amon Ra. He asks Laura a variety of questions about the murders, the theft, and other matters that may have a bearing on the case.
- Rocco – A taxi driver who shares interesting facts of the times, such as the first Transatlantic radiotelephone call, while transporting Laura to various locations in the game.

== Reception ==
Computer Gaming World stated that Amon Ra was "much improved over" The Colonel's Bequest. The magazine criticized the "slow and repetitive" gameplay in the first two acts, and the possibility of unwinnable situations, but said that from Act 3 on, "the game is very difficult to set aside". It praised Amon Ra as a "visual and aural treat", stating that its creators "should be justifiably proud", approved of the game's serious, realistic tone with "a touch of humor", and called the use of a female protagonist "refreshing". The magazine concluded that the game was "another quality adventure from the fertile minds at Sierra". In April 1994, the magazine said that Amon Ra had a "much more believable 1920s setting" than its predecessor, and "calls on the player's attention to detail and deductive reasoning skills". The game received 4 out of 5 stars in Dragon. Cynthia E. Field of PC Games called Amon Ra "a captivating whodunit" and praised the game's "near-perfect blending of sound effects, music, and graphics".

In April 1994 Computer Gaming World said that the CD version's "hand-painted art, emotive stereo soundtrack, deep puzzles, and a convoluted storyline all combine to make this multimedia game a winner".
