= King's Quest II: Romancing the Stones =

2002 video game

- Developer: AGD Interactive (formerly Tierra Entertainment)/Himalaya Studios
- Series: King's Quest (unofficial)
- Engine: Adventure Game Studio
- Platforms: Microsoft Windows, Macintosh
- Release: 2002/2009 (Enhanced Edition)
- Genre: Adventure

King's Quest II: Romancing the Stones (aka King's Quest II+ and King's Quest II VGA) is a fangame reimagining/retelling of Sierra Entertainment's King's Quest II: Romancing the Throne by AGD Interactive produced through a fan license by Sierra Entertainment (a subsidiary of Activision Blizzard). It was followed up by King's Quest III: To Heir Is Human. In 2009, the version 3.0 Enhanced Edition was released, with improved graphics and full-speech narration. The game earned the AGS award for best music and game in 2002.

== Plot ==
The game is more of a retelling or reimagining of the story than a simple remake. The overall premise of the game is the same as the original: the recently crowned King Graham travels to Kolyma to find a bride to become his queen, after seeing an image of her trapped in a tower in his magic mirror. However, the adventures of Graham in Kolyma, as well as the backstories of the characters found there, are greatly expanded and changed when needed. Some new characters are added to the game as well, such as Daventry's new prime minister, Gervain, who is the one that suggests Graham to look outside of Daventry for a bride. The character of The Father is also introduced; he is the leader of the Black Cloak Society, a group of evil mages, wizards, and the nemesis of Graham, but his role is not revealed in full. While in Kolyma, Graham must overcome the Black Cloak Society, stop the witch Hagatha and The Father, and save both kingdoms. Other plot points that are changed include "Dracula" now being "Caldaur", a character who redeems himself with Graham's help; and the "Monk" now being "Llowh'wof", the leader of a werewolf clan who plots to keep Kolyma trapped in a dark age. By the end of the game, Graham learns that Gervain is really The Father, who had planted the image in the mirror, to lead Graham to Kolyma in an attempt to kill him there. This was done in hopes of him becoming the new King of Daventry, as he was the next in line to the throne, in order to search for a powerful artifact called "The Item".

The game also contains references to Graham's past and future. This includes his dilemmas and thoughts during King's Quest III: To Heir Is Human, when his infant boy had been lost, his daughter had been abducted and Daventry was being ravaged by the three-headed Dragon. Also notable is the appearance of Connor from King's Quest: Mask of Eternity, when he is meeting King Graham for the first time.

== AGD Interactive development ==
King's Quest II was unofficially remade in 2002 when AGD Interactive, then known as Tierra Entertainment, released the fan-made King's Quest II: Romancing the Stones under a fan license by Vivendi. The game uses a point-and-click interface functionally identical to an advanced SCI game engine, VGA graphics and digital sound, including full speech for all characters. Notably for an unofficial, fan-made project, the game's protagonist King Graham is voiced by Josh Mandel, who also voiced the part in Sierra's official CD-ROM full-speech versions of King's Quest V and VI. In contrast to the group's remake of King's Quest I, a content-wise identical presentation upgrade, King's Quest II VGA redesigns the original game to adding a rewritten plot expanding on the 1985 version, a number of puzzles, new characters and locations including a town, and references to future King's Quest games.

In March 2009, AGD Interactive released version 3.0 of this game. This version showcases redrawn backgrounds and dialogue pictures; the voice-acting was also dramatically improved and, thanks to fan feedback, many problems were attended to.

King's Quest II: Romancing the Stones was meant to be a "retelling" of the game, as a form of fan fiction. One of AGDI's developers mentioned on the forums they would probably have kept the game closer to the original if they had known Vivendi was going to grant them official permission, so people wouldn't think they were trying to create an alternative canon. He said he was personally happy that that didn't happen.

== Geography ==
- Kolyma: This is a forested nation once ruled by the Counts of Kolyma and is the main setting for the game. The Wierwood Forest and the swamp shadow the kingdom, and the Kolyma Town lies to the north. The ocean borders the kingdom to the west, and tall mountain range raises above the land to the east. Most of the kingdom has fallen into ruin, and is secretly controlled by the Black Cloak Society, by the likes of the witch Hagatha, and to a lesser extent the last of the counts, Caldaur. The evil Brotherhood of the Pack control much of the eastern edges of the kingdom within the dark sections of the Wierwood Forest with plans to increase their rule by taking over the entire nation.
- Neptune's Kingdom: The underwater kingdom ruled by King Neptune, that lies just off the coast of Kolyma. It lies between Kolyma and the depths of the Underwater Realm of the Sharkees. It is an exotic land with a shining underwater city. King Neptune lives in the grand palace.
- Underwater Realm of the Sharkees: The Sharkee's Realm is a dark underwater realm in the depths of the sea. It lies adjacent to Neptune's Kingdom, but at a much deeper depth. Sharkee and sharks patrol the waters. This is a realm with sunken ships. Most of the light that reaches this depth comes from strange glowing fish, that feed off the few bits of sea weed that try to survive in the depths. The King of the Sharkees rules from their dark fortress on the western edge of the realm.
- Tower Realm: The tower realm is an enchanted realm kept inside of a small snow globe on a table in Hagatha's cave. The pocket realm consists of a couple of islands in the center where the quartz tower is located. In this world there is no sun, as the only light shines in from the cave outside, making the sky appear brilliant orange. If one can ascend high enough, the sky can be touched. There is no wind in the surreal world. There is a tranquil magenta-colored sea, fed by magenta waterfalls. The magenta sea's calm hides the swift undercurrents at work there. A land of blue cliffs circles around the edge of the snow globe. In the center of the world is the Enchanted Island. The island is made of quartz rocks and topaz sand. Strange multi-colored palm trees dot the landscape. The only way out of the realm is through a magical portal on a smaller island of the coast of the island.

== Characters ==
KQ2 includes many new characters, and in some cases characters from the original were replaced with new characters. Two characters from the original were cut entirely (a fairy and a genie):

- Graham: Graham is the new king of Daventry. He recently took the throne, but he finds the job a lonely one, and is looking for a Queen to share it with. While there are many lovely maidens in the kingdom, none interest him. After viewing a lovely maiden in the Magic Mirror, he leaves the kingdom in the hands of Gervain, and travels to Kolyma to rescue her. While there, he must avoid being killed by the Black Cloak Society. His voice was reprised by Josh Mandel (the developer/producer of King's Quest I: Quest for the Crown remake) who did the voice of King Graham and other assorted voices in King's Quest V and King's Quest VI.
- The Father/Gervain: The infamous Black Cloak Society is led by a mysterious being known as "The Father". His true identity is unknown, but he's well informed about what's going on in Daventry. He is looking for a certain artifact known only as "The Item" to become powerful beyond imagination and in order for him to obtain it, he must possess the crown of Daventry. The only other thing that is known about him is the fact that he's already more than thousand years old. Documents spread throughout the game reveal that he was once Morgeilen, the brother of Legenimor, the first King of Daventry. To begin his search, he earned King Graham's trust by posing as "Gervain", and he becomes prime minister and chief of security shortly into Graham's reign. He runs Daventry while Graham is off questing. Gervain is based on a character mentioned in the background story in the manual of the original game and in the King's Quest Companion (and was actually named "Gerwain"), but never appeared in the original game itself.
- Caldaur: The vampire lord of Kolyma and member of the Black Cloak Society. The character is a reversal of the Count Dracula character who appeared in Sierra's original game; rather than being an outright villain, Caldaur begins as an antagonist but comes to aid Graham in his quest after the King helps Caldaur reunite with his beloved wife Lavidia. He will give Graham the Death (Dark) Gem for retrieving a tiara for his wife. At the end of the game, Caldaur re-accepts his role as ruler of Kolyma, and officiates Graham and Valanice's wedding.
- Hagatha: Hagatha is the primary antagonist of the game, an evil witch who jealously imprisoned any woman considered more beautiful than herself in the Quartz Tower in the enchanted realm. In addition to keeping Valanice (her latest victim) locked away, she is under orders from the Father to kill Graham while he's away from Daventry. She is the sister of Manannan and Mordack from other games in the KQ series.
- Lavidia (Grandmother): The wife of Caldaur and grandmother of Possum. She lives in a small house near the shoreline and repays Graham's kindness in looking after her granddaughter. As she nears the end of her life, Caldaur later turns her into a vampire, and she convinces her husband to help the king.
- Possum/Anastasia: The granddaughter of Caldaur, she goes by the nickname "Possum", but her real name is Anastasia. She lives with her grandmother Lavidia in a small house by the sea in Kolyma. Her basket was lost in the woods, which Graham helps her find. Later, Graham helps her again by retrieving chicken soup stolen by the dwarf. Sensing that they are endangered, her grandfather Caldaur "rescues" them bringing them back to his castle, transforming them into vampires, and Anastasia transforms into a young adult of a vampire. She helps Graham out by helping him find a book in the castle library.
- Angelina: The owner of the antique shop is based on the stereotypical little old lady Milvia from the original, whose only companion in life was a nightingale named Precious. When dealing with her at first, the player is given the impression that not much has changed. Angelina's role is altered quite a bit in this game's story, however: she dabbles in the dark arts and knows Hagatha quite well. When Hagatha develops a recipe for a youth potion with the use of the only known nightingale in Kolyma, Angelina has Graham steal it for her in exchange for a magic lamp. In retribution, Hagatha kills Angelina, also telling her that her invitation to join the Black Cloak Society was revoked.
- Baby Pumpkin: A young talking pumpkin who was kidnapped by the merchant (claiming to be a horticulturist); Graham must rescue it to receive aid from the Mama Pumpkin.
- Mama Pumpkin: A talking pumpkin (with a voice resembling Edith Bunker from All in the Family). One of her eight babies was stolen by a greedy merchant, and she helps Graham as thanks for his returning the baby.
- Valanice: The object of Graham's affections, a beautiful and clever young woman who is the latest victim of Hagatha's jealousy. She discovered that through her sleep she could watch Graham's quest, and in seeing his devotion to saving her came to love him before they ever met face-to-face.
- Door of Destiny: This mysterious door is actually an ancient being who was imprisoned in a mountain by his fellow "Ancients" because he abused his power. The only way for him to find rest is to learn about the balance of nature and the order of life and in order to do so he needs to obtain the gems of nature, which were created for that very purpose. In the original, there were actually three "ordinary" doors standing in the middle of nowhere. Each of these doors had an inscription with clues on how to find the golden key needed to unlock it.
- Edward: Edward was the former king of Daventry as seen in KQ1 VGA. His spirit appears at Graham's royal wedding in Castle Kolyma to wish him a long and fulfilled life.
- Cloud Spirit: This wise spirit resides high in the air and has the ability to judge the worthiness of those who appear before him. The tests he gives Graham test his spirit. The tests will certainly be very interesting for those who played certain other King’s Quest games. If Graham is judged worthy, he will entrust him with the Growth (Air) Gem.
- Malvolio: He is the childhood friend of King Graham. He was a little trouble maker, who liked to play bat and ball with Graham in the castle garden. He appears as part of the first test of the Cloud Spirit.
- Connor: Mask of Eternity’s protagonist presents another choice for Graham. Connor earned his title as first knight, but being the protector of the mask, he may not be around when Daventry needs him most. Connor believes that he can attend to both responsibilities, but the final word will be spoken by the player. He appears as the final test of the Cloud Spirit. In related information given on AGD Interactives website, this character is given the name "Connor MacLyrr", a prototype name given for the character during MOE's development, but dropped in the final release.
- Merchant: This person is the living representation of the stereotypical con artist. He talks with a fake Indian accent (accidentally dropping it a few times) and sells overpriced junk he calls valuable and obtained by less-than-honest means. However, Graham can take advantage of his greed in order to get the best of him.
- Mermaid: A mermaid, she is a good-natured but shy and easily frightened mermaid. In return for the hair comb, she gives Graham the ability to breathe underwater and a giant sea-horse to ride. She does not speak and does not understand Graham when he tries to talk to her.
- Neptune: The king of the Merpeople, Neptune is a good-willed leader whose magical trident was stolen by the king of the Sharkees. In return for retrieving the trident, he gives Graham the Birth (Water) Gem and information about where he can find the other two Gems.
- Ferryman: The Ferryman was once a human who ferried people across the lake when his master was alive, the very lake he died in. He is smart, and cannot be fooled by a simple thing like a ruby ring and a cloak. In the original game, he is explicitly stated to be Charon, the ferryman of the dead in Greek mythology.
- Sharkee King: The king of the Sharkees is a fierce and cruel person, but his ability to solve riddles could use some improvement. He's the typical warlord with a taste for blood and more brawn than brains. He misunderstands the enchantment on Neptune's trident, which can only be used by those of "good will", and can't comprehend why he can't use it despite the fact that his will is unshakable (he's completely ruthless and merciless).
- Town Librarian: She's a grumpy, snobby old woman whose way of thinking exceeds the term narrow-minded. Following all the petty rules to the letter, this person can be a major pain for any would-be member who tries to get access to the wealth of information stored in Kolyma's library.
- Lady Lillian and Lord Herbert: The parents of Anastasia. They were murdered by the Brotherhood of the Pack. They now haunt the graveyard of Kolyma Castle and guard the castle from intruders. Graham must appease them in order to find the crown tiara of Kolyma, and gain a wedding band for Valanice. His actions allow the spirits to find rest.
- Llowh'wof/Big Bad Wolf: He is a composite character based on Brother Fragola and The Wolf from the original King's Quest II. While Fragola was kindly and helpful, Llowh'wof is an antagonist who only helps Graham to further his own goals. He is the leader of the Brotherhood of the Pack, and wants to kill Caldaur for his progressive attitude, seeking to keep Kolyma stagnant. He and his pack confront Graham in the swamp, but Graham kills Llowh'wof with a poisoned silver needle.
  - Brotherhood of the Pack: A group of monks who some time ago learned the secret of shapeshifting and became werewolves. The magic apparently caused them to lose hold on their humanity, as Caldaur says they were good once, but now reflect poorly on all holy men. With the death of Llowh'wof, they become "as lost in mind as they now are in body", stranded in the poisoned swamp forever (though Caldaur does say that some day, he may choose to show them mercy and release them).
- Old Man: The old man was a former beau of Hagatha's. She cursed him turning him into a lion to guard the Tower Realm after his eyes started wandering after better-looking women.
- Enchanter: The enchanter lives in a magically furnished cave at the top of the mountains in Kolyma. This evil sorcerer is not the same person who appeared in King’s Quest I VGA (as King’s Quest I’s sorcerer is in the audience at the endgame). He is even more dangerous. Like he did in the original King’s Quest II, he appears in certain screens as a random "monster" and turns Graham into an animal if he catches him. Graham can find the enchanter's home on top of a mountain, and must create a powerful protection emerald. By waiting for the enchanter to appear in his home, the emerald will protect Graham from his spells and he can force the enchanter to leave Kolyma. In the lore of the official series, it was hinted that Enchanter and the Sorcerer are actually one and the same character.
- Disciple of the Cloud: He is a pegasus who serves the Cloud Spirit and cannot be commanded by any mortal being. When he refused to bow to the Enchanter, he was turned into a snake and used to guard the Enchanter's home. In gratitude for Graham restoring his original form and recovering his silver bridle, the Disciple takes Graham to meet with the Cloud Spirit.
- The Dwarf: This sneaky little pest is the same dwarf who already roamed Daventry's countryside in King’s Quest I. In the original King’s Quest II, he randomly appeared in pre-designated locations and attempted to steal Graham's riches. In this game, he has become an even bigger pest than he was before, stealing Grandma's chicken soup and sabotaging the rope bridge that leads to the Door of Destiny, forcing Graham to use quick thinking to thwart the thief. A trap with fool's gold is set south of his house, and he will kill Graham if he is caught by throwing his knife into his chest.
- Cedric: Originally from King's Quest V, Cedric appears as an Easter egg if the player makes the right choices in the Cloud Spirit's trial. In this silly sequence, he arrives to Connor's coronation at the end of Mask of Eternity, and Graham tasks Connor with slaying Cedric, whom he sees as the greatest monster in the land (a nod to the fandom's great dislike of the character). Cedric is voiced by Richard Aronson, who voiced the character in the CD-ROM version of King's Quest V.

== Version history ==
=== Tierra ===
- 1.1: This build fixed some small bugs and issues that had been reported in the first public release
- 2.0: Voice pack for Romancing the Stones was released on April 2, 2003, alongside another updated version of the game.

=== Romancing the Stones Enhanced Edition (AGD Interactive) ===
- 3.0: Released on March 14, 2009, this version includes the music and speech packs as part of the game download, as well as adding a plethora of touch-ups, enhancements, improvements, and many other new features to the game.
- 3.1a: Released on September 1, 2010, the first Apple Mac version. This build also addresses several minor bugs and oversights in all versions.
- 3.1b
- 3.1c (latest build)

== Reception ==
This game has received positive reception by the press. Games Radar had it listed as one of the top thirty free downloadable games.

== See also ==
- King's Quest III: To Heir Is Human (AGD Interactive)
- Quest for Glory II: Trial By Fire (AGD Interactive)
- Al Emmo and the Lost Dutchman's Mine
