= King's Quest III =

1986 video game

King's Quest III: To Heir Is Human
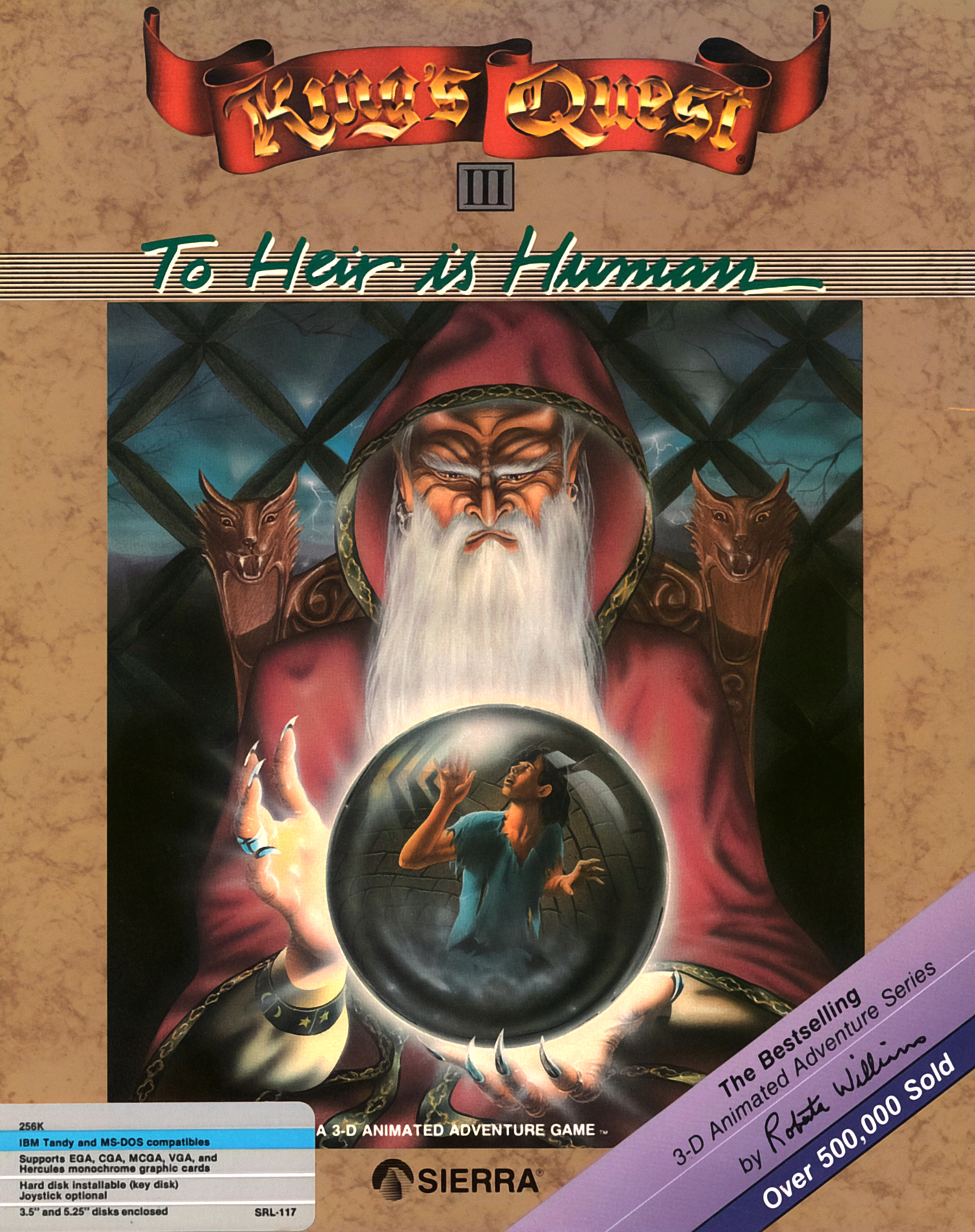
- Developer: Sierra On-Line
- Publisher: Sierra On-Line
- Designer: Roberta Williams
- Programmers: Al Lowe; Bob Heitman; Bob Kernaghan
- Artists: Doug MacNeill; Mark Crowe
- Writers: Roberta Williams; Annette Childs
- Composer: Margaret Lowe
- Series: King's Quest
- Engine: Adventure Game Interpreter
- Platforms: MS-DOS, Apple II, Apple IIGS, Amiga, Atari ST, Mac, Tandy Color Computer 3
- Release: November 1986
- Genre: Adventure
- Mode: Single-player

King's Quest III: To Heir is Human is an adventure game developed by Sierra On-Line and published originally for home computers in 1986 as the third entry in the King's Quest series. The game follows Gwydion, slave to the wizard Manannan, as he journeys through the pseudo-medieval fairy tale-inspired fantasy realm of Llewdor, on a quest to free himself and find his family. It is presented as an interconnected set of locations, or flip-screens, with a pseudo-3D art style. The player interacts with locations and items using text commands, and must avoid numerous hazards and obstacles in their quest.

King's Quest III was developed by Sierra using an expanded version of the game engine that was originally developed for King's Quest I (1984), the Adventure Game Interpreter. It was designed by Sierra co-founder Roberta Williams as a blend of common fairy tales and fantasy tropes, with a more complex and mature story than its predecessors made possible by the increased capabilities of home computers. Several developers of the game, including artist Mark Crowe and programmer Al Lowe, would go on to develop future games for Sierra.

King's Quest III sold 250,000 copies by February 1993, and the first three King's Quest games collectively sold over 500,000 copies by 1987. Critics praised the advances in gameplay over the first two games, as well as the quality and variety of graphical animation, though some found elements of the game unfairly difficult. The game has been included in several compilation releases, and unofficial remakes were released in 2006 and 2011 for modern systems. The King's Quest series, which includes a further five games by Sierra, has been termed its flagship series.

== Gameplay ==
Gameplay screenshot; the player has entered "open gate" into the text input parser and the game time is at 15 minutes and 35 seconds.

King's Quest III is an adventure game set in the pseudo-medieval fairy tale-inspired fantasy realm of Llewdor, in which the player controls the character Gwydion to escape his enslavement to the wizard Manannan and find his family. The game world is divided into dozens of locations, or flip-screens, with one location visible at a time. These locations are presented in pseudo-3D as if viewed from the side, with the player moving Gwydion around the screen in front of and behind other elements of the location.

In addition to moving Gwydion, the player can interact with the objects, obstacles, and creatures within the location. This is done by entering text commands, which can be one or two words (e.g., "get stone") or more complex phrases (e.g., "use key on lock"). The allowable commands are contextual to where Gwydion is standing in the location; for example, "get stone" only has an effect if Gwydion is standing in a part of a screen where there is a stone present. Some locations have other characters which he can talk to or who may kill him. Gwydion can also die from numerous hazards in the game, such as drowning or falling; upon death, the player can reload the game from the last time they saved it.

In the first portion of the game, Gwydion is periodically given tasks by Manannan; if he does not complete each task within three real-time minutes he is punished for the first failure, and killed for the second. A visible in-game clock keeps track of time. Manannan will also kill Gwydion for forbidden actions, such as leaving his house or having Manannan's magical items in the player's inventory when Manannan is near. Periodically he will sleep or leave the house for 25 minutes, allowing the player the opportunity to explore; after a few such events, he kills Gwydion. Once Manannan is defeated, there are no time restrictions. There are several magic potions and items which can be created by combining items using steps and spells that are listed in the game's manual, but not in-game. Gwydion can also find a magic map which allows him to teleport to different areas in Llewdor once they have been reached by other means. There are additionally many items which can be obtained and put in the player's inventory; most are used to solve puzzles or unlock new locations.

== Plot ==
Gwydion is the 17-year-old slave of the wizard Manannan in the land of Llewdor, performing chores and tasks for him and barred from leaving his house. The game's manual explains that Manannan has had a series of slaves, kidnapped from elsewhere when young and then killed when they reach 18 years old or touch his magical items and potions. Gwydion is nearing his 18th birthday, and begins to explore the forbidden areas of the house as well as the nearby areas of Llewdor when Manannan is asleep or gone. He finds an oracle in a cave, who informs him that he is actually Prince Alexander of Daventry, kidnapped at a young age. The Kingdom of Daventry is under attack by a three-headed dragon, and his sister, Princess Rosella, will be sacrificed to it if Alexander does not rescue her.

Using Manannan's spellbook, Alexander creates a cookie that permanently turns the eater into a cat. He crumbles the cookie into a porridge that he then feeds to Manannan, freeing himself. He leaves Llewdor on a ship, but is captured when it turns out to be crewed by pirates. After escaping, he makes his way to the Kingdom of Daventry and finds the dragon menacing Rosella. After sneaking up on the dragon and defeating it using a brew that summons a lightning storm, Alexander frees Rosella and they return to Castle Daventry, where King Graham, the protagonist of the first two games, throws his adventuring hat to them in celebration.

== Development and release ==
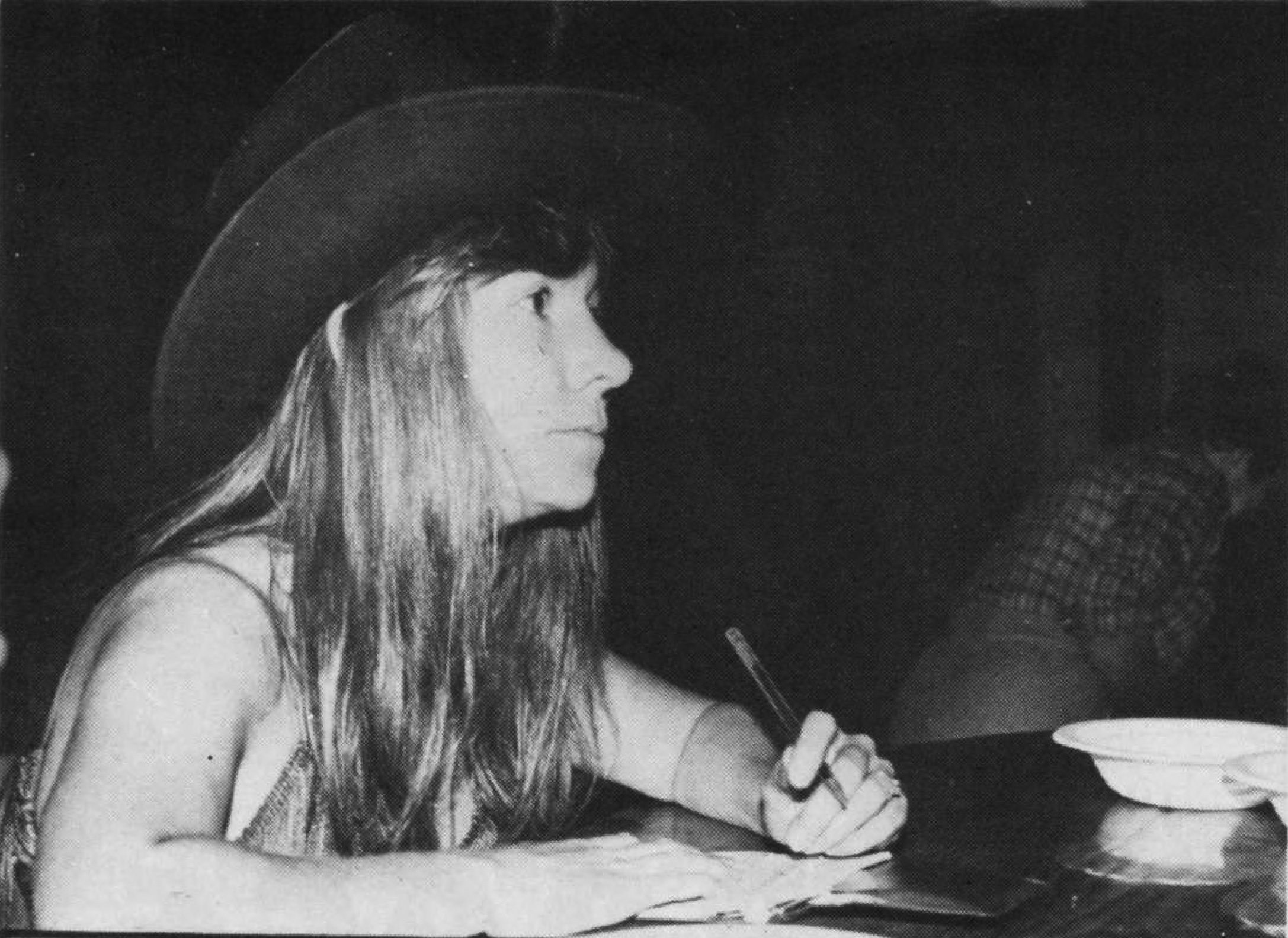
Roberta Williams in 1981

Sierra On-Line was founded in 1979 by Roberta and Ken Williams as On-Line Systems, and in 1984 released King's Quest, later termed King's Quest I, with Roberta Williams as the designer alongside a team of 6 programmers and artists. She made the game world as a blend of common fairy tales that could be directly experienced as a game. As part of the development of King's Quest I, Sierra developed an engine for the game to interpret and react to player inputs called the Adventure Game Interpreter (AGI) which could be reused for later titles. Sierra followed the game with King's Quest II in 1985 using the AGI engine, and after its release began working on a third AGI-based title in the series.

Sierra stated in 2015 that the core elements of a King's Quest game were family-friendly humor, fairy tale themes, cute characters, a clear story, and non-violent solutions to problems. The first two games had a less complex plot than Williams wanted, as she was stymied by the memory and space limitations of computers of the time, resulting in "treasure hunts with lots of simple goals [...] and fun puzzles". For King's Quest III, however, she relied less on fairy tale scenarios in an attempt to create a more "adult" story that was more of a "traditional fantasy role-playing game", though still included characters like Medusa and the three bears from "Goldilocks". In addition to Williams, the development team included Space Quest series designer Mark Crowe and future Leisure Suit Larry designer Al Lowe.

The parser was improved from the previous games to understand more words, and support was added for greater color depth with EGA graphics and 3½-inch floppy disk drives. The development process began with Williams drafting the story and puzzles of the game on paper, before the other developers then implemented that design. The artists then began by drawing the backgrounds for each of the locations in the game; these backgrounds were saved as a set of drawing instructions, rather than images, to save space. The instructions were made with a custom program used to scan in the artists' paper drawings, with the artist selecting lines or areas and setting their color and "priority", or how far in the foreground or background they are.

King's Quest III was first announced at the Winter Consumer Electronics Show in January 1986, with an intended release date of that September. It was published for IBM-compatible computers in November 1986, with versions for Apple II, Amiga, and Atari ST computers following in early 1987. Updated versions for models with more memory, such as the Apple IIGS, followed in 1988.

== Reception ==
King's Quest III sold 100,000 copies by the end of 1988, and 250,000 copies by February 1993. By mid-1987 the combined sales of the first three King's Quest games surpassed 500,000.

Reviews of the game were generally positive, and the gameplay was compared positively to the first two King's Quest games, though also considered more difficult. The reviewer from Tilt praised the size and variety of the game world, as did Nick Clarkson of ST Action. Tilt went on to say that it was the best of the three games, while Stephen Pietrowicz of Amazing Computer added that it was "more complex and much more satisfying", with a better parser. Rick Teverbaugh of Atari Explorer, conversely, while finding the game good compared to other titles, felt there was a lack of innovation in gameplay since King's Quest I. Sol and Rebecca Guber of Antic felt it was better than the first two, though also harder, which the reviewer from Computer Entertainer agreed with. Roy Wagner of Computer Gaming World, however, said that it was unfairly hard, with a few puzzles, particularly finding the magic map, nearly impossible to accomplish without purchasing a hint guide from Sierra, while the hardest part of the game was maneuvering Gwydion along the same winding paths repeatedly.

The graphics were highly praised by reviewers, and rated highly compared to previous King's Quest games as well as other games; Tilt praised the "superb 3D graphics" and "flawless animation", while Antic said it was like an animated cartoon. Computer Gaming World said that the animation and 3D world was as impressive as it was when the series began, and Computer Entertainer said that it was beautiful and captivating. Computer Entertainer went on to say that the added animation elevated it over the previous two titles, particularly one room with a mirror, which Antic also called out when praising the improvement in graphics. Amazing Computer said that the use of animation was more impressive than the first two games, while Atari Explorer concluded that it had some of the best graphics of any game available at the time.

== Legacy ==
In August 2016, King's Quest III placed 50th on Time's "The 50 Best Video Games of All Time" list. The King's Quest series, which has been described as Sierra's "flagship series", includes a further five games by Sierra, beginning with King's Quest IV in 1988 and concluding with King's Quest: Mask of Eternity in 1998. King's Quest III has been released in several collections of games in the series in the 1990s and 2000s. It is also included in the modern King's Quest Collection on Steam and the King's Quest 1+2+3 collection released on GOG.

Sierra later stated that feedback from players indicated confusion about why the game had a protagonist that did not appear connected to previous games, as well as that the magic map reduced the challenge of traversing the game too much, and so it was not reused for future games. In 1988, after the release of King's Quest IV, Silicon Valley Books published The King's Quest Companion, a combination hint guide and novelization by Peter Spear of the games in the series. Updated editions were released through 1997 as further games were released in the series.

In 2006, Infamous Adventures released an unofficial remake of the game as King's Quest III, adding a point-and-click control system from later King's Quest games wherein the player selects preset actions, represented by pictures, and then selects the subject, rather than typing. It also added high-resolution full color graphics and voice acting. In 2011, AGD Interactive, which had previously produced remakes of King's Quest I and II, released another remake of the game, titled King's Quest III Redux, with an expanded plot, and also added a point-and-click control system, high-resolution full color graphics, and voice acting, including by Josh Mandel, the voice actor for King Graham in King's Quest V and VI. Elements of the original game were incorporated into the fourth chapter of King's Quest (2015), "Snow Place Like Home", an episodic re-imagining of the series developed by The Odd Gentlemen and published by Activision under the Sierra Entertainment brand name for Microsoft Windows, PlayStation 3, PlayStation 4, Xbox 360 and Xbox One.

== Sources ==
- Mills, Shawn (2020). The Sierra Adventure: The Story of Sierra On-Line. ISBN 978-1-71675-872-0.
- Spear, Peter (1997). The King's Quest Companion (4th ed.). Osborne/McGraw-Hill. ISBN 978-0-07-882401-2.
- Trivette, Donald B. (1991). The Official Book of King's Quest: Daventry and Beyond (PDF) (2nd ed.). Compute! Books. ISBN 0-87455-245-1.
