= Callahan's Lady =

1989 science fiction novel by Spider Robinson

- First edition
- Author: Spider Robinson
- Cover artist: James Warhola
- Language: English
- Genre: Science fiction novel
- Publisher: Ace Books
- Publication date: May 1, 1989
- Publication place: United States
- Media type: Print (hardcover)
- Pages: 191
- ISBN: 0-441-09073-7
- OCLC: 18414111
- Dewey Decimal: 813/.54 19
- LC Class: PS3568.O3156 C35 1989
- Followed by: Lady Slings the Booze

Callahan's Lady (1989) is a science fiction novel by American writer Spider Robinson, the fourth in his Callahan's Crosstime Saloon series. It is made up of four parts, all revolving around a bar and brothel owned by Lady Sally McGee, wife of Mike Callahan. The stories are written in the same fast-paced, pun-laced prose Robinson is noted for.

== Plot ==
The storyline focuses on Maureen, an underage streetwalker who is stabbed by her pimp in a dark alley one night. Fortunately for Maureen, Lady Sally is nearby: she had been walking her werebeagle. After defeating the pimp in hand-to-hand combat, Sally brings Maureen home. Her brothel has a fully functioning medical facility, where Maureen is treated and healed.

She falls in love with the place for its ambiance and safety but is rejected as an employee for many reasons. Most importantly, she is underage but she also has severe self-loathing issues. Lady Sally enjoys the fact that Maureen comes to accept and befriend the werebeagle and a talking German Shepherd but this is not enough let the main character stay.

Maureen's old pimp tracks down the brothel and puts many of the visitors in danger. Maureen uses her wits to help defeat the man; this convinces Sally to let her stay in a non-sexual context. The plot skips to Maureen becoming eighteen, she is allowed to take on sexual duties.

The rest of the plot focuses on three different subsequent incidents. There is 'Colt', a client with an unusual addiction that nobody seems to notice, one that presents various threats. Later, Maureen and her close friend Phillip swiftly realize that they are doing many things they do not wish to do over the course of their work-day. The concept of 'being forced into it' is something that Lady Callahan and her staff oppose in many, varied ways. Maureen and Phillip find that they are keeping quiet about this, even though they wish to tell everyone possible.

The last incident focuses on Maureen's old friend, the Professor, who needs fifty thousand quick or he will die horribly. A very specific, very counterfeit fifty thousand.
