= Infamous Quests =

Independent video game developer

Infamous Quests LLC
- Company type: Private
- Founded: 2012
- Headquarters: Syracuse, NY, United States
- Key people: Steven Alexander, Shawn Mills, James Broom
- Products: Quest for Infamy; Order of Thorne
- Website: www.infamous-quests.com

Infamous Quests is an independent video game developer, known for developing adventure games. It was founded in 2012 by Steven Alexander and Shawn Mills who previously founded Infamous Adventures, an amateur game development company that remade old Sierra Entertainment adventure games of the early 1990s. The two chose to form Infamous Quests in order to separate it from their free fan-remake development company and in 2012 they announced Quest for Infamy, an adventure RPG made with Adventure Game Studio where the player assumes the role of the morally gray William Roehm. The developers raised $63,281 on Kickstarter to produce Quest For Infamy, and in June 2014 the game made Time Magazine's 20 Video Games To Watch for Summer 2014 list.

Quest for Infamy was released in 2014 and in March 2015 the company announced two new game titles, Order of the Thorne: The King's Challenge, a point and click adventure game that is the first in a planned anthology series of games, and a prequel to Quest for Infamy, titled Quest for Infamy: Roehm to Ruin.

== Quest for Infamy ==
Quest for Infamy is a point and click adventure RPG created for Windows, Mac OS X and Linux, inspired by Sierra's Quest for Glory series. Gameplay revolves around the player assuming the role of one of three anti-heroes, a brigand, rogue, or sorcerer. Reception for the game has been mixed to positive. Quest for Infamy was released on July 7, 2014, for commercial distribution through Steam, publisher Phoenix Online Studios, and GOG.com.

It was nominated for the 2014 Indie Game of the Year at IndieDB, where it was one of the top 100 nominations. The game received several nominations at the AGS Awards, winning 4 awards including Best Character Lead, Best Puzzles, Best Music & Sounds and Best Gameplay. It was also nominated for Best Writing (Comedy) at the Aggie Awards at Adventure Gamers.

== Order of the Thorne and Roehm to Ruin ==
Following the announcement of their existence in March 2015, Infamous Quests launched a Kickstarter campaign to fund the completion of the two titles. On May 3, 2015, the campaign succeeded, bringing the team $30,944 plus additional funds via PayPal, allowing them to announce a third game, Order of the Thorne: Fortress of Fire as well as the two promised by the initial campaign pitch. Order of the Thorne: The King's Challenge was released early in 2016, delivering on the first title committed to by the crowd-funding campaign.
