= Freddy Pharkas: Frontier Pharmacist =

1993 video game

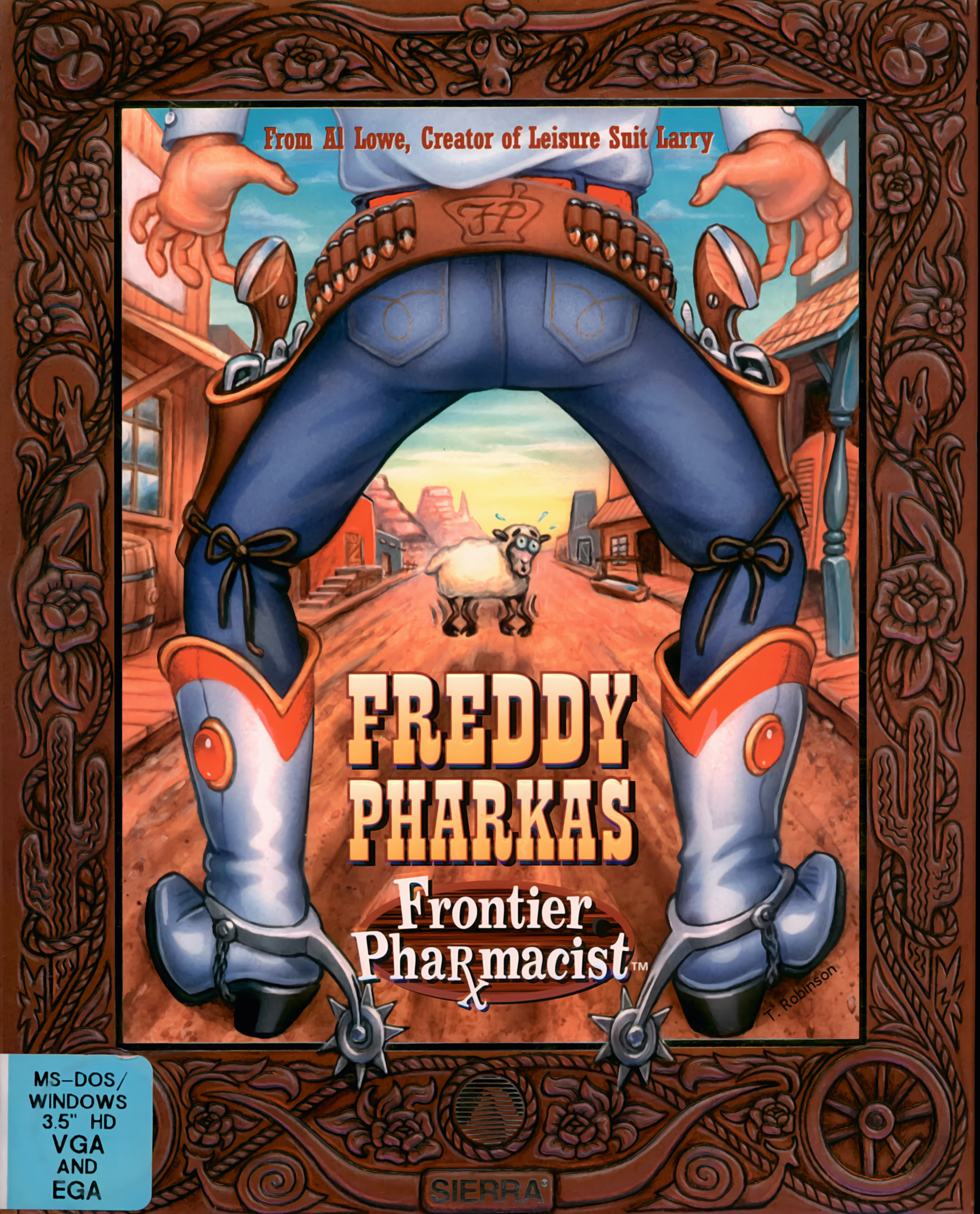
- Developer: Sierra On-Line
- Publisher: Sierra On-Line
- Director: Josh Mandel
- Producer: Josh Mandel
- Designers: Al Lowe; Josh Mandel
- Programmers: Steve Conrad; William R. Shockley; Cynthia L. Swafford
- Artists: Bob Gleason; Ruben Huante; Phy Williams; Karin Ann Young
- Composer: Aubrey Hodges
- Engine: Sierra Creative Interpreter
- Platforms: MS-DOS, Classic Mac OS, Windows 3.x
- Release: 1993 (floppy); 1994 (CD-ROM)
- Genre: Adventure
- Mode: Single-player

Freddy Pharkas: Frontier Pharmacist is a point-and-click adventure game developed and published by Sierra On-Line. It was released in 1993 for MS-DOS, Classic Mac OS, and Windows 3.x. Designed by Al Lowe and Josh Mandel, the game sees the player controlling Freddy Pharkas, a former gunman turned pharmacist, as he runs his pharmacy and solves other problems around the town of Coarsegold, California.

== Gameplay ==
The game uses Sierra's SCI1.1 engine and features 256-color hand-drawn art, scaling sprites, and a point-and-click interface. Freddy Pharkas runs under both MS-DOS and Windows 3.1. It was released in both floppy disk and CD-ROM versions, the latter having full voiceover speech for all characters. The game's manual is entitled The Modern Day Book of Health and Hygiene, a parody of 19th century medical texts. It contains information necessary for solving prescription puzzles.

As a form of copy protection, the player must concoct prescriptions for Freddy's patients using recipes found in the user's manual. An incorrect prescription will result in the customer returning angrily, but does not end the game.

== Plot ==
In the game, the player takes the role of Freddy Pharkas, an 1880s-era pharmacist in the town of Coarsegold, California which was the location of Sierra's headquarters in 1993. Freddy was once a gunslinger, but sought a new career after his last gunfight, in which "Kenny the Kid" (a reference to the infamous outlaw Billy the Kid) shot off one of his ears. Throughout the town, businesses are either being bought or proprietors are being scared out of town. Someone is obviously trying to take over the entire area, but who? And why? The slimy sheriff, Checkum P. Shift doesn't seem eager to help, so it's up to Freddy to find out the details. The cast includes the town's eccentric old man and story narrator Whittlin' Willy, Srini (Freddy's "Injun" sidekick – actually East Indian), Doc "Dizzy" Gillespie the drunken town doctor, the cafe owner Helen Back, otherwise known as Mom and her stereotypical Chinese chef Hopalong Singh (a reference to Hop Sing, the cook on Bonanza), the crooked banker Phineas (P.H.) Balance, town schoolmarm (and Freddy's love interest) Penelope Primm, and Madame Ovaree, who runs the local brothel. The villain "Kenny the Kid" is a cartoonish version of Sierra's then-president Ken Williams. Madame Ovaree's name is an obvious parody of Madame Bovary and (as evidenced by her occupation) ovaries. Also, there are some anachronisms in the game, such as Srini mentioning him being on Pakistani time, but Pakistan did not exist at the time the game is set, as the region where the country is located was still a part of India at that time, and Pakistan did not become a country until 1947, 67 years after the game's setting.

Freddy must take part in numerous tasks such as mixing the right amount of chemicals to create the requested prescription remedy and lab equipment. He also must deal with various dilemmas taking part in town such as a gas leak a.k.a. all the town's horses with explosive flatulence, a snail stampede, a diarrhea epidemic and an abandoned building fire that might spread through the entire town. He must use found objects and pharmaceutical skills to solve these problems.

Eventually, he regains his gunslinger status and apprehends a poker cheater and neutralizes a group of rowdy cowhands with a canister of laughing gas. Soon, he is confronted by Kenny the Kid and in the ensuring duel, has his remaining ear shot off. Assuming that Freddy would soon die of blood loss, Kenny reveals his affiliation with Penelope Primm, the one who was attempting to buy out Coarsegold for the oil rights. Freddy staunches the bleeding and recovers enough strength to enter the schoolhouse, only to find Penelope packing up. Penelope shows her true colors by aiming a Derringer at Freddy and ordering him to drop his gun holsters. Freddy complies, only to grab a slate to block the bullet that Penelope fires. Penelope then responds by throwing her gun at Freddy, knocking him out, and tying him in the basement and setting it on fire. Freddy escapes the basement and confronts Penelope in a sword fight. Freddy prevails but Kenny reappears and realizes Freddy's true identity, only to be killed when Freddy tosses his sharpened silver ear at his throat. Freddy then leaps out of the schoolhouse before it, along with Penelope, is consumed by an explosion from the fire set in the basement. In the game's dénouement, both Whittlin' Willy and the closing song pointedly mention that Penelope's body was never found.

== Voice cast ==
- Cam Clarke as Freddy Pharkas
- Lewis Arquette as Whittlin' Willie / P. H. Balance
- Bill Bryant as Doc Gillespie
- Michael Gough as Kenny the Kid / Salvatore O'Hanrahan
- Nicholas Guest as Srini / Hop Singh
- Jocko Marcellino as Smithie
- Richard Paul as Chester Field / Sheriff Shift
- Jan Rabson as Sam Andreas / Wheaton Hall / Zircon Jim Laffer
- Neil Ross as The Narrator
- Susan Silo as Helen Back / Madame Ovaree
- Kath Soucie as Penelope Primm

== Development ==
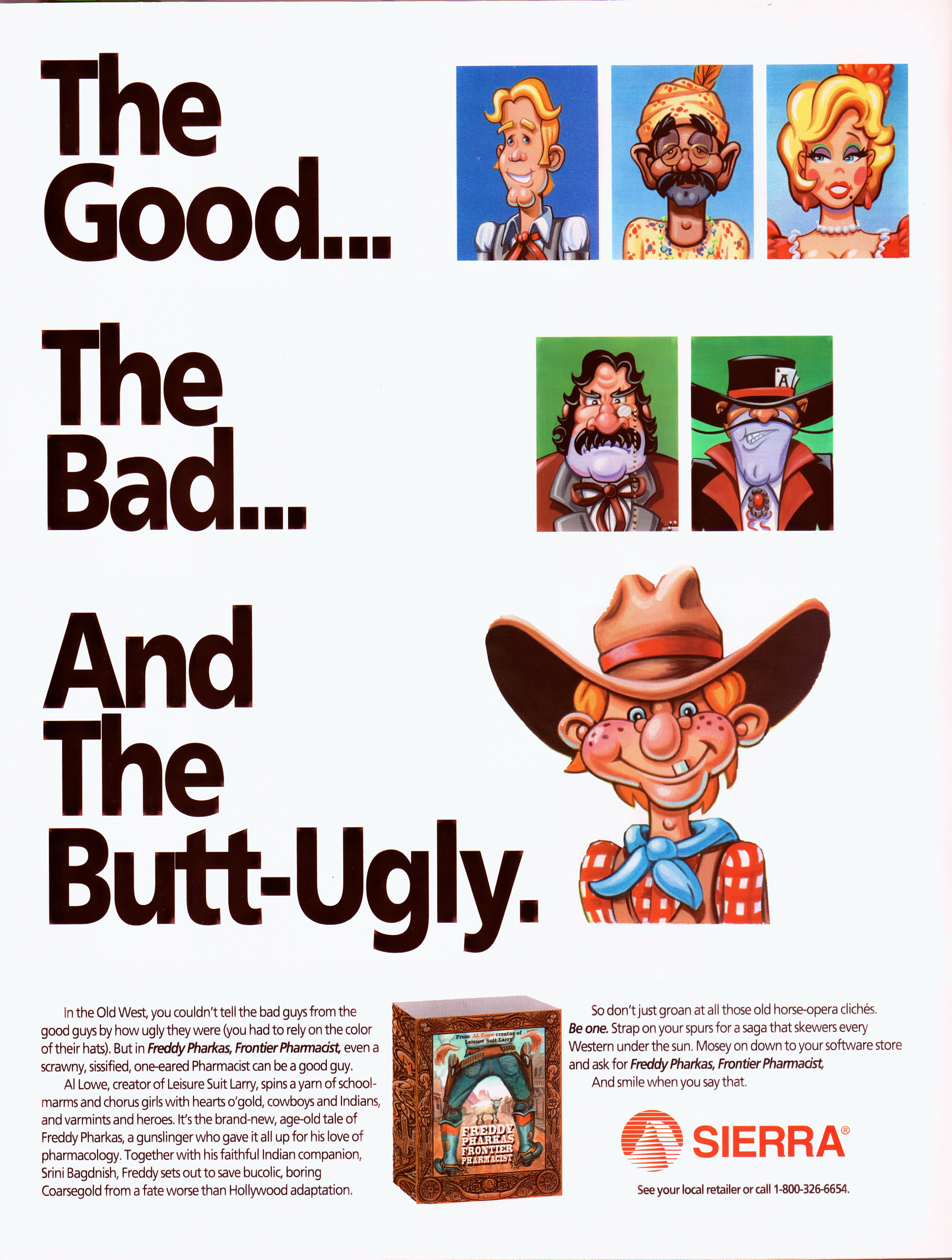
Launch advertisement for Freddy Pharkas (1993)

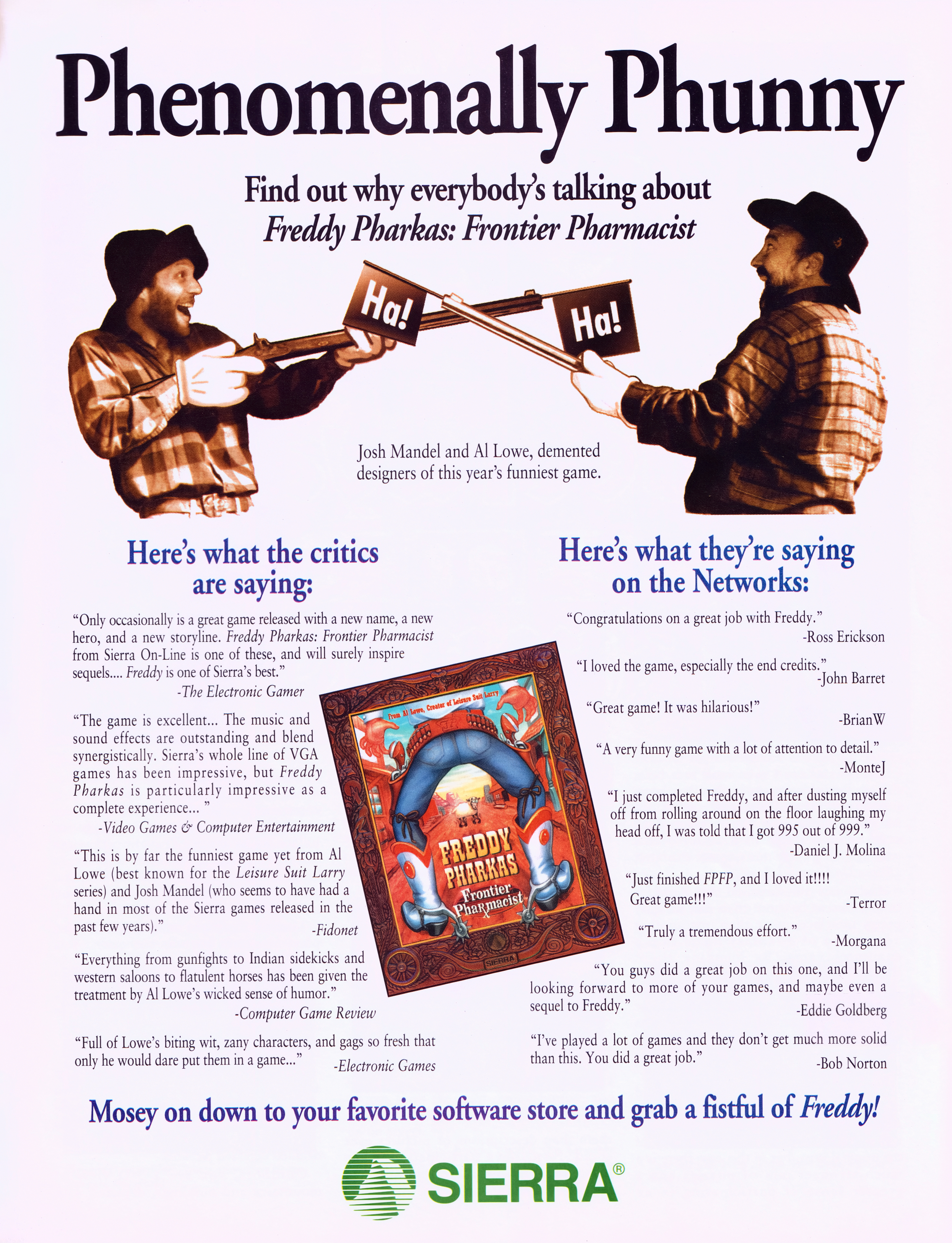
Sierra promotional ad highlighting critical praise for the game's humor and its designers, Al Lowe and Josh Mandel (1993)

In 1992, veteran designer Al Lowe conceived Freddy Pharkas: Frontier Pharmacist as a humorous Old West adventure game. Lowe later recalled that at the time “there wasn't a single Western computer game” on the market, and he wanted to spoof the genre. The pharmacist protagonist emerged from a brainstorming session with Roberta Williams, where Lowe accidentally coined the word "farmer-cist," inspiring the title character. Lowe cited Blazing Saddles as a major inspiration.

Lowe co-designed and wrote the game with Josh Mandel, a fellow Sierra writer known for his work on the Space Quest series. Lowe praised Mandel's wit and described him as a major contributor to the game’s humor and tone. The two also collaborated on the music and lyrics, including the comedic ballad that opens the game. The printed game manual, titled The Modern Day Book of Health and Hygiene, was designed as a parody of 1880s medical almanacs and doubled as a form of copy protection.

The game was developed at Sierra On-Line’s Oakhurst studio during 1992–93, using the SCI1.1 engine. It supported 256-color VGA graphics, scaling character sprites, and a point-and-click interface compatible with both MS-DOS and Windows 3.1. Mandel served as director, producer, and lead writer on the floppy disk release, which shipped in mid-1993. Reviews at the time described the game as “the Blazing Saddles of computer games.”

Strong sales of the floppy version prompted Sierra to greenlight a CD-ROM version with voice acting. By then, Mandel had left to work on Space Quest 6, so Lowe directed the voiceover production. He ultimately decided to cut about 15% of the game's original text, especially inventory descriptions, because he was weary from the length of studio sessions. As Mandel later noted, the abridged recording led to the loss of many jokes, narrative cues, and puzzle hints.

The CD-ROM edition, released in 1994, featured professional voice acting, with Cam Clarke voicing Freddy and Lowe performing the musical ballads. Some ad-libbing by actors resulted in differences between the spoken lines and the original script. Although the narrator's witty observations were reduced in the CD version, the added audio gave the game broader appeal.

The game’s commercial performance was solid, though not immediately recognized within Sierra as a hit. Lowe stated that it sold more than 150,000 copies in its first year and eventually exceeded 500,000 total sales, bolstered by the CD-ROM re-release. Despite those numbers, Lowe remarked that Freddy Pharkas had a “reputation as a failure” at the company, likely because it took several years to reach its sales peak and did not spawn a sequel.

Testing and feedback were crucial to polishing the final release. Sierra’s internal QA team and volunteer beta testers played an active role. Notably, future journalist and presenter Geoff Keighley was one of the teenage testers on the game. He later recalled it as one of his earliest roles in the gaming industry.

== Reception ==
Reception

Review score
Publication	Score
Computer Game Review	86%

Charles Ardai praised the game in Computer Gaming World in 1993, stating that "Freddy Pharkas is the Blazing Saddles of computer games", with better humor and puzzles than the Leisure Suit Larry series and which "can make a jaded player laugh out loud frequently". He wrote that although "satirizing the Wild West is by no means a new idea", the developers "manage to find new jokes to crack and new ways to crack old ones ... never runs out of material", including satires of other computer games, both Sierra's and others'. Game Informer in September 2006 called it one of the best adventure games of all time, and gave it a Retro Review score of 9.0.

According to Al Lowe, Freddy Pharkas "sold well into six figures." However, he noted that the game and Torin's Passage "had a reputation as failures at Sierra". He explained that the game sold over 150,000 after roughly a year, which inspired the team to re-release it on CD-ROM. This new edition "sold well for two years", and drove the game's lifetime sales to 500,000 copies. Lowe remarked, "It turned out to be quite a successful game and probably should've had a sequel, but because it took three years to get those big numbers, Josh had moved on by then and other things had happened, so it fell through the cracks."

In 2011, Adventure Gamers named Freddy Pharkas the 78th-best adventure game ever released.
