= Josh Mandel (video game designer) =

American video game designer

- Born: October 9, 1958 (age 67); Queens, New York
- Occupations: Video game designer, writer, voice actor, producer
- Known for: King's Quest V The Dagger of Amon Ra; Freddy Pharkas; Space Quest 6 Callahan's Crosstime Saloon

Josh Mandel (born October 9, 1958) is an American video game writer, designer, voice actor, and producer. He worked on computer games such as King's Quest V, The Dagger of Amon Ra, Freddy Pharkas: Frontier Pharmacist, Space Quest 6, and Callahan's Crosstime Saloon.

== Sierra Entertainment ==
Josh Mandel joined Sierra Entertainment in 1990. He was the first person to play the voice of King Graham, the hero of the King's Quest series. He also played Shamir Shamazel in King's Quest VI, Steve Dorian in The Dagger of Amon Ra, and numerous other minor roles.

In 2001, Mandel reprised the role of King Graham for the unofficial fan-made remakes King's Quest I, King's Quest II: Romancing the Stones, and King's Quest III Redux by AGD Interactive and King's Quest III by Infamous Adventures.

== Post Sierra ==
From 2012 to 2013, Mandel was employed with Replay Games where he, in cooperation with Sierra veteran Al Lowe, worked as a designer and writer on Leisure Suit Larry: Reloaded and Fester Mudd: Curse of the Gold He quit the company some time after the release of Reloaded.

In January 2014, he contributed to the independent adventure game, Serena, wherein he voices the game's protagonist.

In February 2016, Mandel began working for another Sierra veteran, Corey Cole on Hero-U, a new adventure roleplaying game.

== Games ==
Name	Year	Credited with	Publisher
Zeliard (English version, DOS)	1990	producer	Sierra On-Line
King's Quest I: Quest for the Crown	1990	producer	Sierra On-Line
Fire Hawk: Thexder - The Second Contact (DOS)	1990	producer	Sierra On-Line
Mixed-Up Mother Goose (SCI0/SCI1)	1990/1991	producer, voice actor (CD-ROM)	Sierra On-Line
Jones in the Fast Lane	1991	writer, voice actor (CD-ROM)	Sierra On-Line
Space Quest IV: Roger Wilco and the Time Rippers	1991	additional material, voice actor (CD-ROM)	Sierra On-Line
King's Quest V: Absence Makes the Heart Go Yonder! (CD-ROM)	1992	voice actor	Sierra On-Line
EcoQuest: The Search for Cetus (CD-ROM)	1992	voice actor	Sierra On-Line
The Dagger of Amon Ra	1992	writer, voice actor (CD-ROM)	Sierra On-Line
Freddy Pharkas: Frontier Pharmacist	1993	director, producer, designer, writer	Sierra On-Line
Hoyle Classic Card Games	1993	voice actor	Sierra On-Line
King's Quest VI: Heir Today, Gone Tomorrow (CD-ROM)	1993	voice actor	Sierra On-Line
Pepper's Adventures in Time	1993	designer	Sierra On-Line
Space Quest 6: Roger Wilco in the Spinal Frontier	1995	designer	Sierra On-Line
Shannara	1995	writer	Legend Entertainment
Callahan's Crosstime Saloon	1997	designer, artist, writer	Take-Two Interactive
Terminus	2000	voice actor	Vatical Entertainment
The Wild Thornberrys: Rambler (Game Boy Color)	2000	designer	Mattel Interactive
Blue's Clues: Blue's Alphabet Book	2001	designer	Mattel Interactive
King's Quest I: Quest for the Crown	2001	voice actor	Tierra Entertainment
King's Quest II: Romancing the Stones	2002	voice actor	Tierra Entertainment
Hungry Red Planet	2002	consultant	Health Media Lab
King's Quest III: To Heir Is Human	2006	voice actor	Infamous Adventures
Insecticide	2008	designer, writer	Gamecock Media Group
King's Quest III: To Heir Is Human	2011	voice actor	AGD Interactive
Leisure Suit Larry: Reloaded	2013	producer, designer, writer	Replay Games
Fester Mudd: Curse of the Gold	2013	consultant	Replay Games
Serena	2014	voice actor	Senscape
Hero-U: Rogue to Redemption	2018	writer	Transolar Games
Foolish Mortals	2025	additional dialogue	Inklingwood Studios
