= King's Quest III Redux =

2011 video game

King's Quest III: To Heir Is Human Redux
- Developer: AGD Interactive/Himalaya Studios
- Series: King's Quest (unofficial)
- Engine: Adventure Game Studio
- Platforms: Microsoft Windows, Macintosh
- Release: February 2011
- Genre: Adventure

King's Quest III: To Heir Is Human (aka King's Quest III Redux) is a fangame reimagining/retelling of Sierra Entertainment's King's Quest III: To Heir Is Human continuing from King's Quest II: Romancing the Stones. It was developed by AGD Interactive and released in February 2011 under fan license of Sierra Entertainment (a subsidiary of Activision Blizzard). It expands on the story of the original game, and continues the story of the villainous Father, introduced in the previous game. It introduces many new situations to the original King's Quest III. The game shares its title with the original version of the game. The term King's Quest III Redux appears in the files and the interface.

== Background ==
The young baby Gwydion is kidnapped from his castle by the evil Wizard Manannan (a member of the Black Cloak Society), to grow up as his slave. As is the tradition of the evil wizard, he will kill the boy upon his eighteenth birthday. That date is fast approaching, and it is up to Gwydion to escape the wizard, and find his way home.

Along the way Gwydion discovers his true heritage, of being the Prince Alexander, and that his homeland is nearing destruction. He defeats the wizard, and escapes Llewdor on board a ship. The pirates on board capture him, intending to make him a slave. Their first order of business takes them to Treasure Island, where they force Alexander to find an ancient treasure of the legendary pirate Seran. Alexander successfully finds the treasure, and the pirates sail on towards Daventry. Alexander escapes and makes his way across the mountains into Daventry, saves it from evil three-headed dragon and the machinations of The Father.

== Reception ==
The game has been well received in the gaming press, with largely positive reviews. CNN praised it as an example of a return to retro gaming.

== See also ==
- King's Quest III: To Heir Is Human (Sierra)
- King's Quest III: To Heir Is Human (Infamous Adventures)
- King's Quest II: Romancing the Stones
- Quest for Glory II: Trial By Fire (AGD Interactive)
- Al Emmo and the Lost Dutchman's Mine
