= Infamous Adventures =

Video game development company

- Industry: Video games
- Founded: 2004
- Key people: Shawn Mills; Steven Alexander
- Website: infamousadventures.itch.io

Infamous Adventures (commonly referred to as IA) is an amateur game development company, founded in 2004 by Shawn Mills and Steven Alexander, and is dedicated to making games in the classic adventure style made famous by the releases of Sierra Entertainment and LucasArts in the 1980s and early 1990s.

Their games are created using Chris Jones' Adventure Game Studio (AGS) engine, and the games have project teams composed of programmers, musicians, and artists from around the globe. All of their games are for free download via their website.

A post made on their website dated July 27, 2012, announced that they are no longer producing games. Shawn Mills and Steven Alexander also announced in the same post that they had started a new company, Infamous Quests, with the goal of creating original adventure games.

== Infamous Adventures games ==
=== Released ===
==== King's Quest III ====
Infamous Adventures released a remake of King's Quest III on June 19, 2006. In line with the AGD Interactive-created remakes of the original two Kings Quest games, the game features a point-and-click interface, as well as updated, VGA graphics. As well, a voice pack was released on August 21, 2006, consisting of voices for every character, as well as a narrator. The voice cast includes former Sierra employees Josh Mandel reprising his role from the official games as Graham, and Andy Hoyos (Mordack in King's Quest V) as Mannanan. The game also includes a new ending sequence for players who finish the game with a perfect score.

As of October 2008, the game had been downloaded more than 180,000 times.

==== Space Quest II ====
On 25 January 2007, Infamous Adventures posted a static image of a scene from Space Quest II. No confirmation of a SQ2 remake was announced however, allowing speculation to arise whether or not it was simply a homage to the Space Quest series or if they were secretly revealing that they were remaking Space Quest 2. On 1 April 2007, Infamous Adventures confirmed the VGA remake of Space Quest II. In April 2009 Infamous Adventures stated that Space Quest 2 was nearing alpha testing, and in April 2010 it was announced that the game was undergoing final stage beta testing. A teaser for the game (Space Quest For Glory) was released on April 15, 2011. The final product was released on 30 December 2011.

==== Quest for Infamy ====
Quest for Infamy was inspired by Sierra's Quest for Glory series and was to see the player return to Spielburg, but this time in the role of the villain. Three character classes were to be available, Brigand, Sorcerer and Assassin. In 2010 some details about the then cancelled Quest for Infamy were released on Infamous Adventure's website.

In June 2012, it was announced that Quest for Infamy was in development once again, but this time by the commercial company Infamous Quests. Infamous Quests' Quest for Infamy does not take place in Spielburg Valley and has no connections with the Quest for Glory series from Sierra On-Line, although the creators freely admit that there is certainly inspiration from that series, as well as all 90s adventure games and RPGs. A demo was made available at Infamous Quests website, and the company completed a successful Kickstarter campaign on July 6, 2012.

Quest for Infamy was released on July 7, 2014, for commercial distribution through publisher Phoenix Online Studios and GOG.com.

=== Cancelled projects ===
==== King's Quest: Kingdom of Sorrow (formerly Project X) ====
On 25 October 2006, IA announced that they were also working on another, secret game. Other than a trailer released on YouTube which was titled "Project X", there was little information concerning the story of this new game. It had been stated by the developers that Project X was not a recreation of any prior adventure game but an original title.

On June 18, 2010, Infamous Adventures announced that the mysterious "Project X" was a game entitled King's Quest: Kingdom of Sorrow - an adventure game based on the King's Quest novel of the same name by the writing team "Kenyon Morr". In the novel, Kingdom of Sorrow took place between King's Quest II and III, and featured King Graham traveling to a magical kingdom to save the Faerie Woods.

This game was announced to be cancelled on 27 July 2012.

== See also ==
- AGD Interactive, another development team that remakes classic Sierra games
- ScummVM, an interpreter for modern computers to play the original Sierra AGI versions of King's Quest III and Space Quest II, as well as old LucasArts games (its original purpose)
