= AGD Interactive =

Non-profit company

AGD Interactive (AGDI), LLC. is a non-profit company given a fan license to remake Sierra Entertainment's popular classic adventure games from the 1980s and early 1990s.

== History ==
The company was founded in 2001 by Britney K. Brimhall and Christopher T. Warren as Tierra Entertainment. It is best known for its remakes of the popular King's Quest games. AGD Interactive uses Adventure Game Studio to create their games.

On December 10, 2003, they ceased using the name Tierra Entertainment and began referring to themselves as AGD Interactive (AGD stands for Anonymous Game Developer). Subsequently, the two lead designers are credited as "Anonymous Game Designer #1" (Britney K. Brimhall) and "Anonymous Game Developer #2" (Christopher T. Warren). Information about the team can be found on their website.

They have also formed a commercial company, Himalaya Studios, which will focus on creating original, point-and-click adventure games with high-resolution graphics.

== Released games ==
=== King's Quest I Remake ===
AGDI's first release was a critically acclaimed point-and-click remake of King's Quest I: Quest for the Crown, released for download free of charge on August 8, 2001. This remake is known as King's Quest I VGA. In the month of its initial release, sales of Sierra's official King's Quest VIII: The Mask of Eternity skyrocketed. On January 17, 2009, AGDI released version 4.0 of the game, which, among other improvements, included enhanced backgrounds, the addition of narration vocals, and a new optional feature that can remove the walking dead situations which previously could have caused the game to become impossible to complete.

=== King's Quest II: Romancing the Stones ===
One year after the initial release of their King's Quest I remake, on December 3, 2002, AGDI followed up with the release of their second free remake, a complete overhaul of King's Quest II. This remake is known as King's Quest II+: Romancing the Stones. King's Quest II+ won the 2002 AGS Awards for Best Game, Best Story, Best Animation, Best Music, Best Scripting, and Best Documentation. Both games have been greeted by Sierra fans with enthusiasm, and consider these remakes almost equal to Sierra's later King's Quest VI. On March 14, 2009, AGDI released version 3.0, which features enhanced backgrounds, narrator vocals, character lip-syncing, detailed character portraits, and many other additions that increase the game's overall level of quality.

=== King's Quest III Redux ===
In February 2011, AGDI released a remake of King's Quest III: To Heir is Human. The game is titled King's Quest III Redux, and continues the non-canon plot and lore that was established in AGDI's previous King's Quest II: Romancing the Stones remake. The game is not a 1:1 remake and is not a complete overhaul like KQ2+ was, but features more fleshed-out characters, new areas, and puzzles not seen in the original Sierra version.

=== Quest for Glory II Remake ===
AGDI's remake of the popular Quest for Glory II: Trial by Fire was released on August 24, 2008. The remake includes extra content (such as a Saurus Repair Shop that was cut from the original release due to memory constraints), a more interactive battle system, additional dialogue interface options, and the option to have a simplified alleyway layout since the original was hard to navigate. Polygon considers the game to be one of the best fan remakes of a video game ever. PC World's Jim Norris also gave the game 4 out of 5 stars, considering it a "hand-polished classic", and the best of AGD Interactive's remakes.

== Canceled games ==
=== Royal Quest ===
The King's Quest remake was being developed simultaneously with a parody of the same game entitled Royal Quest: Retrieving Lost Shit. The game was canceled, as the team "believed that it did not promote the values and tone they were trying to preserve in remaking the old Sierra classics."

=== Space Quest II ===
Until early 2002, the AGDI development team was working on a VGA remake of Space Quest II: Vohaul's Revenge. Due to the lead programmer's disappearance, the development team did not have the resources required for both the Space Quest II remake and the King's Quest II remake, and the Space Quest II remake was put on indefinite hold. A small 3-room demo was released to show the progress up to the point when it was canceled. Infamous Adventures, another development team that remakes classic Sierra games, released a remake in December 2011.

== See also ==
- Himalaya Studios, the equivalent commercial company for original games
- Infamous Adventures, another development team that remakes classic Sierra games
