= Leisure Suit Larry in the Land of the Lounge Lizards =

1987 video game

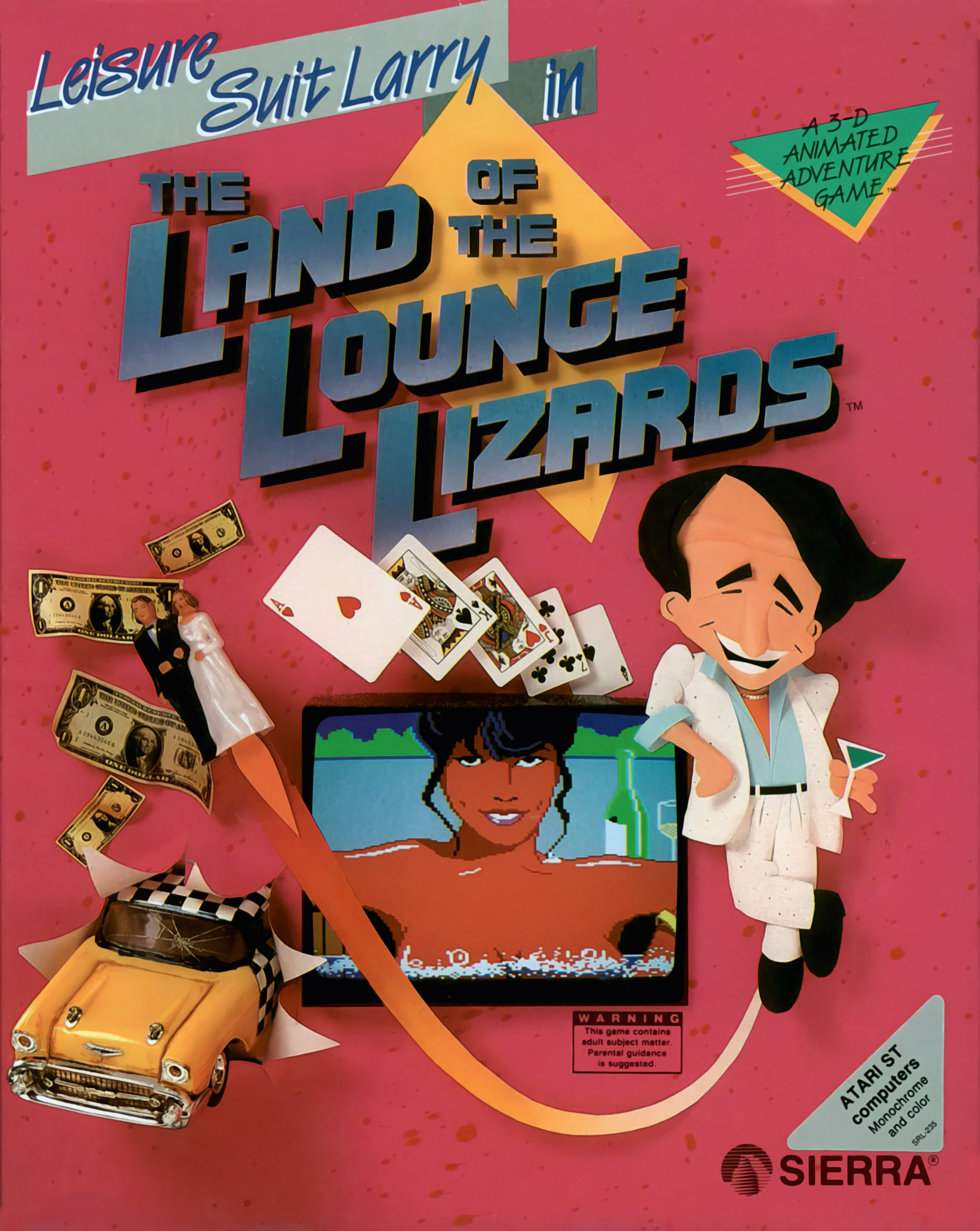
- 1987 cover art
- Developer: Sierra On-Line
- Publisher: Sierra On-Line
- Designers: Al Lowe; Mark Crowe; Chuck Benton
- Programmers: Al Lowe; Ken Williams
- Artist: Mark Crowe
- Writer: Al Lowe
- Composer: Al Lowe
- Series: Leisure Suit Larry
- Engine: AGI (original); SCI1 (remake)
- Platforms: MS-DOS, Amiga, Apple II, Apple IIGS, Mac, Atari ST, Tandy Color Computer 3
- Release: NA: June 1987; NA: July 1991 (remake)
- Genre: Adventure
- Mode: Single-player

Leisure Suit Larry in the Land of the Lounge Lizards is a graphic adventure game for adults only (age 18+) developed by Sierra On-Line, published in 1987. It was developed for MS-DOS and the Apple II and later ported to the Amiga, Atari ST, Apple IIGS, Mac, and Tandy Color Computer 3. It uses the Adventure Game Interpreter (AGI) engine. In 1991, Sierra released a remake titled Leisure Suit Larry 1: In the Land of the Lounge Lizards for MS-DOS, Mac, and Amiga. This version used the Sierra's Creative Interpreter (SCI) engine, featuring 256 colors and a point-and-click, icon-driven (as opposed to the original's text-based) user interface.

The game's story follows its player character of a middle-aged male virgin named Larry Laffer as he desperately tries to "get lucky" in the fictional American city of Lost Wages. Land of the Lounge Lizards establishes several elements which recur in the later Leisure Suit Larry games, including Larry's campy attire, perpetual bad luck with women, and penchant for double-entendres. The game's overall plot and basic structure follow that of Softporn Adventure, Sierra's own 1981 Apple II text adventure that did not feature Larry.

Despite a lack of advertising, the game was a sleeper hit and a commercial and critical success. It was followed by a long series of sequels and spin-offs over decades, beginning with Leisure Suit Larry Goes Looking for Love (in Several Wrong Places) in 1988. A second, high-definition remake, titled Leisure Suit Larry: Reloaded, was developed by N-Fusion Interactive working with the Larry series' creator Al Lowe and published by Replay Games in 2013. A version for Sega CD was also announced but was never released.

== Plot ==
The protagonist, Larry Laffer, is a middle-aged man who lives in his mother's basement and has not yet lost his virginity. Having grown weary of his lonely existence, he decides to visit the resort city of Lost Wages hoping to experience what he has not lived before and to finally find the woman of his dreams. Larry starts with nothing but an out-of-style 1970s disco-era leisure suit and $94 in his pocket. His quest involves four possible women: a nameless, seedy-looking sex worker; Fawn, a club-goer of low moral fiber; Faith, a receptionist who is faithful to her boyfriend; and Eve, a bathing beauty and Larry's ultimate goal.

== Gameplay ==
Players control Larry's movements with the directional keys and by inputting commands into a text parser (e.g. "talk to man", "open window", etc.). If Larry is too far away from a person or object to comply, or if the command is invalid, a caution message appears with hints on what to do.

The game's starting scene (EGA)

The game begins outside a bar in Lost Wages. The city consists of five areas: Lefty's Bar, a hotel-casino, a 24-hour wedding chapel, a disco, and a convenience store. The player can walk between areas that are next to each other, but other areas can only be accessed by hailing a taxi, which costs the player money; failure to do so results in Larry's being mugged or hit by oncoming traffic. To this end, money is essential to advance through the game. The only available method of augmenting Larry's funds is to gamble in the casino, playing blackjack and slots. During the early stages of the game, many premature deaths trigger an automatic restart, with a cutscene where a compartment opens beneath Larry's body and takes him to a laboratory where characters from Sierra's computer games—such as King's Quest—are re-assembled; in the remake, Larry's remains are instead thrown inside a blender and reformed.

Larry's interactions with key women are accompanied by a detailed image of whomever he is speaking with, unlike other non-player characters. With the exception of the sex worker, each of the women shuns Larry at first but responds favorably to gifts of varying sorts. Although it is not possible to woo all of the women, giving gifts is needed to advance to the game's final area, the hotel penthouse.

Players are given seven real-time hours (eight in the 1991 remake) to complete the game, at which point a despairing Larry commits suicide, resulting in game over. A sex worker is available as soon as the game starts. Should Larry have unprotected intercourse with her, he will contract a sexually transmitted disease and die shortly thereafter. This fate may be avoided by buying a condom at the convenience store. Larry questions the validity of losing his virginity to a sex worker, but the game resumes without a time limit.

== Development and release ==
Al Lowe, a former high school teacher, had carved a niche for himself at Sierra with his work on such Disney-licensed edutainment titles as Donald Duck's Playground, Winnie the Pooh in the Hundred Acre Wood, and The Black Cauldron, which he wrote, designed and programmed. In 1982, Sierra had released a text-only game on the Apple II titled Softporn Adventure (it was the only text adventure that was released by a company which had established its name on providing a graphical alternative to such games). In 1986, after Sierra lost a Disney license, Al Lowe suggested that Sierra should remake Softporn Adventure with the improved tools now at their disposal, and Ken Williams agreed.

Lowe, who considered the original Softporn Adventure "a primitive, early effort", borrowed its basic structure and added a graphic game engine (Sierra's Adventure Game Interpreter made famous by 1984's King's Quest: Quest for the Crown), improvised humor, and an on-screen protagonist, Larry Laffer. Chuck Benton, creator of Softporn Adventure, is included in the Leisure Suit Larry's end credits, as the game's layout and puzzles are identical to those found in the earlier title. However, Lowe said that in Softporn Adventure "there were no characters in the game. There was no central character at all. There were almost no characters to the women. And so it was a real role-over. I think there's one line of dialogue that I kept of the original game and all the rest was fresh." The game was co-designed and illustrated by Mark Crowe, creator of the Space Quest series, and co-programmed by Ken Williams. An accomplished jazz musician (The Lounge Lizards being a jazz band's name), Lowe also wrote the main theme music (called "For Your Thighs Only"), and some of his compositions appear in later entries of the series. The theme, inspired by Irving Berlin's 1929 song "Alexander's Ragtime Band", was composed within 20 minutes. Lowe said it "sounded so unusual, so different, so fresh compared to most computer game music, that I decided to write something with the same pep, simplicity, humor, and out-of-sync attitude."

Unsure of how the 1987 game would be received, Sierra's management chose to release it with no publicity or advertising budget. Due to its adult nature, the game includes an age verification system consisting of trivia questions that Al Lowe assumed children would not know the answers to. As many of the questions are U.S.-centric, they risked frustrating non-American players. If played today, the questions also include out-of-date cultural references. (One question begins "OJ Simpson is..." and one wrong answer is "under indictment".) In the original AGI version, the age verification screen may be skipped by pressing Alt-X (in the 1991 remake, it is done by pressing Ctrl-Alt-X).

== Reception ==
Reception

Aggregate score
Aggregator	Score
GameRankings	81%

Review scores
Publication	Score
Adventure Gamers	3.5/5 (1987 version)
Adventure Classic Gaming	5/5
The Games Machine	83%

Award
Publication	Award
Software Publishers Association	Best Fantasy, Role Playing or Adventure Game of 1987

Sierra received what Williams described as a "deluge" of mail opposing its release of Larry after he wrote a series of articles for Computer Gaming World discussing his company and the industry's views on adult software. Sales were very poor at first, with only 4,000 copies sold upon its release. Many stores refused to stock the game because of its adult content. Some resellers refused to handle the game, while others refused to advertise it, and one refused to list the game on its list of best sellers. In effect, its first-month sales were lower than any new Sierra product launch in years. A Sierra employee quit and a potential employee refused to work on Larry. Lowe stated, "My initial reaction was that I had wasted six months of my life". Word-of-mouth spread quickly, however, and by the year's end, the game became a commercial success, selling over 250,000 copies. It sold over 300,000 units in total. A significant number of players were female.

According to Sierra's marketing director John Williams, "Obviously lots of retailers were selling lots of Leisure Suit Larry, but no one wanted to admit it". It also became widely pirated, including in the Soviet Union. According to Lowe, a film adaptation was considered and he was flown to Hollywood to demonstrate the game in person. Footage from the game was used in the 1990 music video for Sailor's song "The Secretary". Leisure Suit Larry's success resulted in a line of sequels and spin-off titles. Combined sales of the Larry series surpassed 1.4 million units by March 1996.

Macworld reviewed the Macintosh version of Land of the Lounge Lizards in 1987, stating that "At its best, Leisure Suit Larry surprises you with clever animations that make you laugh ... And at its worst, the game is offensive ... Larry's idea of an ideal mate is shallow even for a parody ... There are many examples of a fifties mentality that are meant to be satirical but just seem lame". Macworld criticises Leisure Suit Larry's portrayal of women further, stating that it "contributes nothing to enlightened male attitudes towards women". Macworld compares Leisure Suit Larry to Leather Goddesses of Phobos, expressing that Leather Goddesses is "raunchy and humorous" without Leisure Suit Larry's "retrograde" portrayal of women.

Computer Gaming World's reviewer Roy Wagner ("a wholesome family man") stated that Larry "is a lot of fun to play and is very humorous ... with good graphics, good design, and good fun provided, who needs 'good taste'?" According to the review by Rob Steele of The Games Machine, the Atari ST version was entertaining and very enjoyable, even if "wholeheartedly sexist". In 2004, Adventure Gamers' Rob Michaud wrote: "Despite its weaknesses, it's a bona fide gaming classic, a must-play for adventure history buffs as well as those who just like risqué humor."

In 1988, Leisure Suit Larry in the Land of the Lounge Lizards was given an award for the Best Adventure, or Fantasy/Role-Playing Program of 1987 by the Software Publishers Association. In 1991, PC Format placed the first three Leisure Suit Larry titles on its list of the 50 best computer games of all time. The editors wrote, "The three Larry games so far plumb new depths in computer entertainment — they're crude, suggestive, full of innuendo and double entendres and designed to appeal to the worst aspects of human nature — you'll love 'em." In 1996, Computer Gaming World ranked it as the 69th best game of all time, also ranking it as the fifth most funny computer game, and stating: "Base, sexist, sometimes scatological humor, with no concessions made to taste or sensibilities, this was the best of a funny series." FHM included it on its 2011 list of six games "that shamelessly used sex to sell" but adding that it was actually "funny, well-crafted, and well-written" and "has become kind of like a cult classic among gaming fans." In 2012, Time named it one of the 100 greatest video games of all time, commenting: "A humor-filled adventure game that wasn't bashful about showing some skin? The world hadn't seen anything like it."

== 1991 VGA remake ==
Fawn in the 1991 remake (PC VGA)

A version of the game with VGA graphics and sound card audio appeared in 1991. Re-titled Leisure Suit Larry 1: In the Land of the Lounge Lizards and using the new game engine Sierra's Creative Interpreter, it was released in 1991 for the Amiga, MS-DOS, and Macintosh. For the first remake, Al Lowe served as director and designer, also helping to program the game, and Ken Williams became executive producer. Other key people included Stuart Moulder (producer), William R. Davis Sr. (creative director), William D. Skirvin (art designer), Mark Seibert (music director), Oliver Brelsford (lead programmer), and the music other than the theme song was composed by Chris Braymen. The suggested standard retail price of the 1991 version was $59.95, but Sierra offered owners of the original game an upgrade to the new game for $25.

=== Reception ===
Reception

Review scores
Publication	Score
Adventure Gamers	4/5
Amiga Action	90%
Amiga Format	53%

The 1991 VGA remake received mixed reviews from gaming publications. Jason Simmons of Amiga Action praised the technical improvements, stating that the "advanced graphics and new control system have improved the game by a huge degree," awarding it 90%. However, he noted performance issues, explaining that "without a hard drive it is slow and almost a chore to play" and warned that those who played the original "will probably find the new edition a waste of time and little more than an exercise in pretty pictures." Eva Hoogh of Amiga Format was more critical, giving the remake 53% and describing the graphics as "drab, fuzzy scenery" with "some objects barely discernible." She criticized Sierra's conversion work, stating that "sloppy, offhand conversions from the PC can actually do a game more harm than good." PC Action later gave the remake 4 out of 5 stars, calling it "probably the most entertaining game you are ever likely to play" while acknowledging that "this is actually an updated version of the original text adventure."

== Legacy ==
Developer N-Fusion Interactive and publisher Replay Games created Leisure Suit Larry: Reloaded as a modern point-and-click remake of the original game with updated HD graphics, voice, and other enhancements. The game was released for Windows, Mac OS X, iOS, and Android in 2013.
