= King's Quest (video game) =

King's Quest (video game) may refer to:

- King's Quest I, a 1984 video game
- King's Quest (2015 video game)
