= Adventure Game Interpreter =

Game engine developed by Sierra On-Line

- Original authors: Ken Williams; Jeff Stephenson
- Developer: Sierra On-Line
- Release: May 1984 (42 years ago)
- Final release: 3.002.149 / August 17, 1989 (37 years ago)
- Operating system: MS-DOS, Macintosh System, Atari TOS, AmigaOS, Apple ProDOS, OS-9
- Platform: Intel 8088, x86, Apple II, Apple IIGS, Mac, Amiga, Atari ST, TRS-80 Color Computer
- Available in: English
- Type: Game engine
- License: Proprietary software

The Adventure Game Interpreter (AGI) is a game engine developed by Sierra On-Line. The company originally developed the engine for King's Quest (1984), an adventure game that Sierra and IBM wished to market in order to attract consumers to IBM's lower-cost home computer, the IBM PCjr.

AGI was capable of running animated, color adventure games with music and sound effects. The player controls the game with a keyboard and, optionally, a joystick.

After the launch of King's Quest, Sierra continued to develop and improve the Adventure Game Interpreter. They employed it in 14 of their games between 1984 and 1989, before replacing it with a more sophisticated engine, the Sierra Creative Interpreter.

== History ==
=== IBM commissions a game ===
In late 1982, IBM began work on the PCjr, a lower-priced variant of the IBM Personal Computer with improved graphics and sound. The PCjr's Video Gate Array video adapter could display up to 16 colors at a time—a major improvement over the Color Graphics Adapter's four-color limit. The new sound chip, too, could output a wider range of tones than the PC speaker.

IBM commissioned Sierra to produce a game that could showcase these new capabilities. They discussed some requirements for the game, and IBM supplied Sierra with a PCjr prototype. They both agreed that the game should be animated—a first for Sierra. A team of six designers and developers, led by designer Roberta Williams, worked on the game that was eventually titled King's Quest. Among the developers were Chuck Tingley and Ken MacNeill (later releases also credit Chris Iden. An Apple II version credits Arthur Abraham).

=== King's Quest is a hit ===
IBM premiered the PCjr in 1984; it did not sell well and, therefore, neither did King's Quest. However, later that year Tandy Corporation released the Tandy 1000, an IBM PC compatible that succeeded where the PCjr failed. King's Quest caused a sensation in the burgeoning market of PC-compatible computers, and Sierra sold more than half a million copies. They ported it to other computers, including the Apple II, Apple IIGS, Macintosh, Amiga, and Atari ST, but IBM PC compatibles remained the primary platform for their games.

=== SCI replaces AGI ===
In 1988, with the release of King's Quest IV: The Perils of Rosella, Sierra debuted a more sophisticated game engine: the Sierra Creative Interpreter, or SCI. Since the SCI engine required a more powerful home computer, Sierra released an AGI version of the game at the same time. However, Sierra overestimated consumer demand for the lesser version, and ceased production.

The following year, Sierra published its final AGI-based title, Manhunter 2: San Francisco, then focused exclusively on SCI for new adventure game development. Among SCI's enhancements were a more versatile scripting system, an object-oriented programming model, higher-resolution graphics (320×200 rather than 160×200), a point-and-click interface, and support for additional sound card hardware.

== Technical design ==
The technical complexity of King's Quest made it a burden to write in assembly language, so the programmers created a game engine to simplify development. The engine comprised a bespoke programming language called the Game Adaptation Language, a compiler, and a bytecode interpreter (the Adventure Game Interpreter). The Game Adaptation Language was a high-level programming language that resembled C. This was compiled into bytecode, which was executed by the interpreter.

Like Sierra's early titles in the Hi-Res Adventures series, AGI games used vector graphics. The PCjr accepted floppy disks with a capacity of 360 kilobytes, and raster graphics would have consumed an excessive amount of disk space. Instead, King's Quest drew polygons on the screen, and then colored them. Beginning with AGI version 2, the game engine drew graphics in an off-screen data buffer, then blitted them into video memory. This approach was not just to economize use of system resources; it also prevented the game from revealing hidden objects while it drew the screen.

AGI was principally developed for 16-bit computer architectures, which were the state of the art in home computers at the time. These included the IBM PC compatible, the Atari ST, Commodore's Amiga series, and Apple's Macintosh computers. In addition, Sierra ported AGI to three 8-bit computer models: the TRS-80 Color Computer, the Apple IIe, and the Apple IIc.

== List of AGI games ==
From 1984 through 1989, Sierra published 14 games developed for the Adventure Game Interpreter:

AGI-based games published by Sierra On-Line
Game	MS-DOS	Apple II	Atari ST	Amiga	Apple IIGS	Mac	CoCo 3	C64
King's Quest	1984	1984	1986	1987	1987	1987	No	No
King's Quest II: Romancing the Throne	1985	1985	1985	1987	1987	1987	No	No
The Black Cauldron	1986	1986	1986	1987	1987	No	No	No
Donald Duck's Playground (Note: Although Sierra released Donald Duck's Playground for the Apple II, Tandy Color Computer (CoCo 3), and Commodore 64 (C64), they did not use the AGI engine in those versions of the game.)	1986	1985 (Not AGI)	1986	1986	No	No	1987 (Not AGI)	1984 (Not AGI)
King's Quest III: To Heir Is Human	1986	1988	1986	1986	1988	1988	1988	No
Space Quest: The Sarien Encounter (Note: Space Quest was originally implemented in version 2 of the Adventure Game Interpreter. Sierra re-released the game in 1987 after upgrading it to AGI version 3, which was capable of 16-color graphics and more sophisticated sound.)	1986	1986	1986	1987	1987	1987	No	No
Leisure Suit Larry in the Land of the Lounge Lizards	1987	1987	1987	1987	1987	1988	1988	No
Mixed-Up Mother Goose	1987	1990	1987	1988	1988	No	No	No
Police Quest: In Pursuit of the Death Angel	1987	1987	1987	1987	1987	1987	No	No
Space Quest II: Vohaul's Revenge	1987	1987	1987	1988	1988	1988	No	No
Gold Rush!	1988	1988	1989	1989	1989	1989	No	No
Manhunter: New York	1988	1988	1988	1988	1988	No	No	No
King's Quest IV: The Perils of Rosella	1988	1990	No	No	1989	No	No	No
Manhunter 2: San Francisco	1989	No	1990	1990	No	1989	No	No

== SCI remakes of AGI games ==
After the Sierra Creative Interpreter (SCI) became Sierra's engine of choice for adventure games, they continued releasing SCI-based sequels to their AGI-based adventure games through 1996. Although King's Quest IV: The Perils of Rosella (1988) and Manhunter 2: San Francisco (1989) were the only titles implemented in both game engines at launch (AGI for older computers, and SCI for more capable machines), they later published SCI remakes of five AGI-based games:

Game	Release date	
Game	AGI original	SCI remake
King's Quest: Quest for the Crown	1984	1990
Space Quest: The Sarien Encounter	1986	1991
Leisure Suit Larry 1: In the Land of the Lounge Lizards	1987	1991
Mixed-Up Mother Goose	1987	1990
Police Quest: In Pursuit of the Death Angel	1987	1992

In each remake, a point-and-click interface replaces the text parser, the graphics are redrawn in 8-bit color, the sound is redesigned for contemporary sound cards, and each piece of music is given a new arrangement.

The titles of King's Quest and Leisure Suit Larry in the Land of the Lounge Lizards were revised to fit the naming convention established for their sequels. The SCI implementation of Mixed-Up Mother Goose was republished in 1995 with higher-resolution graphics and additional music.

In all, of the 14 published games that Sierra developed using the Adventure Game Interpreter, seven were also developed for the Sierra Creative Interpreter. Sierra never remastered the remaining seven games:

- King's Quest II: Romancing the Throne (1985)
- The Black Cauldron (1986)
- Donald Duck's Playground (1986)
- King's Quest III: To Heir Is Human (1986)
- Space Quest II: Vohaul's Revenge (1987)
- Gold Rush! (1988)
- Manhunter: New York (1988)

== See also ==
- SCUMM
- ScummVM
