= Manhunter: New York =

1988 video game

- Developer: Evryware
- Publisher: Sierra On-Line
- Producer: Ken Williams
- Designers: Barry Murry; Dave Murry
- Programmers: Barry Murry; Dave Murry
- Artists: Barry Murry; Dee Dee Murry
- Composer: Barry Murry
- Engine: Adventure Game Interpreter
- Platforms: MS-DOS, Amiga, Atari ST, Apple II, Apple IIGS
- Release: September 1988
- Genre: Adventure game
- Mode: Single-player

Manhunter: New York is a post-apocalyptic adventure game designed by Barry Murry, Dave Murry and Dee Dee Murry of Evryware and published in 1988 by Sierra On-Line. A sequel, Manhunter 2: San Francisco, was released in 1989.

== Plot ==
The opening of the game shows the New York City skyline in 2002 and depicts it being attacked by a mysterious force. The main game is set in the futuristic year of 2004, when Earth has been enslaved by a race of aliens known as the Orbs. The Orbs, who look like giant floating eyeballs, have implanted all humans with global tracking devices, forced them to wear undistinguished robes, and forbidden them from speaking or communicating. The protagonist has been assigned by the Orbs to track down fellow humans who are believed to be forming an underground resistance. Over the course of the game, the player discovers that the Orbs are not the benevolent rulers they claim to be; they are actually harvesting humans as a food source. The player then "switches sides" and works to overthrow the Orbs. The player works against Phil, the antagonist, who is murdering members of the resistance. The game ends with the player flying an Orb ship and bombing various locations in Manhattan before Phil escapes.

The ending sets up the game for a sequel, Manhunter 2: San Francisco.

== Gameplay ==
Manhunter: New York used Sierra's Adventure Game Interpreter (AGI) development tool. It was different from other AGI games in that it did not use a text parser, incorporated a first-person rather than third-person perspective, and featured a rudimentary point-and-click interface. The gritty, sometimes gory visuals, unique interface, and use of real-life locations in New York City all helped set the game apart from Sierra's other titles, which were typically more family oriented.

The Apple II version of Manhunter allows the option of skipping the sewer maze because memory limitations prevented saving the player's progress in that section.

== Reception ==
The game sold more than 100,000 copies.

== See also ==
- Manhunter 2: San Francisco – the game's sequel
