= Manhunter 2: San Francisco =

1989 video game

- Developer: Evryware
- Publisher: Sierra On-Line
- Producer: Ken Williams
- Designers: Barry Murry; Dave Murry
- Programmers: Barry Murry; Dave Murry
- Artists: Barry Murry; Dee Dee Murry
- Composer: Barry Murry
- Engine: Adventure Game Interpreter
- Platforms: MS-DOS, Amiga, Atari ST, Mac OS
- Release: Mid 1989
- Genre: Adventure game
- Mode: Single-player

Manhunter 2: San Francisco is a post-apocalyptic adventure game designed by Barry Murry, Dave Murry, and Dee Dee Murry of Evryware and published in 1989 by Sierra On-Line. It is the sequel to Manhunter: New York, developed by the same authors.

The rights to Manhunter are held by Activision following their acquisition of Sierra's intellectual property in 2008, but there are no plans for resumption.

== Plot ==
The game continues the story depicted in Manhunter: New York. The game begins with the player, piloting an Orb ship in pursuit of the antagonist Phil Cook, crash-landing in San Francisco. Another Manhunter on the ground is killed in the crash, so the player assumes his identity. As the gameplay progresses, the player learns of an organized resistance, experiments that have created mutant slaves, and the goal of the malevolent Orbs. The player is able to turn the mutant slaves back into humans, who go on to kill numerous Orbs in San Francisco. The game reaches its climax when the player is on the verge of catching Phil Cook. Phil narrowly escapes in an Orb ship with the player hanging on to the outside, flying off towards London.

== Reception ==
Reception

Review scores
Publication	Score
Computer and Video Games	61%
Adventure Classic Gaming	3/5

Computer and Video Games (UK) gave the game a score of 61%, criticizing the game's unorthodox mixture of adventure and arcade elements (compared to most other Sierra games of the era). Scorpia at Computer Gaming World gave the game a positive review, calling it an "excellent" followup to the previous game.

The game sold more than 100,000 copies.
