= Gold Rush! =

1988 video game

- Developer: Sierra On-Line
- Publishers: Sierra On-Line; The Software Farm; Sunlight Games
- Designers: Ken MacNeill; Doug MacNeill
- Programmer: Ken MacNeill
- Artists: Robert Eric Heitman; Doug MacNeill
- Composer: Anita Scott
- Engine: AGI
- Platforms: Amiga, Apple IIGS, Atari ST, MS-DOS, Apple II, Mac
- Release: 1988
- Genre: Adventure
- Mode: Single-player

Gold Rush! (later retitled California: Gold Rush!) is a graphic adventure video game designed by Doug and Ken MacNeill and released by Sierra On-Line in 1988.

Gold Rush! was among the last games Sierra produced with the AGI interface and one of the most complex. The Software Farm, run by the original developers, owns and publishes the game rights.

== Gameplay ==
Screenshot (MS-DOS)

The game opens in Brooklyn Heights, New York, in 1848, before the California Gold Rush. The player controls Jerrod Wilson, a newspaperman who receives a mysterious letter from his estranged brother Jake in California. Jerrod decides to head west, but has only 14 minutes of gameplay to quit his job, liquidate his assets, and gather supplies before news of the Gold Rush drives prices beyond reach.

Three routes lead to California, each with distinct dangers. The stagecoach is an option that remains available regardless of how long Jerrod stays in Brooklyn. This overland route provides a valid option but still requires careful timing and preparation to survive Native Americans, unruly oxen, parching deserts, steep mountain passages, and potential winter storms in the Sierra Nevada.

The Panama route costs more and travels by ship to Panama, then on foot through the jungle, where hostile natives confiscate all possessions except sentimental items. The jungle harbors venomous snakes, carnivorous plants, quicksand at river crossings, and alligators. Travelers must prepare for tropical hazards from malaria to killer ants.

The Cape Horn route requires a lengthy voyage around South America's southern tip. A violent storm forces the crew to jettison cargo, and travelers must fish to avoid starvation. Scurvy poses an additional threat.

Cholera and other diseases can strike at any time with no warning or cure. Players should save frequently in multiple slots.

All routes converge at Sacramento. At Sutter's Fort, clues from a cemetery gravestone and a hotel in nearby Coloma lead Jerrod to Jake's mine, where the brothers reunite and discover the Mother Lode.

== Copy protection ==
Gold Rush! uses words from the book California Gold: Story of the Rush to Riches by Lou and Phyllis Zauner, which came with the game as a form of copy protection. If the player fails to enter the correct word at a certain point during the game, their character is immediately arrested for claim jumping and hanged on the gallows, which is the same as the regular in-game punishment for claim jumping, being caught in someone's hotel room, or stealing.

== Reception ==
In 1989, Dragon gave the game 4½ out of 5 stars. Computer Gaming World gave the game a positive review, noting it mixes historical simulation with Sierra's traditional adventure gameplay. Compute! called Gold Rush "entertaining, somewhat educational, and a terrific escapade for first-time adventure game players", but warned that its simplicity might disappoint veteran gamers and that the graphics were inferior to that of some other Sierra adventures.

In 2011, Adventure Gamers named Gold Rush! the 96th-best adventure game ever released.

== Legacy ==
=== Collector's edition ===
The Software Farm released a collector's edition of California: Gold Rush! in a wooden box in 2000. They also released an economy pack that included just the game, packaged in an envelope.

=== Remake ===
German game developer Sunlight Games secured the rights and re-released the original version in July 2014. A remake with the name Gold Rush! Anniversary was released in November of the same year for Microsoft Windows, OS X and Linux. The ports for iOS and Android were released in March 2015. All graphics are pre-rendered, but all animations and characters are displayed in real-time 3D. The game's graphics are in high definition and the music was remade. All text from the original game was optimized with newly recorded voiceovers. The game can be controlled by a point-and-click control or with a parser (only Windows, Linux and Mac), which is similar to the old Sierra games which use the AGI interface. Gold Rush! 2 was released in April 2017 as a sequel to Gold Rush! Anniversary.

Sunlight Games has also released a Special Edition which is limited to 350 copies. The Special Edition comes in a box with a banderole, and the content of the box is similar to the old Sierra boxes is: a copy of the game on a DRM-free DVD, a poster, a card with the serial number, a printed making-of booklet, a printed booklet with concept drawings, and a golden-colored coin. Gold Rush! The Special Edition can only be ordered at Sunlight Games' online shop.

Adventure Gamers gave the remake 1½ stars out of 5. Just Adventure gave the game a rating of B−. 3rd-strike gave the game a 7.0.
