= Donald Duck's Playground =

1984 video game

- Cover of the Commodore 64 game box
- Developer: Sierra On-Line
- Publishers: Sierra On-Line; U.S. Gold
- Designer: Al Lowe
- Engine: Adventure Game Interpreter (Amiga, ST, IBM PC, PCjr)
- Platforms: Amiga; Atari ST; Apple II; Commodore 64; IBM PCjr; IBM PC; TRS-80 Color Computer
- Release: 1984: C64; 1986: Amiga, Apple II, Atari ST, IBM PC, PCjr; 1987: TRS-80 CoCo
- Genre: Educational
- Mode: Single-player

Donald Duck's Playground is an educational video game published by Sierra On-Line in 1984. The player takes the role of Donald Duck, whose job is to earn money so that he can buy playground items for his nephews. To do this, Donald can get himself a job in any of four different workplaces. Each job shift lasts from one to eight minutes, as the player chooses, during which time Donald must earn as much as possible.

Donald Duck's Playground was originally written for the Commodore 64 and subsequently ported to Sierra's AGI interpreter for the Apple II, PC compatibles, Amiga, and Atari ST. A version for the TRS-80 Color Computer followed as well.

== Gameplay ==
Donald Duck explores the town

=== The jobs ===
Donald has a different task at each job. He earns a set amount for each part of his job; on the Intermediate level, these wages are doubled, and on the Advanced level, they are tripled.

- The greengrocer's: Donald is responsible for sorting vegetables thrown to him from the back of a pick-up truck in three different boxes. One of the boxes is for watermelons, one is for pumpkins, and one is for cantaloupes. Each vegetable gets thrown at a randomly chosen distance. Donald has to catch it and put it in the correct box. Failing to catch the vegetable or putting it in the wrong box results in it being squashed and no money earned. Donald earns 1 cent for each vegetable correctly sorted.
- The toy shop: Donald is responsible for putting toys given to him from a conveyor belt in the correct place on a shelf. Every 80 seconds or so, a train will pass on a nearby railroad. If the shelf is open at the time, the train will cause toys to fall from the shelf, resulting in lost revenue. Donald has to close the shelf for the time the train is coming. Donald earns 5 cents for each toy placed on the shelf.
- The railroad: Donald is at a switch console, responsible for putting switches on the tracks in the correct order, so that cargo trains can pick up their cargo from the correct cars and deliver it to the correct city. Donald earns 15 cents for each delivery routed.
- The airport: Donald is responsible for sorting cargo given to him on a conveyor belt into the cargo vans for flights. Each item of cargo bears the three-letter abbreviation of some U.S. airport. Donald has to throw it into a passing cargo van with the matching code. Near the end, the aeroplane leaves, and Donald has to stop sorting cargo. Donald earns 3 cents for each item sorted.

=== The playground ===
Donald can spend his hard-earned wages by buying various items such as ladders and swings for a playground that his nephews can play at. They can be bought from three different stores where the player must be able to count the amount of coins and bills needed for an item, and, if the total is not even, the change.

Each item purchased is placed in a specific location on the playground. By going across the railroad, Donald can call up one of his nephews (in practice, the player character switches from Donald to his nephew), and he can then play on the playground.

== Reception ==
The Rainbow magazine said the game is so much fun that one might not notice the educational content. They noted the game having some of the best graphics and animation on the TRS-80 Color Computer.

== See also ==
- List of Disney video games by genre
