= King's Quest (2015 video game) =

- Developer: The Odd Gentlemen
- Publisher: Activision (Note: Released under the Sierra Entertainment brand name)
- Director: Matt Korba
- Producer: Lindsey Rostal
- Designer: Matt Korba
- Artists: Evan Cagle; Nathan Fulton
- Writers: Matt Korba; Lindsey Rostal
- Composers: Ben Stanton; David Stanton
- Series: King's Quest
- Engine: Unreal Engine 3
- Platforms: Microsoft Windows; PlayStation 3 PlayStation 4 Xbox 360; Xbox One
- Release: Chapter I: Microsoft Windows, PlayStation 3 & PlayStation 4; WW: July 28, 2015 Xbox 360 & Xbox One; WW: July 29, 2015; Chapter II: PlayStation 3 & PlayStation 4; WW: December 15, 2015 Microsoft Windows, Xbox 360 & Xbox One; WW: December 16, 2015; Chapter III: WW: April 26, 2016; Chapter IV: WW: September 27, 2016; Chapter V: WW: October 25, 2016; Epilogue: WW: December 20, 2016
- Genre: Adventure
- Mode: Single-player

King's Quest is an episodic video game series developed by The Odd Gentlemen and published by Activision under the Sierra Entertainment brand name for Microsoft Windows, PlayStation 3, PlayStation 4, Xbox 360 and Xbox One. It is a re-imagining of the long-running King's Quest adventure game series. The interface is not fully point-and-click, and the Windows version only uses point-and-click for the dialogue and first person scenes.

The game is one of several attempts at resurrecting or rebooting the King's Quest franchise since 1998, and its first chapter was released about 32 years after King's Quest I. The new chapters are seen as neither a remake nor necessarily a sequel but a "re-imagining". The original games are considered to be part of the canon of the new series, as each chapter will take place between those games; however, previous games may be reinterpreted in completely new ways.

== Gameplay ==
Unlike some of the classic King's Quest video games, the new King's Quest is not a point-and-click adventure. Instead, it is an adventure game that tasks players to control Graham, who ventures to different places to become a knight. The movement of Graham can be completely controlled by players. According to Matt Korba, the game's creative director, the game's controls focuses on "one-button context". As a result, the game does not have any complicated interfaces or controls. Player interaction includes picking up, gathering, and inspecting scenery items. They can switch to first-person perspective when inspecting them.

The game is narrated by the elderly King Graham and his granddaughter Gwendolyn. Players' actions in the game change the narrative. For instance, performing certain actions unlocks additional dialogue. When players make wrong decisions and die, Graham replies with phrases such as "That's what would have happened if I did that", before players re-spawn. Players also make decisions throughout the game that are divided into three different approaches, bravery, wisdom, and compassion. Actions performed by players have consequences and impact the game's story, and as a result, change the game's overall experience. Most of these choices are game play-based. According to Korba, all the choices made by Graham are heroic, and there is no way for players to build a "bad" Graham.

The first section is linear, where levels open sequentially. Players are free to explore levels, and have no prescribed or predetermined paths. Players can use a variety of methods to complete their objectives, and are tasked to solve various puzzles, with no fixed solutions. Players can also have conversations with anyone in the game. The game features branching dialogue, action sequences, quick-time events, and on-rail platform elements.

== Story ==
=== Setting and Characters ===
The story of King's Quest is both based on but also considerably alters certain events from the original King's Quest series. The story is still nevertheless set in the kingdom of Daventry during the reign of a now-aged King Graham (voiced and narrated by Christopher Lloyd) as he recounts his adventures to his granddaughter, Gwendolin, from his earlier days before he was even knighted in Daventry, his early days as king following King Edward's passing, his actual encounter with his future spouse, Queen Valenice, his reunion with his lost son, Alexander, and picking up to his actual days on his one last adventure.

While events are still altered, original locations, such as Kolyma (King's Quest II) and Llewdor (King's Quest III), still exist, as do original characters, such as Hagatha (the antagonist from King's Quest II), as well as Mannanan (the antagonist from King's Quest III). However, King's Quest also adds new characters, such as Amaya, the town's local blacksmith, Whisper, who is a dashing, yet helplessly narcissistic, knight, and Olfie, one of the kingdom's local bridge trolls who's also participating in a strike.

=== Plot ===
This covers the overall plot of King's Quest. Several details, choices and events that are chosen by the player are omitted for simplification.

Graham tardily arrives at Daventry to participate at the Knight Hopeful's tournament, hoping to make a name for himself, squaring off against the strongest Acorn, the fastest Whisper, the tiny, but clever, Manny and the foreign pragmatic Achaka. In spite of not being considered by either Acorn or Whisper, Achaka and Manny see potential in Graham, due to his way of thinking. However, in the trial to acquire the eye of a ferocious beast (the dragon who'd later guard the Magic Mirror), Graham accidentally causes Achaka's death, shaking him deeply. Convinced by Manny to persist in the tournament to honor Achaka's sacrifice, Graham bests both Acorn and Whisper in their respective duels (Strength and Speed) and squares off against Manny in a Duel of Wits game, luckily outsmarting him. Frustrated at his defeat, Manny fruitlessly tries fighting Graham and then flees.

Following his coronation and unable to initially handle the overwhelming bureaucracy of the realm, Graham tries going out for a walk in town, only to be kidnapped by goblins, along with the town dwellers. Forced to handle chores while, at the same time, looking after the villagers' health, Graham manages to break from his prison and infiltrate the Goblin King's court, where he discovers the goblins' obsession with fairy tales and how Manny used it to orchestrate Graham's kidnapping. Graham would also eventually discover Manny himself is also a goblin, who sought to be crowned to elevate the goblins to a higher standing in Daventry. Graham overpowers the Goblin King and rescues the townsfolk.

Years later, though he is successful is restoring Daventry, Graham feels lonely and, following the directions of the Magic Mirror, departs to Kolyma to rescue and marry his destined betrothed, Queen Valenice. However, he discovers there are two trapped princesses instead, named Vee and Neese, held hostage by the witch, Hagatha, later revealed to have been a former princess, as well, who was trapped by her parents, due to her magical powers. With the help of either princess he comes closer with, Graham helps redeem Hagatha and rescue both princesses, with the beloved one revealing herself to be Valenice, but the other, ignored one, is accidentally cursed by Hagatha's time-freezing spell meant to forever trap them.

Graham and Valenice marry and sire their children, Alexander and Rosella, the former of whom is kidnapped by Mannanan (revealed to be a transformed Manny) and trained, along with Manny's switched-at-birth brother, Mordon, to usurp Daventry's throne. After nearly two decades of Graham's fruitless search, however, Alexander manages to escape from Mannanan's grasp and reunites with his family. Graham attempts reconnecting with Alexander by planning a family vacation, but, upon arrival, they discover that the realm was frozen solid by Queen Icebella - revealed to be the princess accidentally cursed and brainwashed by Mannanan, whom had returned taking the form of a sphinx. Besting Mannanan's complex puzzles across his labyrinth, in spite of the initial rift between both, Alexander and Graham break free, along with Valenice and Rosella, and Valenice briefly manages to get Icebella to remember her former identity before Mannanan kills her, predicting she'd betray him. Alexander, with the leftovers of the cat-transforming cookie he once used, turns Mannanan into a cat once again and the Royal Family returns back to Daventry.

Fast-forwarding to later days, Graham, now too old to attempt adventures, tries to find a new adventure himself, but he finds the realm set ablaze and discovers Mannanan called upon Graham for a final challenge. While Graham does his best to keep his failing mental condition and meets Manannan on the final duel and honestly passes through the trials, Mannanan reveals a rigged game to strike the realm with a destructive poison. Graham, however, takes the poison himself to save Daventry and, as Manannan tries torturing him to death, a repentant Mordon, who changed his name to Mordack and recalling how Graham saved him from abuse at one point, intervenes and destroys the crystal maintaining Manannan's form, ultimately destroying the wizard and saving the king.

Bedridden from the poison, Graham tells the tales of his adventures to Gwendolin across the game while making an alteration to a critical rule of Daventry in order to allow her to inherit the throne. Before he passes away the night following his final story, he leaves a letter to Gwendolin inspiring her to follow her own adventures. In the epilogue, on her own adventure, she comes across Achaka's granddaughter, Taskia, and both find a dragon Taskia is supposed to slay to avenge Achaka's death. However, upon discovering the dragon is an infant, they befriend the dragon and return to the castle.

== Development ==
There were multiple attempts to reboot the franchise following 1998's King's Quest: Mask of Eternity, none of which passed the announcement or concept stages. In August 2014, Activision revived the Sierra brand and had passed development responsibilities for a new game to The Odd Gentlemen. The lengthy game was split into multiple chapters with a staggered release schedule. The script for the first chapter alone is 640 pages long, including branching paths, Easter eggs, narration, object use and interaction, and dialogue trees. Each chapter of the series was longer and more complex than some similar episodic series, such as those made by Telltale Games. Voice actors include Christopher Lloyd, Wallace Shawn, Tom Kenny, Josh Keaton, Maggie Elizabeth Jones, and Zelda Williams.

== Release ==
The game was released in five parts in 2015 and 2016, with an optional playable Epilogue only included in King's Quest: The Complete Collection edition.

Chapter	Directed by	Written by	Episode release date
Chapter I: "A Knight to Remember"	Matt Korba	Matt Korba, Additional Writing Lindsey Rostal	July 28, 2015
Graham's journey to knighthood begins in this chapter. It takes place before the original King's Quest as memories of the present-day Graham (who is now aged), narrated to his granddaughter, Gwendolin.
Chapter II: "Rubble Without a Cause"	Matt Korba	Matt Korba, Additional Writing Lindsey Rostal	December 15, 2015
Graham recounts his first adventure as the newly-crowned king of Daventry saving the kingdom from invading goblins.
Chapter III: "Once Upon a Climb"	Matt Korba	Matt Korba, Additional Writing Lindsey Rostal	April 26, 2016
Graham recounts the tale of how he met his beloved Valenice. Climbing a tower, Graham finds two princesses - Vee and Neese - trapped by the witch, Hagatha.
Chapter IV: "Snow Place Like Home"	Matt Korba	Matt Korba, Additional Writing Lindsey Rostal	September 27, 2016
After Graham's son, Alexander, escapes his life of enslavement to Manannan, they celebrate by taking the family on vacation. However, they find the resort has been transformed into a snowy palace of lethal traps by an icy queen and a sphinx.
Chapter V: "The Good Knight"	Matt Korba	Matt Korba, Additional Writing Lindsey Rostal	October 25, 2016
As the elderly King Graham reaches the end of his life, he has enough time to tell Gwendolyn about his final confrontation with Manannan.
Epilogue	Matt Korba	Lindsey Rostal	December 20, 2016

== Reception ==
Aggregate review scores
Game	Metacritic
Chapter I: A Knight to Remember	PC: 82/100; PS4: 77/100; XONE: 80/100
Chapter II: Rubble Without a Cause	PC: 67/100; PS4: 68/100; XONE: 71/100
Chapter III: Once Upon a Climb	PC: 78/100; PS4: 79/100; XONE: 80/100
Chapter IV: Snow Place Like Home	PS4: 67/100
Chapter V: The Good Knight	PS4: 78/100

=== Chapter I: A Knight to Remember ===
Chapter I: A Knight to Remember received positive reviews. Aggregating review website Metacritic gave the Microsoft Windows version 82/100 based on 23 reviews, the PlayStation 4 version 77/100 based on 22 reviews and the Xbox One version 80/100 based on 26 reviews.

=== Chapter II: Rubble Without a Cause ===
Chapter II: Rubble Without a Cause received mixed reviews. Metacritic gave the Microsoft Windows version 67/100 based on 7 reviews, the PlayStation 4 version 68/100 based on 12 reviews and the Xbox One version 71/100 based on 11 reviews.

=== Chapter III: Once Upon A Climb ===
Chapter III: Once Upon A Climb received positive reviews. Metacritic gave the Microsoft Windows version 78/100 based on 4 reviews, the PlayStation 4 version 79/100 based on 10 reviews and the Xbox One version 80/100 based on 8 reviews.

=== Chapter IV: Snow Place Like Home ===
Chapter IV: Snow Place Like Home received mixed reviews. Chris Carter from Destructoid gave this chapter a 9/10 while Chandler Wood from PlayStation Lifestyle had some mixed feelings about the chapter, giving it 5.5 being happy with "some great cultural references and lines/seeing Graham continue to grow" but generally disliking the "cold and dull environment/boring and dated puzzle design/lack of meaningful choices/underplays capabilities showcased in prior chapters".

=== Chapter V: The Good Knight ===
Chapter V: The Good Knight received generally positive reviews. Chris Carter from Destructoid gave this chapter 8.5/10. Chandler Wood from PlayStation Lifestyle was pleased with this chapter this time around, giving the game 8/10, praising the "deep subjects of mortality, life accomplishments, and what we leave behind/Callbacks to King's Quest through the years/Conclusion that pulls the whole saga into context and finishes it out nicely" although being unhappy with the "sudden onset memory loss" and some "flawed" puzzle design.

=== The Complete Collection ===
During the 20th Annual D.I.C.E. Awards, the Academy of Interactive Arts & Sciences nominated King's Quest: The Complete Collection for "Adventure Game of the Year".
