= King's Quest =

- Genre: Adventure
- Developers: Sierra On-Line; The Odd Gentlemen
- Publisher: Sierra Entertainment
- Creator: Roberta Williams
- First release: Wizard and the Princess; 1980
- Latest release: King's Quest: Epilogue; December 20, 2016

King's Quest is a graphic adventure game series, released between 1980 and 2016 and created by the American software company Sierra Entertainment. It is widely considered a classic series from the golden era of adventure games. Following the success of its first installments, the series was primarily responsible for building the reputation of Sierra. Roberta Williams, co-founder and former co-owner of Sierra, designed all of the King's Quest games until the series' reboot in 2015.

The King's Quest series chronicles the saga of the royal family of the Kingdom of Daventry through their various trials and adventures. The story takes place over two generations and across many lands as the heroes and heroines fight villains such as evil witches and wizards.

== Games ==
Release timeline
1980	Wizard and the Princess
1981
1982
1983
1984	King's Quest I: Quest for the Crown
1985	King's Quest II: Romancing the Throne
1986	King's Quest III: To Heir Is Human
1987
1988	King's Quest IV: The Perils of Rosella
1989
1990	King's Quest V: Absence Makes the Heart Go Yonder!
1991
1992	King's Quest VI: Heir Today, Gone Tomorrow
1993
1994	King's Quest VII: The Princeless Bride
1995
1996
1997
1998	King's Quest VIII: Mask of Eternity

- Wizard and the Princess (1980) / Adventure in Serenia (1982)
- King's Quest (PC, 1984) / King's Quest: Quest for the Crown (1984/1987) / King's Quest: Quest for the Crown (Sega Master System, 1989) / King's Quest I: Quest for the Crown (1990)
- King's Quest II: Romancing the Throne (1985/1987)
- King's Quest III: To Heir Is Human (1986)
- King's Quest IV: The Perils of Rosella (1988 – enhanced Sierra's Creative Interpreter)
- King's Quest V: Absence Makes the Heart Go Yonder! (1990) / King's Quest V (NES, 1992)
- King's Quest VI: Heir Today, Gone Tomorrow (1992)
- King's Quest VII: The Princeless Bride (1994)
- King's Quest: Mask of Eternity (also known as King's Quest VIII: Mask of Eternity) (1998)
- King's Quest, an episodical "re-imagining" by The Odd Gentlemen (2015–2016)

== Original series ==
The world of King's Quest encompasses many different kingdoms and supernatural realms. The main characters in the series are King Graham, originally a knight of Daventry who won the throne of the kingdom through questing, and members of his family: his wife Queen Valanice and his twin son and daughter, Prince Alexander and Princess Rosella. The exception is King's Quest: Mask of Eternity, where the protagonist is Connor of Daventry, a tanner (and a knight like Graham from the first game) who is unrelated to the royal family. The later sequels have more elaborate storylines, more complicated puzzles, and more original and well-developed characters.

Technologically, the series pioneered the use of animation and pseudo-3D environments in graphic adventure games, so that the main character could, for example, walk behind objects on-screen. The primary way in which characters solve puzzles and advance through the game is by using items found earlier in the game and stored in their inventory. Other puzzles include the mapping of labyrinths, deserts, or other inhospitable places; solving riddles; and tasks involving the use of logic or lateral thinking skills. It is important to use all one's character's senses to gather all the information available: look, listen, smell, taste, or touch whenever possible.

=== The Quest ===
The "King's Quest" (for which the series takes its name) usually involves becoming a king or the adventures of members of the royal family of Daventry in other lands to save their kingdom. Often, the quest is given to the protagonist through the realm's magic mirror (the first game involves obtaining the magic mirror, which becomes an important feature in the later games).

In King's Quest I: Quest for the Crown, the young knight Sir Graham is sent by the dying King Edward on a quest to destroy the wicked witch Dahlia and find three treasures in order to become the new king. In King's Quest II: Romancing the Throne, the quest is for King Graham to find his queen. Through the magic mirror, retrieved in the first game, he learns of the beautiful Valanice captured by the witch Hagatha in the land of Kolyma.

The follow-ups King's Quest III: To Heir Is Human and King's Quest IV: The Perils of Rosella do not star Graham, but involve the protagonists who ultimately end up saving the king and/or the kingdom from threats such as a dragon and untimely death. Gwydion begins as a peasant of Llewdor and a slave of the wizard Manannan; he escapes by using the wizard's magic against him, and ultimately discovers he is really Alexander, the long-lost son of King Graham and Queen Valanice and brother of the Princess Rosella. After Alexander restores the magic mirror and saves Rosella and the kingdom from the ravages of the dragon, Graham is taken deathly ill; to obtain a cure for her father, Rosella must travel to the fairy land of Tamir (after learning about it through the magic mirror) and vanquish the witch Queen Lolotte.

King's Quest V: Absence Makes the Heart Go Yonder! returns to the King in his attempt to rescue both his kingdom and family from Mordack, Hagatha's and Manannan's brother and also an evil magician, who is seeking revenge against Alexander for Manannan's downfall, in the land of Serenia. This is the first game that does not include the magic mirror.

King's Quest VI: Heir Today, Gone Tomorrow follows Prince Alexander's attempt to save his true love, marry her, and ultimately becoming the king of the Land of the Green Isles. The magic mirror pointed him in the right direction to finding the kingdom.

King's Quest VII: The Princeless Bride is the only game in the series that does not involve King Graham (he is missing entirely from the story), Castle Daventry, or saving the kingdom of Daventry (only a small portion of the land is shown briefly in the introduction), nor the magic mirror. Rather, the plot involves the dual protagonists Queen Valanice and Princess Rosella attempting to save the realm of Eldritch from the evil enchantress Malicia. Rosella ultimately finds a romantic interest in Prince Edgar, whom she rescues with the implication that they may marry in the future.

King's Quest: Mask of Eternity is similar to King's Quest I, in that it involves a young knight attempting to save King Graham (who stands in place of Edward), Queen Valanice, and the kingdom of Daventry from harm. Again the magic mirror shares a prominent role in telling of the doom that befell the kingdom.

=== Development ===
Much of King's Quest was inspired by fairy tales, which designer Roberta Williams loved reading, in particular the Andrew Lang's Fairy Books. Many creatures, characters and situations from world mythologies, fairy tales, folklore and classic literature are encountered within the world of King's Quest. Many of the puzzle solutions are inspired by various tales so that a player with knowledge of the stories beforehand would have an advantage.

The concept of the King's Quest series was derived from ideas first established in Wizard and the Princess (Adventure in Serenia) which was an early forerunner of the series. The game versions followed the exploits of an unnamed hero known only as the "wanderer", in later versions said to be a time traveler from the future. The game's connection to the King's Quest series led to its inclusion as one of the King's Quest trivia questions. The fifth King's Quest game marked a return to Serenia, the land first seen during the game. The game's backstory was further tied into the King's Quest history through The King's Quest Companion. According to the Companion, in various periods of history people from the real world withdrew to Daventry, which explains how historical and mythical elements exist there. In most of the series, it is said that the games take place, 'a long time ago' a few centuries in our past.

Many of the classic Sierra games series had in-jokes, cameos, or homages to characters, situations and elements of the King's Quest series. Cedric from KQV was often the brunt of several jokes found in Freddy Pharkas: Frontier Pharmacist, Quest for Glory: Shadows of Darkness, and Space Quest VI. Rosella has appeared in or was mentioned in the Leisure Suit Larry series, Police Quest II, and Quest for Glory series. Graham is mentioned in or appears in several of the Space Quest, Police Quest, and Laura Bow games.

=== Other media releases ===
==== Collections ====
The games in the series have been released together in several collections or bundles through the years (often packed with bonus material).

- King's Quest 15th Anniversary Collector's Edition (1994): It contains KQI (AGI & SCI versions) through KQVI, King's Questions, and King Graham's Board Game Challenge. It also contains a French floppy version of KQV, and the German floppy version of KQVI, as well as a variety of concept material, artwork, documents, articles, and videos.
- King's Quest Collection (1995): It contains KQI (AGI & SCI versions) through KQVI, as well as all of the bonus material from the 15th Anniversary Collector's Edition, plus some additional ones including a playable demo of KQVII.
- Roberta Williams Anthology (1996): It contains KQI (AGI & SCI versions) through KQVII (2.0 version), plus Wizard and the Princess, Laura Bow Mysteries 1 & 2, Mixed-Up Mother Goose (AGI & VGA versions), Mystery House, Mission Asteroid, Time Zone, Dark Crystal, and Chapter 1 demo of Phantasmagoria, as well as a variety of bonuses.
- King's Quest Collection Series (1997): Also known as King's Quest Collection 2; it contains KQI (AGI & SCI versions) through KQVII (2.0 version), King's Questions, Graham's Board Game Challenge, Wizard and the Princess, Mixed-Up Mother Goose Deluxe, Laura Bow 1 & 2, Mystery House, Mission Asteroid, and Time Zone. It also contains most of the bonuses from the previous versions as well as some new ones.
- King's Quest MASK/Collection Bundle (1998): A special bundle sold through Sierra during the release of King's Quest Mask of Eternity. It included both the 1997 King's Quest Collection, and King's Quest VIII at a discounted price plus the first seven games. Both products came in separate boxes.
- King's Quest Collection (2006): Vivendi Universal released King's Quest Collection, a compilation CD for Windows XP encompassing games KQI–VII. Rather than porting the games directly, however, this release uses the original versions running under the DOSBox emulator and a Windows front end (as a result, it is also possible to run KQI–VI on other platforms with a little tweaking and ports of DOSBox). King's Quest VII is the earlier 16-bit Windows version, version 1.4, lacking DOS compatibility, but runs natively on Windows 32-bit versions but is incompatible with 64-bit windows. Missing in the collection are the original AGI version of King's Quest I, as well as installation for the Windows CD version of King's Quest VI with high-resolution character art (although the assets can be accessed through ScummVM), the 2.0 DOS and Windows versions of KQVII, and King's Quest: Mask of Eternity. It also lacks any of the bonus material from previous collections. This collection was released on Steam in 2009, but has been later removed, likely due to bugs and compatibility issues.
- King's Quest Bundle: King's Quest 1+2+3, 4+5+6, and 7+8 collections (2010): Three collections released by Activision through GOG.com. The first consists of the classic AGI versions of King's Quest I–III (the KQI remake is not included) released 2010, and the later games King's Quest 4–5–6 on Vista. The final collection contains King's Quest 7 (2.0 version) and 8 designed to work on Vista and Windows 7 32-bit and 64-bit. The collections come with assorted bonus material such as windows background artwork. All three sets can be bought as a bundle; the "King's Quest Bundle" at 30% off the regular price of all three separately.
- King's Quest: The Complete Collection (2015): Bundles the five chapters and a bonus playable episode of the reboot King's Quest series.

==== Collection bonus material ====
- Inside the Chest: A program containing reprints of magazine articles, game reviews, designer interviews, studies of game development process, and other documents related to the KQ series.
- Behind the Developer's Shield: A program containing pencil sketches, background and game art, and other documents related to the game development of KQI–VII.
- A View from Inside the Mirror: A series of videos including an interview with Roberta Williams and Ken Williams, talking about the history of the King's Quest games, and other Sierra products she was involved with. Roberta Williams reflects upon her role as the designer of this award-winning series.
- Hold onto Your Adventure's Cap: A series of videos concerning the development of KQVII plus a video preview of the game.
- The Royal Scribe: A document containing information about the Sierra company, their various series, and each King's Quest game, with a few interviews from the developers (including Roberta Williams, Josh Mandel, Jane Jensen, and Lorelei Shannon).
- King's Questions: A trivia game with randomized questions.
- King Graham's Board Game Challenge: Checkers & Backgammon: A board game collection starring King Graham.

==== Quest for Daventry ====
Quest for Daventry is a King's Quest V themed pinball board in Take a Break! Pinball, one of the first pinball games for Windows. Other boards in the game are also based on Sierra game characters like Larry Laffer, Gir Draxon, Willy Beamish, and Roger Wilco. The pinball game follows a narrative story with objectives based on the KQV adventure game. The board transforms adding new locations as the player finishes missions. Short cut scenes are shown near the ticker when certain objectives are met, and the ticker lists narrative or objective information.

==== Hoyle's Official Book of Games series ====
This game contains both King Graham and Rosella as opponents. They both are able to communicate with other players in the game, discussing various topics related to the Kingdom of Daventry. One notable aspect of the stories of the characters is that it introduces Rosella's Great-Grandfather, who "slew the Dragon of Herenna". Another discussion between the royal family and Roger Wilco establishes that Roger once crashed a spaceship into Castle Daventy's moat (a nod to an Easter egg in Space Quest: The Sarien Encounter). Graham and Rosella along with two King's Quest villains Mordack and Lolotte would go on to appear in Hoyle 3: Board Games, although they are not nearly as interactive, only commenting on moves in the game. In Hoyle's Classic Card Games only Graham returns as an opponent representing the series' characters, again comments were limited in interactivity, but it contains fully digitized speech.

=== Books ===
==== Guide books ====
Most of the games of the series came with manuals that included short stories or recap of the series. The manual for KQIII included the spellbook needed to solve the puzzles in the game (the spells were reprinted in The King's Quest Companion). Often the manuals contained information used for copy-protection schemes. The manual for KQVIII contained assorted information concerning the lands, enemies, and potion and health items in the game.

- Guidebook to the Land of the Green Isles – Written by Jane Jensen, it was a booklet packed in with KQVI, which discussed background and geography of the Land of the Green Isles. The book also contained copy protection information for the game.
- King's Quest V Hintbook – Written by Roberta Williams. Gives a behind the scenes details of the making of KQV and the King's Quest series, and the stories of the previous games. It contains concept art from KQV. The book is split into sections for each major area in the game; each section begins with a character introduction giving a few details about most of the characters.
- King's Quest VI Hintbook – Written by Lorelei Shannon. It discusses the making of the game as well as the Royal Family and the events leading up to KQVI, giving more background to the game, and contains concept art.
- King's Quest VII: The Official Hint Guide – Written by Lorelei Shannon. It also contains an interview with Roberta Williams, a making of KQVII section, a summary of King's Quest (discussing the events of each game leading up to KQVII), and a section giving the backstories and legends explaining the backstories of the game's characters; it also contains concept art from the game.
- The Official Book of King's Quest – Written by Donald B. Trivette. Series contains crossword puzzles, clues, trivia, synposes/backstory information, making of the games information/photos, pronunciation guides, secret debug codes, and other technical information/history of the games.
- The Official Book of King's Quest: Daventry and Beyond: Foreword by Roberta Williams, making of KQIV.
- The Official Book of King's Quest (Second Edition)
- The Official Book of King's Quest VI/The Official Book of King's Quest (Third Edition), published with two different cover titles. Has an interview with Roberta Williams discussing the development of KQVI, material concerning making of KQV, and line artwork.
- King's Quest: Mask of Eternity Prima's Official Strategy Guide- Written by Rick Barba. Basic strategy guide offering little in the way of extras.
- The King's Quest Companion – Written by Peter Spear and published in four editions. The book contains novelizations of games, as well as articles that further explained the history of Daventry, its geography, the characters, and magic. The first two editions also contains An Encyclopedia of Daventry (Abridged) which gave even more details about various subjects relating to Daventry.
- Authorized King's Quest VII Players Guide – Written by Peter and Jeremy Spear. It is a strategy guide and novelization of KQVII.

==== Novels ====
Three original novels have been published by Boulevard Books:

- The Floating Castle (1995): Written by Craig Mills, placed somewhere between KQIV and VI, it follows Alexander on a quest to discover what is behind the mysterious Floating Castle and the monstrous invasions over the kingdom.
- The Kingdom of Sorrow (1996): Written by Kenyon Morr (pseudonym of Mark Sumner and Marella Sands), placed between KQII and III, it follows the adventures of Graham, who moves to rescue an imprisoned Fairy Queen held by the giant Dunstan in order to return balance in nature.
- See No Weevil (1996): Also written by Kenyon Morr, set between KQII and III. Taking place seven years after the previous book, it focuses on Rosella, just before her 15th birthday, who must run the Kingdom of Daventry during an absence of her parents.

== Cancelled games ==
=== King's Quest II & III remakes ===
In 1990 the developers at Sierra redeveloped King's Quest with a new interface and up-to-date technology. The plan was to redevelop King's Quest II and King's Quest III but due to rather disappointing sales of the 1990 remake of King's Quest I, the prospect of officially remaking and re-releasing the sequels was scrapped.

=== Davidson version of King's Quest VIII ===
Between September 1996 to January 21, 1997, due to criticism over the content in King's Quest: Mask of Eternity and Phantasmagoria by Davidson & Associates, a team of managers was assigned to work above Roberta Williams. They began creating their own version of KQVIII while ignoring her version. Their version was purged of combat, violence and possibly religious themes. While Williams continued to work on her own ideas including its own script and puzzles, the Davidson's team of managers began to design their script and puzzles for their own version of KQVIII. Davidson's intervention was ultimately stopped (Davidson left the company in January 1997) and Williams reasserted her control, but this was not without its damage to her version of the game's final release (due to loss of time and funding), which was already hurting from other technical issues caused by Dynamix engine development problem and others.

=== Cancelled sequels ===
There have been several attempts to create a ninth installment in the King's Quest series, all of which have been canceled before going into production. All three development attempts never went past announcement or concept stages nor received official titles. They were described as the next game in the "King's Quest" franchise in known released information. King's Quest 9 or Kings's Quest IX are more unofficial designation for being the next game in the franchise used by the media in regards to released information. The idea of a King's Quest 9 goes back to some of the discussions with Roberta Williams after the release of King's Quest: Mask of Eternity.

The King's Quest: Mask of Eternity Prima's Official Strategy Guide by Rick Barba made reference to King's Quest IX as the next title in the series if a new one was made (or at least as a description of the ninth game in the series). Roberta Williams offered a few ideas for a King's Quest IX in 1998–1999, her version never saw development. The ninth game has been in development four times since then with three different developers, Vivendi Games, Silicon Knights, and Telltale Games between 2001 and 2013, and eventually The Odd Gentlemen rebooted the series in 2015.

==== Roberta Williams/Sierra ====
Following the release of King's Quest VIII (Mask of Eternity), Roberta Williams occasionally alluded to ideas if she was allowed to make the follow-up game or ideas that would influence the direction of any follow-up games, or ideas that were cut during the process of KQVIII that she would have liked to have introduced in the following game. Though she was generally tightlipped on the subject when it came to the next game, there are a few details. These never evolved into anything, however, and the game was neither started nor canceled.

Primarily it was decided during the production of KQVIII that Graham was now too old to go on adventures, and that Alexander would be less likely to go on adventures as he now had his own concerns as king of the Green Isles. This led to Roberta introducing a new playable character into the series (which started with Connor), which probably would have had similar impact in future games in the series had she had the chance to develop them. Rosella was still a possibility for use in future games, and Williams tossed out the idea that Connor might even meet the princess. This idea grew to include the idea that Rosella would possibly fall in love with Connor, or Connor would fall in love with Rosella and initiate some kind of love triangle between them and Rosella's other love interest, Edgar (KQIV/KQVII). In addition she had ideas to add multiplayer as early as KQVIII early development, but these were cut and she hoped to introduce them into future games in the series. Some of the ideas were an MMO (massive multiplayer online) adventure game, with the ability for players to collect and swap items to help each other solve puzzles, or fight monsters together.

==== Vivendi Games ====
There was a ninth installment in development by Vivendi Games (under the Sierra branding) between 2001 and 2002. It was canceled before going into production. The game never made it past the prototype stage. Images of two renders of the playable character were leaked to the public. The renders show what looks like an older and bearded King Graham, wielding a giant sword, wearing full armor, and having the ability to flip in the air, suggesting that it may have been a third-person action-adventure game, similar to the 3D Legend of Zelda games. This, like later attempts at producing a new game, were described as the new King's Quest, and not necessarily KQIX (though news media referred to it as King's Quest 9).

==== Silicon Knights ====
Silicon Knights worked on a prototype for a King's Quest game at some point before Telltale Games acquired the rights. This information was released to the public through documents on the Silicon Knights suit against Epic Games.

==== Telltale Games ====
Telltale Games' take on the ninth installment of the King's Quest franchise was first announced at a press event on February 17, 2011. Telltale said that they had entered into an agreement with Activision, then current owner of the rights to the classic Sierra On-Line adventure franchises, to create new episodic games based on those series. The first Sierra intellectual property they intended to work on was King's Quest. As development never went far, the game never received a title beyond the reference to the franchise name.

The game was to follow the format of previous Telltale Games series such as Tales of Monkey Island, as a continuation of the series with all new episodic games and multiple series. It was intended to preserve the back story of King's Quest, and fit into the established canon. It was intended to include the challenge and possibilities of death of the original games, but the gameplay was going to be adapted to relieve some of the frustration present in the original games.

Telltale approached Roberta Williams, the originator of the series, and one of the designers on all of the original games, to see if she was interested in working on the new one. While she declined by saying she had retired from games, she did offer the development team advice, which was "very valuable", according to developer Dave Grossman. In May 2012, Dan Connors confirmed that Dave Grossman was in charge of the King's Quest project, and Telltale was working on how to proceed. The game was confirmed to be canceled by Telltale senior vice president of publishing, Steve Allison, on April 3, 2013.

== Fan-created games ==
There have been several fan-created King's Quest games both original and retellings of the original games that have been released by various developers. Mike and Matt Chapman, creators of the Homestar Runner series of cartoons and games, have created a game known as Peasant's Quest, mostly based on King's Quest I but with allusions throughout the game to King's Quest II, King's Quest III, King's Quest IV, and The Black Cauldron.

== Reception and legacy ==
King's Quest is considered especially influential in its genre, affecting the tone and presentation of early graphic adventure games such as Maniac Mansion and other LucasArts adventure games.

The pseudo-3D gameplay of the first King's Quest game was held as revolutionary and became standard for graphic adventure games; it is the first in the genre enabling players to, in third-person perspective, move their character behind and in front of on-screen objects. It is also the first computer game supporting 16-color EGA graphics. Despite the commercial failure of the PCjr, the platform of origin for which King's Quest was developed as a technical showcase by IBM's request, the game was ported to many other systems and swiftly reached bestseller status.

The King's Quest series became known for its characteristic narratives and pushing technology and graphics with further entries. King's Quest III doubled the scope of its two predecessors and in 2006 earned a place in Time's list of 50 Best Video Games of All Time. King's Quest IV is among the first games to support sound cards, first adventure games to support a mouse and first games to feature a female protagonist. It achieved even higher commercial success despite doubts by Williams's peers about the acceptance among male audiences of playing as female. The series's innovations continued with King's Quest V which introduced an icon-based interface; it received critical acclaim and several awards, as well as a spot in Computer Gaming World's 1996 list of greatest games of all time. King's Quest VI has been praised as one of the best adventure games or even video games in general.

In 1996, Next Generation listed the series as number 79 on their "Top 100 Games of All Time", commenting that, "humor, story telling, and classic puzzle implementation make the King's Quest series the most consistent top-quality line-up in computer gaming's history".

By 1994, the King's Quest series had sold 2.5 million copies, making it the bestselling computer game series at that time. According to Sierra, combined sales of the series surpassed 3.8 million units by the end of March 1996. By 1997, the series had sold 7 million copies.

King's Quest: Mask of Eternity, a gameplay departure with action elements and in real-time 3D form, underperformed commercially and critically. That year, 1998, after decline under new management by CUC International, Sierra was sold to Vivendi.

Roberta Williams had by 1993 become seen as the most popular game designer at Sierra, celebrated for her King's Quest series. The franchise has been noted as one of the few major video game series created and maintained near in total by a female designer.
