= King's Quest I =

1984 video game

King's Quest
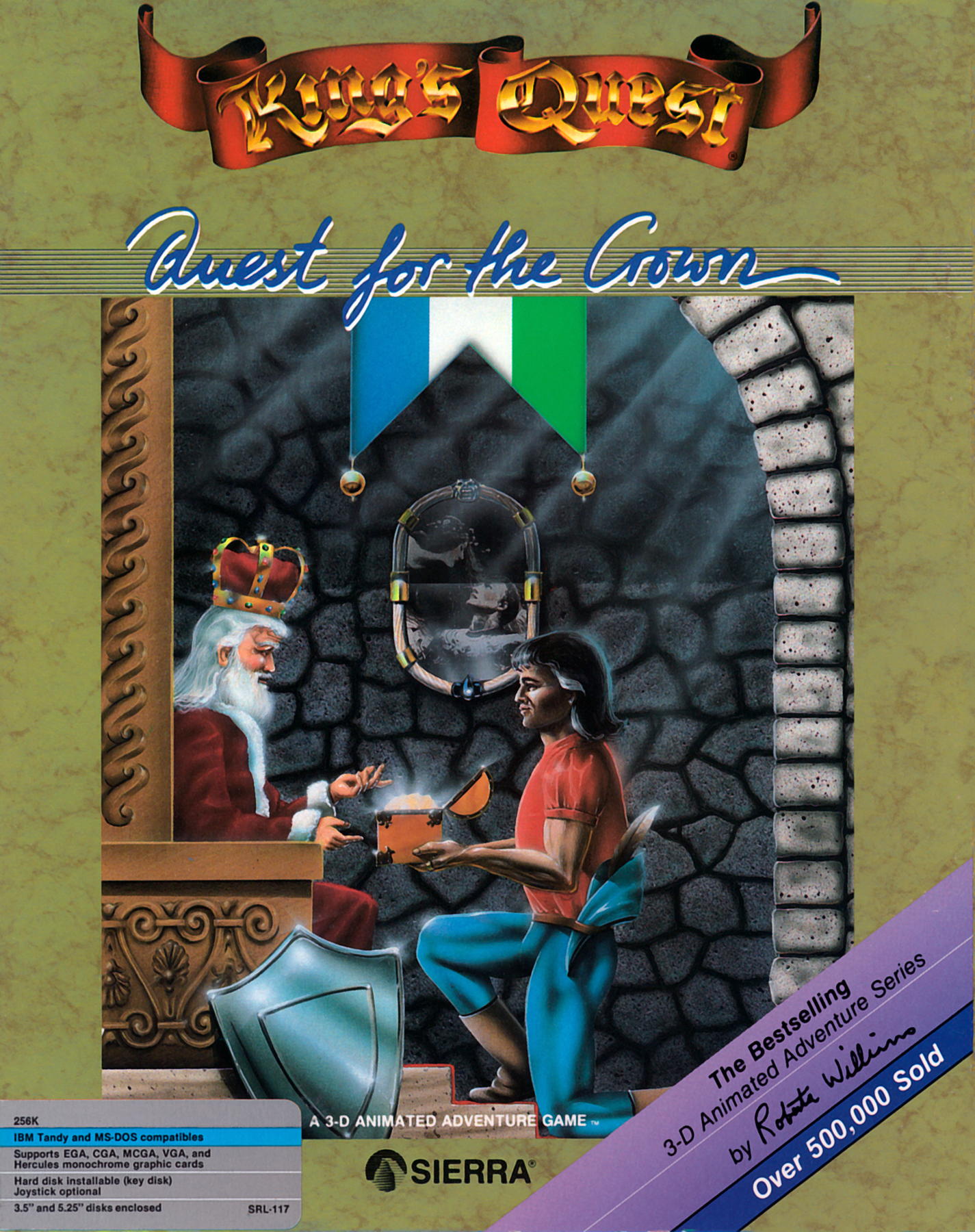
- Developer: Sierra On-Line
- Publishers: IBM, Sierra On-Line
- Designer: Roberta Williams
- Writer: Roberta Williams
- Composer: Ken Allen (1990 remake)
- Series: King's Quest
- Engine: Adventure Game Interpreter (original); Sierra Creative Interpreter (remake)
- Platforms: IBM PCjr: Tandy 1000; Apple II; Apple IIGS; Atari ST; Amiga; Macintosh; MS-DOS; Master System
- Release: May 1984; 1990 (remake)
- Genre: Adventure
- Mode: Single-player

King's Quest: Quest for the Crown, originally released as King's Quest, is an adventure game developed by Sierra On-Line and published originally for the IBM PCjr in 1984 as the first entry in the King's Quest series. It was released for several other home computer systems between 1984 and 1989, as well as the Master System console. The game follows the young knight Sir Graham as he journeys through the pseudo-medieval fairy tale-inspired fantasy realm of Daventry, on a quest to recover three magical items and become the next king. It is presented as an interconnected set of locations, or flip-screens, with a pseudo-3D art style. The player interacts with locations and items using text commands, and must avoid numerous hazards and obstacles in their quest.

King's Quest was developed by Sierra after it was approached by IBM to make a game similar to Sierra's Wizard and the Princess (1980) that would showcase the computing power of the upcoming PCjr with animation and complex graphics. It was designed by Sierra co-founder Roberta Williams as a blend of common fairy tales, and was completed over the course of 18 months by Williams and a team of 6 programmers and artists, who had to develop new techniques for making graphical adventure games with visual depth. A reusable game engine was developed for the game, the Adventure Game Interpreter, which was reused for later Sierra games.

The game was a bestseller, with over 100,000 copies sold by 1986. Critics applauded the advances in graphical gameplay, as adventure games previously were text-based or had static images, though some found the game slow-paced and very difficult. An official remake was released in 1990 with updated graphics, and an unofficial remake was released in 2001 for modern systems. King's Quest has been credited with saving Sierra from the financial effects of the video game crash of 1983, and has been considered the start of the graphic adventure genre. The series it started, which includes a further seven games by Sierra, has been termed its flagship series. King's Quest has been named as one of the most important computer games of all time, and in 2020 was inducted into the World Video Game Hall of Fame.

== Gameplay ==
The opening location of the game; a text input parser is located below the main screen

King's Quest is an adventure game set in the pseudo-medieval fairy tale-inspired fantasy realm of Daventry, in which the player controls the character Sir Graham to complete a quest for three magical items. The game world is divided into dozens of locations, or flip-screens, with one location visible at a time. These locations are presented in pseudo-3D as if viewed from the side, with the player moving Graham around the screen in front of and behind other elements of the location.

In addition to moving Graham, the player can interact with the objects, obstacles, and creatures within the location. This is done by entering text commands, which can be one or two words (e.g., "get stone") or more complex phrases (e.g., "use key on lock"). The allowable commands are contextual to where Graham is standing in the location the player is in; for example, "get stone" only has an effect if Graham is standing in a part of a screen where there is a stone present. Some locations have, sometimes randomly, other characters which, if they come near Graham, can take items, move Graham to a new location, or kill him. Graham can also die from numerous hazards in the game, such as drowning or falling; upon death, the player can reload the game from the last time they saved their game. The game only supports a single saved game, and it is possible for crucial items to be stolen, resulting in a game that can no longer be won.

The goal of the game is to find three magical treasures and return to the castle at the beginning of the game, at which point the game ends. There are additionally many items which can be obtained and put in the player's inventory; most are used to solve puzzles or unlock new locations, while some can be used to prevent Graham dying from monsters or enemies. Some items have no gameplay impact but solely award points, which are tracked throughout the game but have no effect otherwise. Some puzzles have multiple solutions depending on the items the player has found, and the order the player solves puzzles and finds locations is restricted only by the items they have.

== Plot ==
The original release version of the game has a minimal story, mostly told through the game's manual. The Kingdom of Daventry is suffering from recent disasters and hardship. King Edward calls his bravest knight, Sir Grahame, to his throne and tells him he has heard of three legendary treasures hidden throughout the land that would end Daventry's troubles if found: a mirror that shows the future, a shield that protects the bearer from all harm, and a never-ending chest of gold. If Grahame succeeds, he will become the new king.

In later releases, Grahame was renamed to Graham, and the backstory in the manual was expanded; that expansion was brought into the game in the 1990 King's Quest I: Quest for the Crown remake. King Edward the Benevolent was tricked three times in his reign by magical beings who stole the precious magical items of the kingdom, causing the kingdom to fall into ruin. At the end of his life, the dying King Edward sends for his bravest knight, Sir Graham, to retrieve the three lost treasures. As the king has no heir, if Graham succeeds, he will become the next king.

In all versions of the game, Sir Graham embarks upon a quest for the items through Daventry, climbing to the Land of the Clouds to recover the chest of gold, facing underground leprechauns to retrieve the shield, and outwitting a dragon to get back the mirror. After retrieving all the items, Graham returns to the throne room in time to present them to the king. Just before the king dies, he passes on the rule of Daventry to Sir Graham as promised.

== Development ==
The opening location of the game in the Quest for the Crown version of the game

Sierra On-Line was founded in 1979 by Roberta and Ken Williams as On-Line Systems, and over the next few years released several successful adventure video games while growing to nearly a hundred employees with US$10 million in revenue. In late 1982, it was approached by IBM to develop a graphical adventure game that would showcase the graphical capabilities of the upcoming IBM PCjr home computer, similar to Sierra's Wizard and the Princess (1980), but with animation and more complex graphics that would not be possible on systems like the Apple II. Sierra agreed; Roberta had already wanted to build on her experience with The Wizard and the Princess with a fully animated adventure game, in a pseudo-3D world. The PCjr supported 16-color Color Graphics Adapter (CGA) graphics, and had more computer memory than most previous home computers, which had limited adventure games to static images. Sierra spent 18 months on the game, with Roberta as designer alongside a team of 6 programmers and artists. With funding from IBM of US$700,000 (equivalent to about $2,300,000 in 2025), it was the most expensive title Sierra had developed to date. IBM demanded secrecy about the project; Sierra referred to it as "BFC" in documents and never saw a PCjr prior to launch, instead using modified IBM PCs.

Roberta Williams interpreted IBM's request for a game like Wizard and the Princess literally, and decided to write a game with a heroic player-character saving a kingdom. She made the game world as a blend of common fairy tales that could be directly experienced as a game. Sierra later stated that the core elements of a King's Quest game were family-friendly humor, fairy tale themes, cute characters, a clear story, and non-violent solutions to problems. King's Quest was the first Sierra game to feature a third-person character as the protagonist, as the Apple II, which its previous games were built for, was not powerful enough.

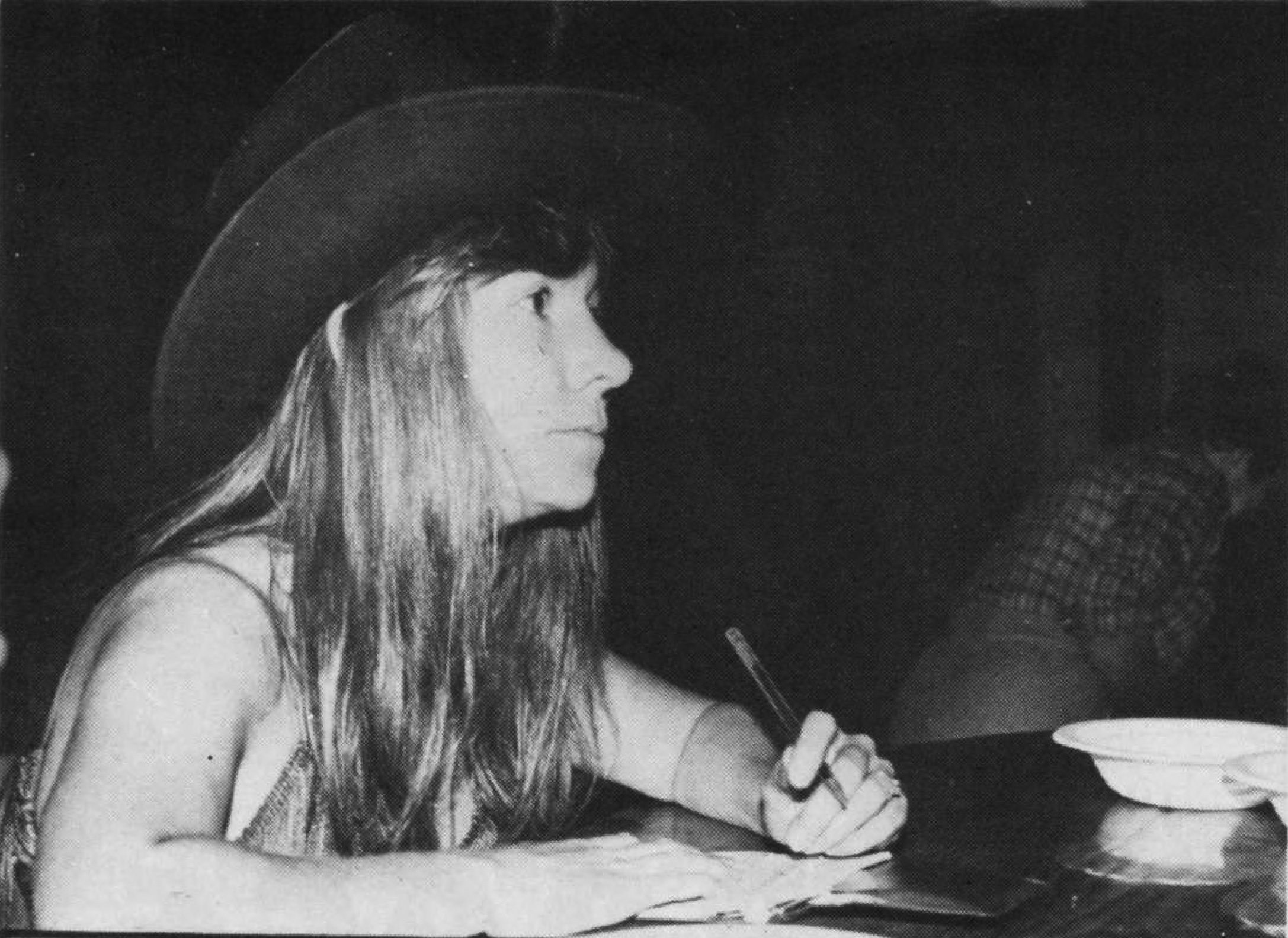
Roberta Williams in 1981

The development process began with Roberta drafting the story and puzzles of the game on paper, before the other developers then implemented that design. The artists began by drawing the backgrounds for each of the 80 locations in the game; these backgrounds were saved as a set of drawing instructions, rather than images, to save space, resulting in each screen being drawn over the course of a few seconds whenever Graham enters a location. The instructions were made with a custom program used to scan in the artists' paper drawings, with the artist selecting lines or areas and setting their color and "priority", or how far in the foreground or background they are. Sierra developed an engine for the game to interpret and react to player inputs called the Adventure Game Interpreter (AGI)—initially the "Game Adaptation Language"—which could be reused for later titles.

King's Quest was first shown to the public at the Winter Consumer Electronics Show in January 1984. IBM published King's Quest for the PCjr that May, soon after the release of the PCjr. With IBM's encouragement, as it was under pressure from the US government for monopolistic business practices, Sierra published versions for other home computers before and especially after the PCjr was discontinued in May 1985, such as the Tandy 1000 and Apple IIe. Sierra continued to release King's Quest for other home computer systems over the next few years, such as MS-DOS for IBM PCs, the Atari ST, Amiga, Macintosh, and the Apple IIGS, adding support for newer graphics standards like EGA. A port for the Sega Master System video game console was released in 1989.

In 1990, Sierra re-released the game as King's Quest I: Quest for the Crown, using the successor engine to AGI, the Sierra Creative Interpreter (SCI). Enhancements were made to the story and puzzles to bring it more in line with later games in the series, and support was added for higher resolution graphics and sound cards.

== Reception ==
By 1986, Sierra reported that the game had sold over 100,000 copies, and by mid-1987 the combined sales of the game and its first two sequels surpassed 500,000. Retrospective reports have called it a bestseller, despite the commercial failure of the PCjr, due to the numerous ports to other platforms.

Reviews of the game were generally positive, and particularly so about the gameplay. A review by Computer Games called it a "revolutionary breakthrough", and Electronic Games similarly said it was a "positive revelation". Reviewers primarily focused on the advances of adding animation and graphics to adventure games, which previously had largely been text-based or relied on static images; Compute! praised the innovation and Family Computing said it was a "giant leap forward". K-Power said that there was "more movement" than any other adventure game, while Tilt said it "combines visual and intellectual delight". Games called it the "most charmingly detailed" game they had seen, and Computer Games and Jeux & Stratégie both said it was like playing a cartoon.

The Family Computing review praised how Roberta retained the charm of her previous games while adding new technical elements, and Tilt and another Electronic Games review also praised how several puzzles had multiple solutions. The reviewers from K-Power and Family Computing said that the game was slow-paced and often very difficult, though Tilt felt that to be a positive trait. Electronic Gaming Monthly, in a review of the Master System version, felt that slowness would not appeal to console game players, though a review of the same version in Power Play said it would be good for beginner players. Electronic Games and Jeux & Stratégie felt that the puzzles on their own were inferior to previous, non-graphical games, with the latter saying that they expected following games to add deeper gameplay to the technical advancement of this one. Whole Earth Review, in a more negative response, felt that despite the game's technical achievements that the game itself was "simple-minded and devoid of humor". Electronic Games and Computer Games both concluded that King's Quest created a new sub-genre of adventure game that was more accessible to new players.

== Legacy ==
Roberta Williams considers King's Quest to be the real beginning of Sierra as a company, as it formed the core of the kinds of games Sierra wanted to make. The game has also been credited with saving the company: a few months after starting on the project, the video game crash of 1983 eliminated much of the company's revenue. Sierra downsized to 30 employees and was in danger of closing. The funding for King's Quest from IBM not only helped keep the company going, but development showcases of the project convinced IBM to invest in additional games and software projects with Sierra, allowing it to re-hire many of the employees it had lost. The reputation effects with retailers from having worked with IBM helped Sierra gain access to stores like ComputerLand that had been hesitant to sell games, and along with the reuse of the AGI engine for projects like the next few King's Quest games and The Black Cauldron (1985) led to success for the company in the following years. The series includes a further seven games by Sierra, beginning with King's Quest II in 1985 and concluding with King's Quest: Mask of Eternity in 1998.

King's Quest has been described as both the start of Sierra's "flagship series" and "practically the progenitor of the graphic adventure genre as we know it". It has been named as the first computer game to have a pseudo-3D world in which players could move an animated avatar around the screen in front of or behind other objects. Japan-based video game journalist Koji Fukuyama said that it created an entirely new kind of adventure game with controllable third-person characters, leading to the point-and-click adventure games that became the foundation for non-Japanese adventure games from the 1990s to the early 2000s. Fukuyama continued that, as the game was not released in Japan, King's Quest had no influence on adventure games made in that country, leading in part to Japanese adventure games taking differing paths. Time named the game as one of the 100 greatest video games in 2012, and in 2015, PC Gamer named it as one of the 50 most important computer games of all time. In 2020, The Strong National Museum of Play inducted King's Quest to its World Video Game Hall of Fame, after previously being nominated in 2018.

In 1988, after the release of King's Quest IV, Silicon Valley Books published The King's Quest Companion, a combination hint guide and novelization by Peter Spear of the games in the series. Updated editions were released through 1997 as further games were released in the series.

Both versions of King's Quest I have been released in several collections of games in the series in the 1990s and 2000s. The SCI version of the game is included in the modern King's Quest Collection on Steam, while the AGI version is in the King's Quest 1+2+3 collection released on GOG.

In 2001, Tierra Entertainment released an unofficial remake of the SCI version of King's Quest I, adding a point-and-click control system from later King's Quest games wherein the player selects preset verbs, represented by pictures, and then selects the subject, rather than typing. It also added high-resolution full color graphics and voice acting, including by Josh Mandel, the voice actor for King Graham in King's Quest V and VI. Elements of the original game were incorporated into the first chapter of King's Quest (2015), "A Knight to Remember", an episodic re-imagining of the series developed by The Odd Gentlemen and published by Activision under the Sierra Entertainment brand name for Microsoft Windows, PlayStation 3, PlayStation 4, Xbox 360 and Xbox One.

== Sources ==
- Levy, Steven (May 19, 2010). Hackers: Heroes of the Computer Revolution (25th Anniversary ed.). O'Reilly Media. ISBN 978-1-4493-9374-8.
- Mills, Shawn (2020). The Sierra Adventure: The Story of Sierra On-Line. Lulu.com. ISBN 978-1-71675-872-0.
- Spear, Peter (1997). The King's Quest Companion (4th ed.). Osborne/McGraw-Hill. ISBN 978-0-07-882401-2.
- Trivette, Donald B. (1988). The Official Book of King's Quest: Daventry and Beyond (PDF) (1st ed.). Compute! Books. ISBN 0-87455-155-2.
- Trivette, Donald B. (1991). The Official Book of King's Quest: Daventry and Beyond (PDF) (2nd ed.). Compute! Books. ISBN 0-87455-245-1.
- Williams, Ken (2020). Not All Fairy Tales Have Happy Endings: The rise and fall of Sierra On-Line. Lulu.com. ISBN 978-1-71672-736-8.
