= IBM PCjr =

Home computer

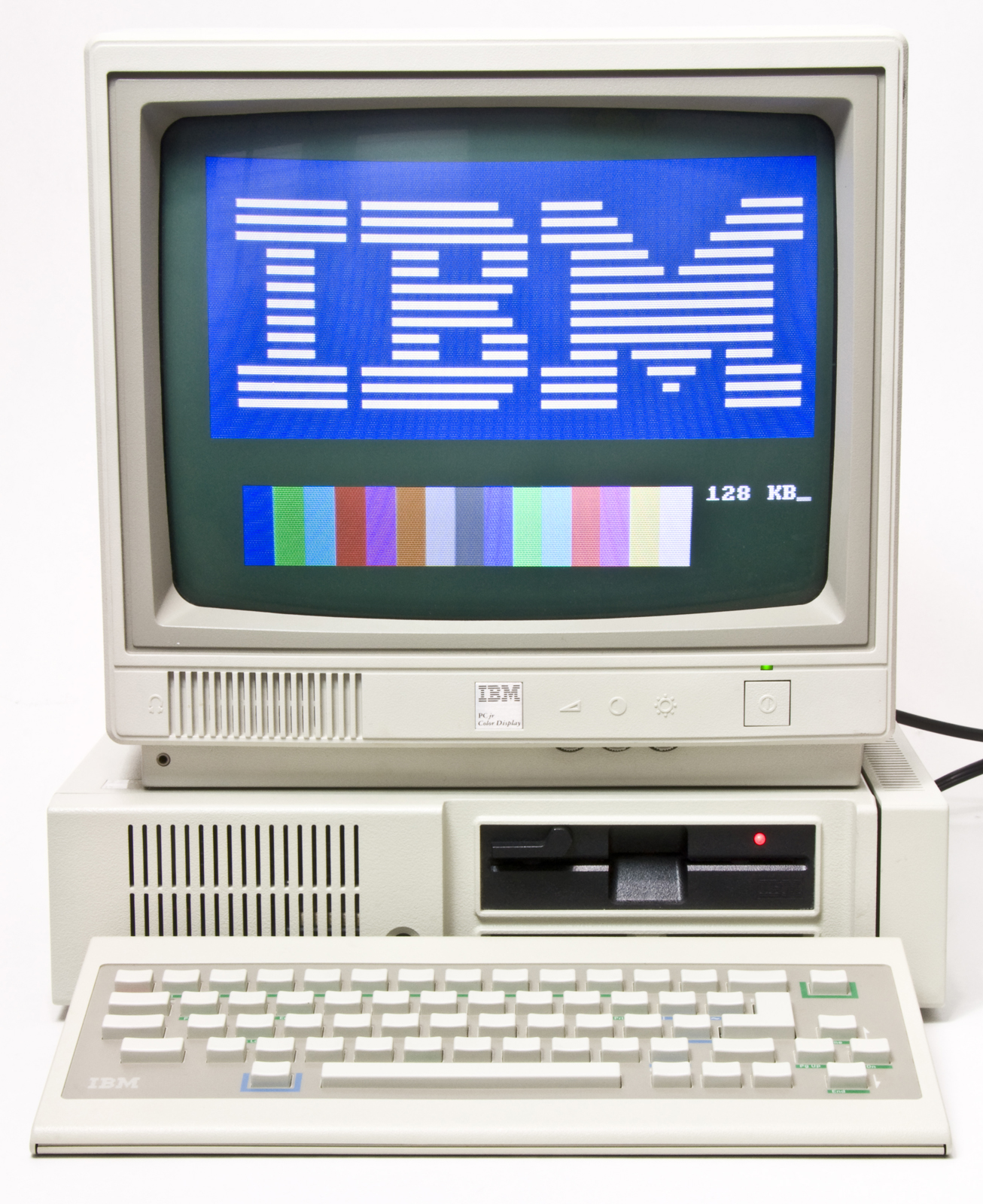
- IBM PCjr with original "chiclet" keyboard, PCjr color display, and 64 KB memory expansion card
- Manufacturer: Teledyne, Lewisburg, Tennessee
- Type: Personal computer
- Released: March 1984; 42 years ago
- Introductory price: US$1,269 (equivalent to $3,930 in 2025) with 128 KB memory and without monitor.; £800 (equivalent to £2,610 in 2025) w/o disk drive.; CA$1,900
- Discontinued: March 1985
- Units shipped: 500,000
- Operating system: IBM PC DOS 2.10
- CPU: Intel 8088 @ 4.77 MHz
- Memory: 64 KB base
- Removable storage: Cartridges, floppy disks
- Display: 12" TTL RGBI monitor, composite video out (TV); 160 × 200 and 320 × 200 at 16 colors, 640 × 200 at 4 colors
- Graphics: Motorola 6845 CRTC, IBM custom Video Gate Array
- Sound: Texas Instruments SN76489, PC speaker
- Predecessor: IBM Personal Computer
- Successor: IBM PS/1

The IBM PCjr (pronounced "PC junior") is a home computer produced and marketed by IBM from March 1984 to May 1985. It was intended as a lower-cost variant of the IBM PC, with hardware capabilities better suited for video games, in order to compete more directly with other home computers such as the Apple II and Commodore 64.

It retained the IBM PC's 8088 CPU and BIOS interface, but provided enhanced graphics and sound, ROM cartridge slots, built-in joystick ports, and an infrared wireless keyboard. The PCjr supported expansion via "sidecar" modules, which could be attached to the side of the unit.

Despite widespread anticipation, the PCjr was ultimately unsuccessful in the market. It was only partially IBM PC compatible, limiting support for IBM's software library. Its chiclet keyboard was widely criticized for its poor quality. The PCjr also suffered from limited expandability; it was initially offered with a maximum of 128 KB of RAM, insufficient for many PC programs.

== Models ==
The PCjr came in two models:

- 4860-004 – 64 KB of memory, priced at US$669 (equivalent to $2,160 in 2025)
- 4860-067 – 128 KB of memory and a 360 KB, 5.25-inch floppy disk drive, priced at US$1,269 (equivalent to $4,100 in 2025)

The PCjr was manufactured for IBM in Lewisburg, Tennessee by Teledyne.

A related machine, the IBM JX, was sold in the Japanese, Australian and New Zealand markets.

== Hardware ==
The PCjr chassis is made entirely of plastic, unlike the all-steel chassis of the IBM PC. A 180/360K floppy disk drive can be installed in a 5.25" front bay. The internal floppy drive is a half-height Qume 5.25" unit; IBM also used these drives in the PC Portable, but the PCjr units were specially equipped with a small fan to prevent overheating, since the computer did not have a case fan.

=== Cartridges ===
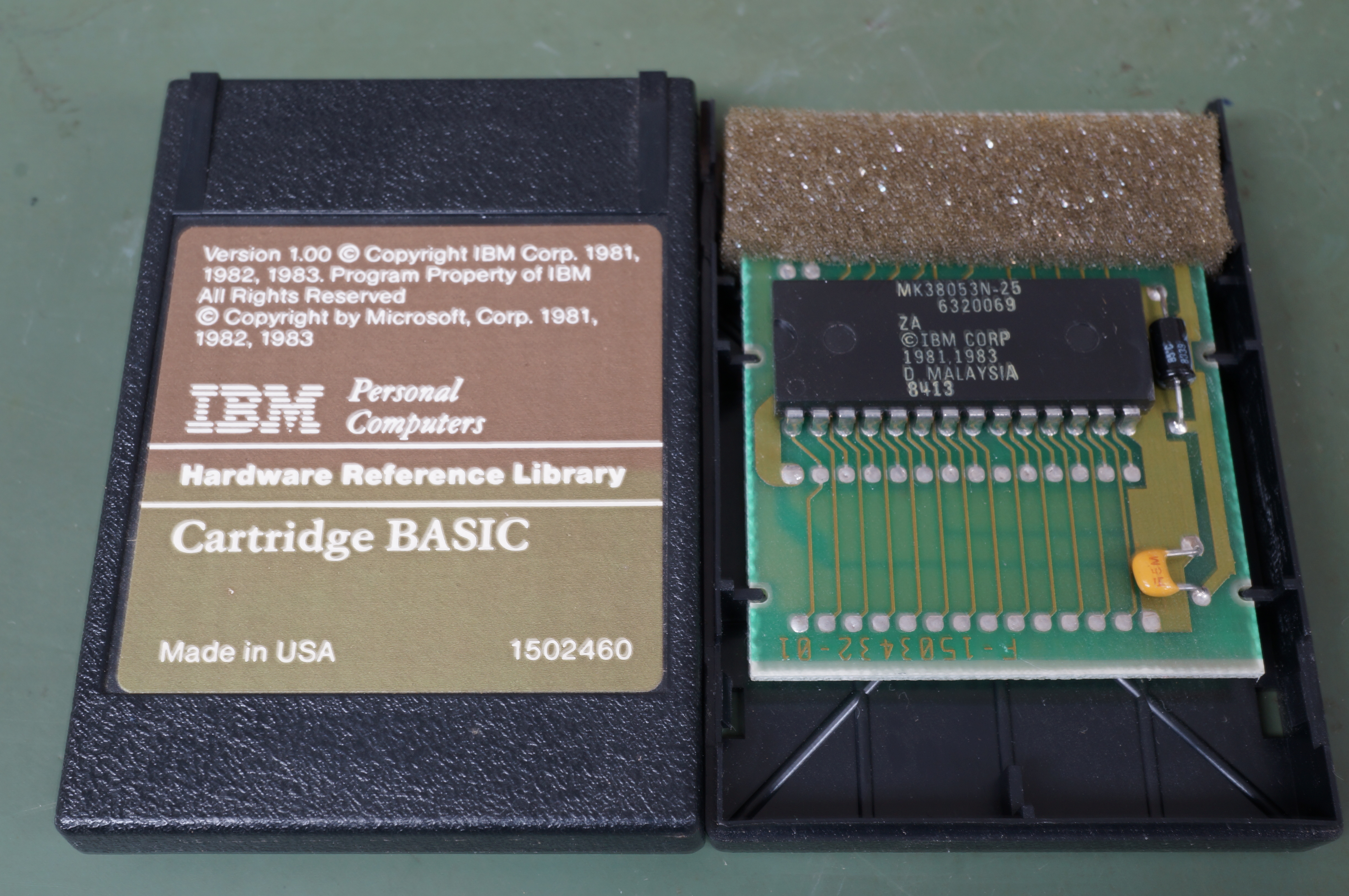
IBM PCjr BASIC cartridge

The front of the PCjr exposes a pair of cartridge slots in which the user can insert software on ROM cartridges, as was common with other home computers. Each cartridge can contain up to 64 KB of ROM. Cartridges can be configured with an auto-restart function; when a cartridge with auto-start enabled is inserted, the machine will restart and boot from the ROM, without requiring the user to reboot manually. PCjr cartridges are strictly read-only, unlike the software cartridges of some other contemporary computers and game consoles, which can also be equipped with read/write memory (RAM) or I/O hardware in a straightforward way.

Cartridges can also replace the system BIOS and other firmware. A number of patches from various vendors are included on a single "combo-cartridge", licensed and sold by PC Enterprises, to support add-on hardware, bypass certain limitations of design, and keep up with changing OS requirements.

=== Processor ===
Like the IBM PC, the PCjr uses an Intel 8088 clocked at 4.77 MHz.

Despite using the same CPU and clock speed, performance is often inferior to the PC, because access to system RAM is delayed by wait states added by the Video Gate Array to synchronize shared access to RAM between the CPU and the video hardware. IBM claimed that an average of two wait states are added, but the designers of the Tandy 1000, a clone of the PCjr, claimed that six was a more accurate number.

This delay only applies to software resident in the first 64 KB or 128 KB of RAM inside the system unit itself, and not to programs or data located in ROM – including software on ROM cartridges plugged into the front of the PCjr – or in additional RAM in a sidecar attachment. Under these circumstances the PCjr should run at full speed. The most common instances in which this maximum speed would be achieved are when running games or productivity applications from ROM cartridges. In fact, because the PCjr video subsystem continuously refreshes the system internal DRAM transparently, without disturbing the CPU, programs running from ROM on the PCjr may actually run slightly faster on the PCjr than on an IBM PC or XT.

=== Video ===
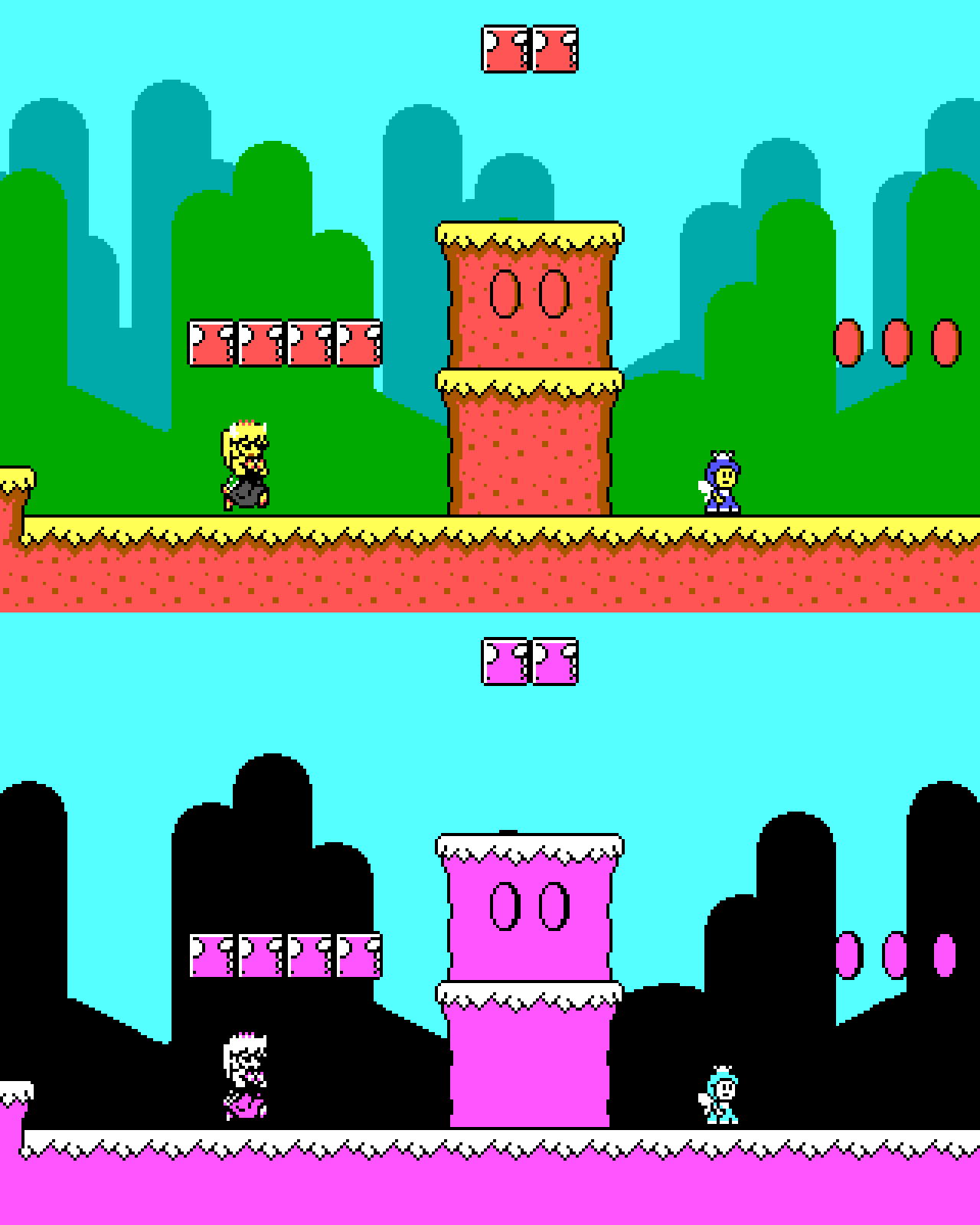
Simulation of PCjr graphics (top) compared to CGA PC graphics of the time (bottom)

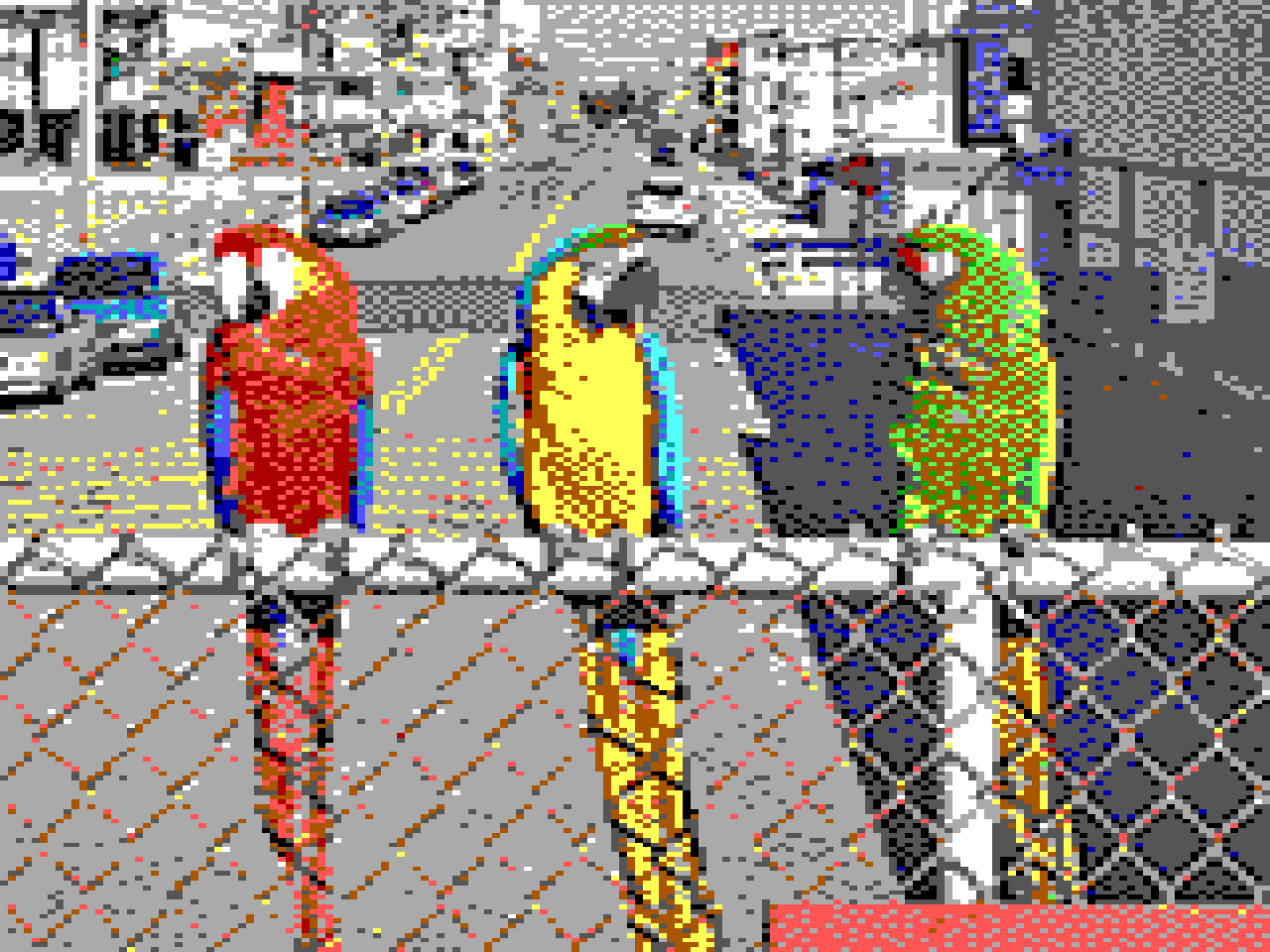
Simulation of PCjr 160 × 200 mode with 16 colors

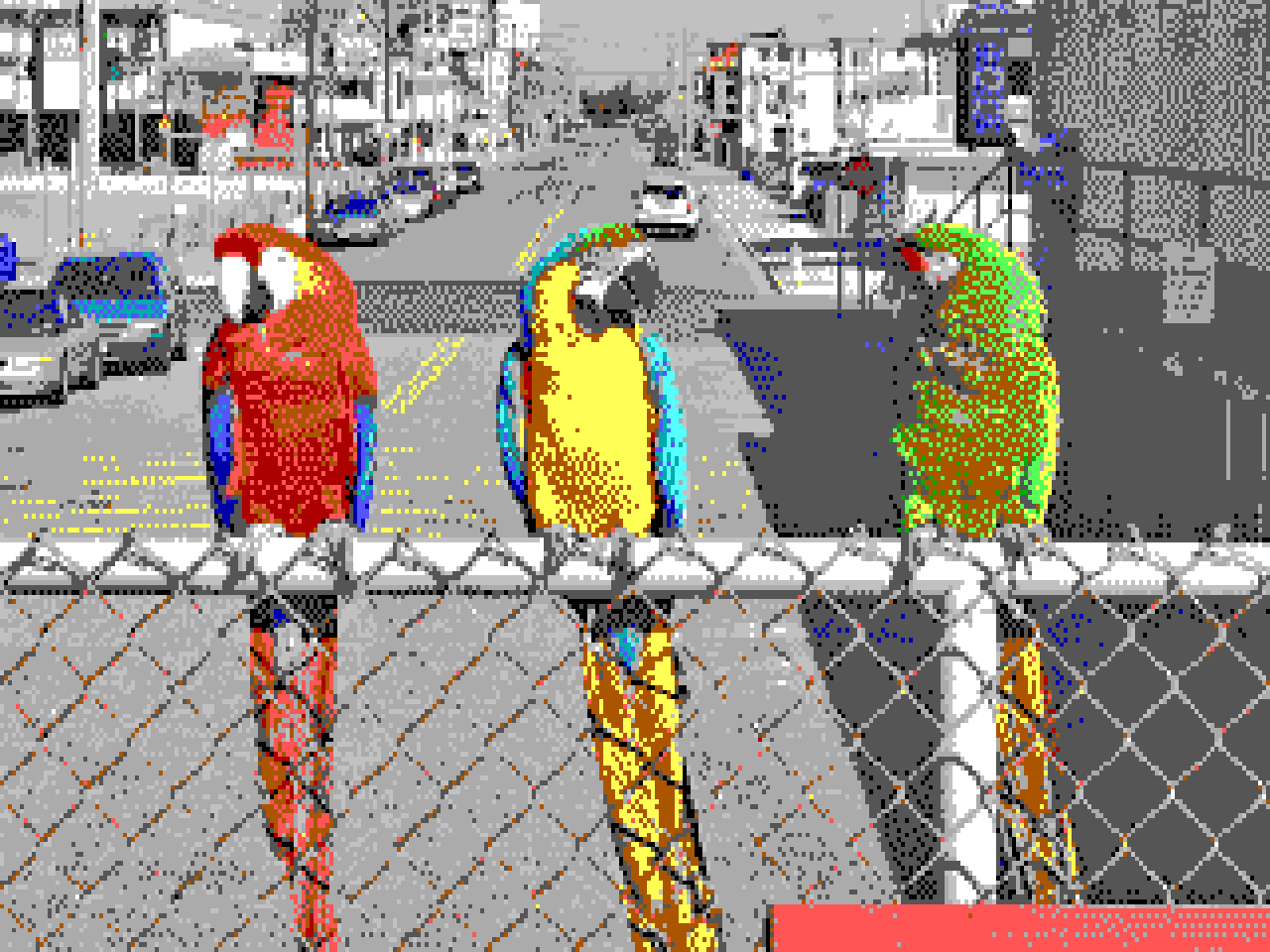
Simulation of PCjr 320 × 200 mode with 16 colors

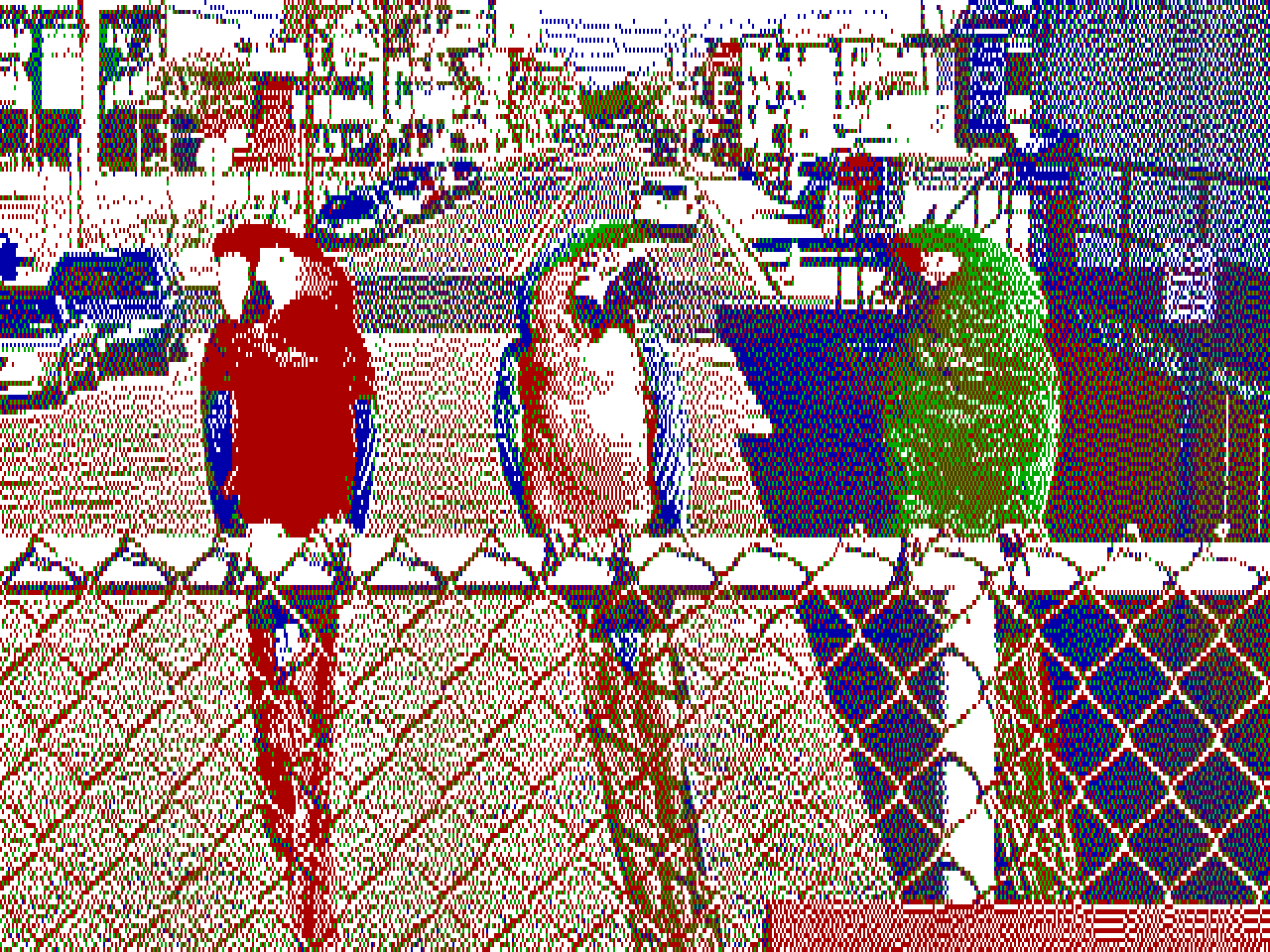
Simulation of PCjr 640 × 200 mode with 4 colors

Unlike the IBM PC, which required a separate video card, the PCjr display hardware was built into the system board. At the time, the only cards available from IBM for the PC were the monochrome MDA and color CGA boards. PCjr graphics were similar to CGA, with several new video modes:

- 160 × 200 at 16 colors
- 320 × 200 at 16 colors
- 640 × 200 at 4 colors

The primary improvement over CGA is the greater color depth. CGA could only display 4 colors in its medium-resolution mode, and 2 colors in high-resolution. The PCjr increases these to 16 and 4 colors respectively.

Video modes on the PCjr use varying amounts of system memory: 40 × 25 text mode uses 1 KB, for instance, while 320 × 200 × 16 and 640 × 200 × 4 use 32 KB. These latter two modes, as well as 80 × 25 text mode, are referred to in documentation as "high bandwidth modes" and are unsupported on base models with only 64 KB of memory.

Multiple text or graphics pages can be used for page flipping as long as there is enough memory, a feature missing from the CGA. The CGA also does not provide a VBLANK interrupt, making it hard to detect when the screen was beginning to be drawn, but the PCjr provides this on IRQ 5, an important feature for smooth page flipping.

The video system also has a "blink" feature which toggles the palette between the first and second groups of eight palette registers at the same rate used for the PCs blinking text attribute, and a palette bit-masking feature that can be used to switch between palette subsets without reprogramming palette registers.

Unlike CGA, PCjr has palette registers which can be used to choose colors from the full 16-color RGBI palette. When the BIOS is used to set a video mode, it sets up the palette table to emulate the CGA color palette for that mode. Programs specifically written to use PCjr graphics can subsequently reprogram the palette table to use any colors desired. Palette changes must be made during horizontal or vertical blanking periods of a video frame in order to avoid disrupting the display (transiently during the palette change).

The monitor included with the PCjr is a 12" TTL RGBI display like those supported by the CGA, but including an internal amplified speaker. Also like CGA, the PCjr supported composite video out for use with a TV or composite monitor.

A Motorola 6845 CRTC like the one used in the MDA and CGA adapters, and a custom IBM chip called the Video Gate Array (VGA) constitute the bulk of the PCjr video hardware. Several discrete standard logic devices complete the video subsystem. The 6845 is responsible for the basic raster timing and video-data address sequencing, and the Video Gate Array contains all the additional timing logic, video-data demultiplexing logic, color processing logic, and programmable palette table logic, as well as the logic for multiplexing RAM access between the 8088 CPU and the video-generation circuitry. For programming, the CRTC is generally compatible with the CGA at the hardware register level. Some other CGA programming details, in particular the Mode Control Register and the Color Select Register (at I/O addresses 3D8h and 3D9h respectively), are not compatible, as the PCjr provides the equivalent functionality through different registers inside the Video Gate Array, which are accessed in a completely different manner through a single I/O address (3DAh).

The 6845 CRTC and the VGA together are responsible for refreshing the internal DRAM of the PCjr, which complicates the process of switching video modes on the PCjr. Resetting the VGA, which must be done during certain video-mode switches, must be done by code not running from the system RAM controlled by the VGA, and if the CRTC or the VGA is disabled for too long, the contents of the internal RAM can be lost. Additional external DRAM (in sidecar expansion modules) is refreshed independently and never affected by a video-mode switch.

Of the three new modes, 160 × 200 × 16 mode has the same layout as CGA graphics modes; the odd and even scanlines are stored in the first and second half of the video buffer, each half being 8k in size, and every four bits represent one pixel. The 320 × 200 × 16 and 640 × 200 × 4 modes have four blocks of scanlines; every four or two bits respectively represent a pixel.

Since the PCjr uses the main system RAM for the video buffer, less memory is available for software than on a standard PC, which has separate dedicated video memory in the A000h–BFFFh segments, above conventional memory.

=== Sound ===
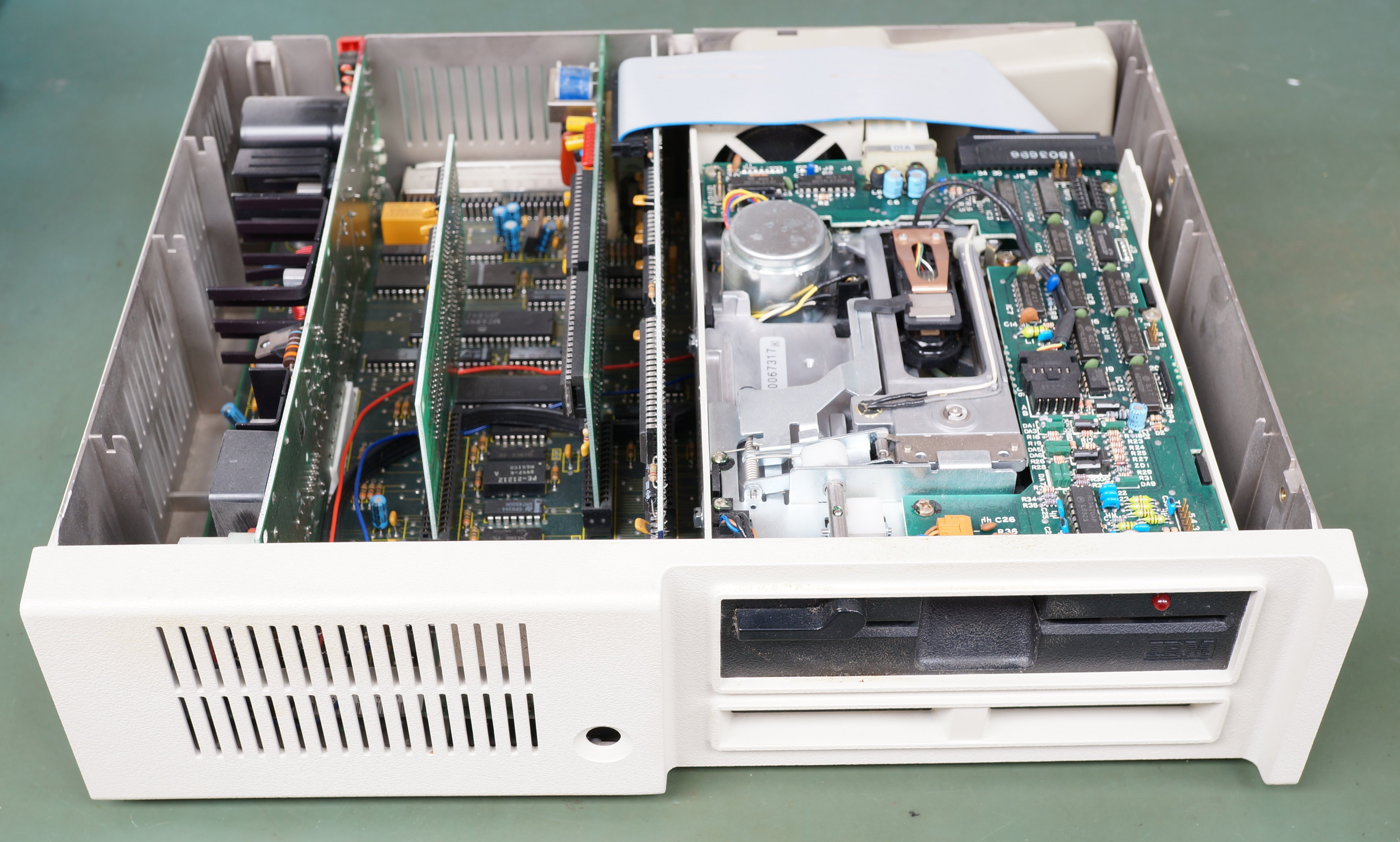
IBM PCjr internals

The PCjr's sound is provided by a Texas Instruments SN76496, which can produce three square waves of varying amplitude and frequency along with a noise channel powered by a shift register. It is similar to the programmable sound generator chips used in game consoles such as the Master System and the ColecoVision. The PCjr design also allows for an analog sound source in an expansion-bus "sidecar" module, and a software-controlled internal analog switch can select the source for the sound output from among the PC speaker, the SN76489, the cassette port, or the expansion-bus sound source. Only one sound source can be selected at a time; the sources cannot be mixed.

=== Keyboard / lightpen ===
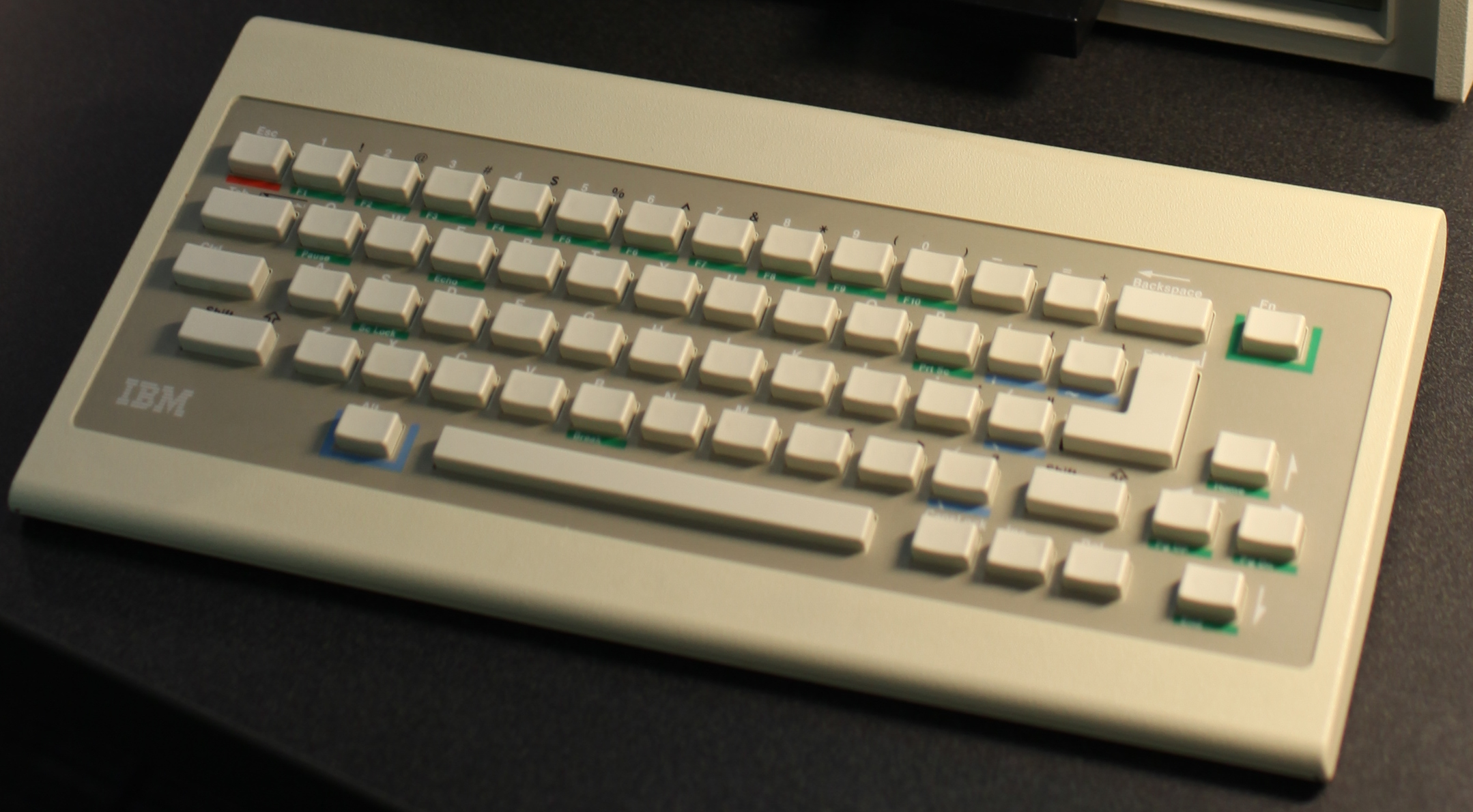
The wireless PCjr keyboard

The original keyboard included with the PCjr was a wireless design using infrared line-of-sight communication, which IBM initially marketed as the "Freeboard". This is a chiclet keyboard with small, flat, calculator-style plastic keycaps. The keycaps are blank, with the labels printed between keys, so that overlays can be used. The PCjr keyboard has 62 keys rather than the 83 of the PC keyboard, and the remaining keys must be entered by holding a modifier key.

For infrared wireless operation, the keyboard is powered by four AA cells. Certain types of room lighting can cause interference with the infrared keyboard sensor, and multiple keyboards cannot be used wirelessly in the same room without problems.

IBM sold a cable that could be plugged in between the keyboard and computer if the user wanted a more reliable connection, which also eliminated the need for batteries, since the keyboard IR receiver is automatically disabled when the cord is attached to the computer.

The chiclet design was not well received, and in 1984 IBM began shipping a new design, still wireless, but using more conventionally shaped keycaps.

The PCjr also has a light-pen port. Besides being used for a light pen (a rarely purchased option), this port can be used in combination with the serial port to supply voltage to a Mouse Systems optical mouse of the same design as those for Sun workstations.

=== Expansion ===
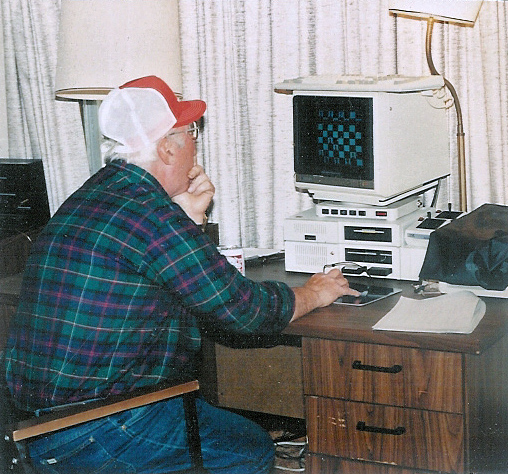
A PCjr featuring most upgrades available from PC Enterprises, including combo cartridge, dual floppies, twin ST-225 HDDs (bootable via Future Domain firmware hidden under cover on right). Replacement keyboard sits on top of a Taxan RGB monitor displaying Battle Chess.

The back of the machine does not have any expansion slots. Instead, several permanently mounted, proprietary connectors provide attachment to many built-in hardware capabilities, which replaced many of the features that PC expansion cards provided, including:

- Graphics hardware
- Multichannel sound
- Joystick ports
- Light-pen interface
- Serial port
- Cassette interface

Internally the PCjr did have expansion slots to support specific upgrades: a RAM upgrade, a modem, and a floppy drive.

On the right side of the machine, the system bus was exposed for use with "sidecars" – upgrade modules which attached to the side of the machine. Third-party manufacturers produced a number of expansion units for the PCjr.

== Software ==
The primary OS for the PCjr is PC DOS, like the IBM PC, and it supports a large amount of PC software, with some incompatibilities.

PC DOS 2.10 is the minimum version of DOS required for the PCjr. IBM's OEM versions of MS-DOS supported the machine up to DOS 3.30, but memory expansion was required for DOS 3.20 and 3.30.

Like the original PC, the PCjr has BASIC in ROM, but includes Cartridge BASIC instead of Cassette BASIC. In addition to cartridge support, it extended the standard IBM BASIC with commands to support the new video and audio functionality. The system will boot into Cartridge BASIC if no cartridge or boot disk is present.

=== Compatibility ===
The register mapping of the PCjr's video hardware is different from the IBM CGA card, so software that tries to modify or read registers directly will not work. The PCjr has a "gate" register to which software writes the number of the video register to be accessed, followed by the value to be written into it. Alteration of other CRTC registers cannot be assumed to produce the same results from the PCjr video system as from the CGA.

Programs for the CGA that manipulate the CRTC start address and that rely on address wrap-around above address 0xBC000 may not work correctly on the PCjr because it always has a 32 KB contiguous block of RAM in the video area from address 0xB8000 through 0xBFFFF. The PCjr's video memory cannot be moved above 128 KB if expansion memory is added, so some PC software on self-booting disks do not work on a PCjr if the software requires more than 128 KB of RAM.

The floppy controller on the PCjr also maps its I/O registers into different ports from the PC, and since the PCjr does not have DMA, the BIOS routines for handling floppy access are different from and more complex than those on the PC. Software that tries to perform direct, low-level disk access (mainly utilities, but also the occasional game such as Dunzhin: Warrior of Ras) do not work unless rewritten for the PCjr.

== History ==
IBM's first home computer was the PC, released in 1981. Within two years the PC had created a large new ecosystem of hardware and software, nearly leading the home computer market with 26% of all microcomputers sold in 1983, second only to the much less expensive Commodore 64.

For a year before the PCjr's announcement, the computer industry discussed rumors of a new IBM product, code named "Peanut", that would repeat the PC's success. The rumors described Peanut as a home computer with 64 KB of memory that would be IBM PC compatible, benefit from IBM's service network and, at US$600 to US$1,000, be less expensive than the Apple IIe. IBM repeatedly denied these rumors, but customers visited stores attempting to buy the product, and rivals' revenue, product plans, and share prices reacted to the officially nonexistent computer in what the press called "Peanut Panic" or "The Great Peanut Roast".

By September 1983, books and magazine articles on Peanut were ready for publishing, with only a few changes needed once the still officially nonexistent computer appeared. Software companies prepared to market products as "Peanut compatible" with the computer of which, rumors said, IBM would produce 500,000 units in the first year. Adweek estimated that IBM would spend $75 million on marketing, including an alleged license of Charles Schulz's Peanuts characters. Smalltalk magazine in August published a detailed article on the computer, stating that it would cost $600 plus $400 for a disk drive, use a color TV as a display, and have a standard typewriter keyboard.

=== Announcement ===
IBM announced the PCjr on November 1, 1983, at its New York City headquarters with an enormous amount of advance publicity, including live news coverage of the event.

Experts predicted, according to The Washington Post, that the PCjr would "quickly become the standard by which all other home computers are measured" and estimated sales of one million or more in 1984, expecting the PCjr to change the home-computer market in a similar way to how the IBM PC had changed the business-microcomputer market. They predicted that the PCjr would extend IBM's dominance, with customers able to use the company's computers in the home and in the office. Texas Instruments left the market four days before IBM's announcement, after losing US$223 million in nine months against Commodore by selling its TI-99/4A for as low as $99.

Developers began creating PCjr software in 1982. Sierra On-Line, SPC, and The Learning Company were among those that produced games, productivity, and educational software as launch titles, using detailed IBM production outlines under a policy of strictly enforced security.

The PCjr's graphics and sound features were superior to the PC's, and PC Magazine speculated that "the PCjr might be the best game machine ever designed". Prominent among launch titles was Sierra's graphical adventure King's Quest I, much of whose $850,000 budget was paid by IBM.

=== Release and reception ===
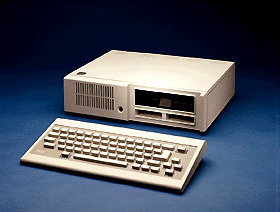
The PCjr's chiclet keyboard was unpopular.

The PCjr was released in March 1984, missing the 1983 Christmas sales season due to production delays.

Even prior to release, anticipation of the machine was mixed. Ziff Davis, publisher of the successful PC Magazine, printed the first issue of PCjr Magazine before the first units shipped, and competing computer magazines included Peanut, PCjr World, jr, and Compute! for the PC and PCjr. However, as new information became available about the machine, retailers became deeply concerned about its marketability.

When the PCjr became widely available in March 1984 sales were below expectations. Consumer interest was reportedly high until demonstration machines were available, at which point interest dropped steeply. Dealers reported that consumers disliked the price, keyboard, and limited memory, and retailers that sold primarily to business customers did not know how to market it.

The press soon reported that the PCjr could embarrass IBM, with executives reportedly worrying about demand. Stores began discounts while vendors slowed plans to release products. IBM admitted that demand for the PCjr was not growing as rapidly as expected. By May 1984 it had only sold 10,000 units, while other companies were reported to be slow in developing software for the system.

In response to the surprising lack of interest, IBM began early discounts of up to US$370 in June, lowering the two models' prices to $599 and $999, but many of its dealers could not sell their initial shipments of 25 computers each. IBM allowed them to postpone paying for inventory for 180 days, but inventory continued to pile up. By August the PCjr was being described as a flop.

In 2006 PCWorld ranked the IBM PCjr as 13th "worst tech products of all time".

=== Issues ===
One of the most significant complaints about the PCjr was its chiclet keyboard, which was described as unsuitable for serious typing and "nearly useless". The lack of direct function keys was a pain point for word processing.

==== Cost ====
The PCjr's cost was its biggest disadvantage, even more so than the keyboard. The price was perceived as too high for a home computer, yet the PCjr was not powerful enough to be a business machine. IBM's lack of clear messaging on their target market (home, schools, or executives working at home) made it difficult for software developers, consumers, and dealers to prepare for the product. The price was perceived as targeting a market that did not exist. IBM was surprised to learn that many of the initial customers for the PCjr were not home users, as they assumed, but instead businesses who wanted a cheaper PC that took less space on a desk.

IBM failed to recognize that many consumers wanted a computer more sophisticated than those that cost less than $500, but did not want to spend more than $1,000. The PCjr offered no compelling reason to spend that much. The PCjr cost more than twice as much as the C64 and the Atari 8-bit computers, while inferior to both for videogames. Spinnaker, a game developer, stated that they discontinued development for the PCjr when they learned of the actual price.

Consumers were reportedly much more excited about the also-new Macintosh 128K, which was more sophisticated but only cost US$300 more, with accessories and software. The Macintosh reportedly outsold the IBM product during their first two months on the market. The PCjr's price was close to that of the Coleco Adam, but the Adam also included a tape drive, a printer, and software. A realistic cost including peripherals was $2,000 and other configurations cost $3,000 or more.

Apple IIe was the PCjr's most direct competition. Although the PC outsold it, Apple sold almost 110,000 units in December 1983, in part to customers who had waited until details of the PCjr became available. Apple estimated that 80% of its dealers sold IBM and Apple computers, and many visitors who were disappointed by the PCjr, or curious about the Macintosh, reportedly left with a IIe instead. The latter was so popular that a shortage occurred in early 1984.

The US$669 PCjr model compared favorably to a $1,400 IIe also with 64 KB and no floppy drive, but Apple lowered their computer's price as part of a "Starter System" package, with monitor and floppy drive, to a price as low as $1,300, plus a 30% discount for the important education market. In April 1984 Apple introduced the Apple IIc, a portable version with a more compact form factor, 128 KB of RAM, and a floppy drive. Although the PCjr's CPU was superior, the IIc—which Apple did not describe as a home computer, to avoid the "game machine" connotation—had an excellent keyboard and was compatible with the Apple II's enormous software library.

==== Not completely PC compatible ====
By early 1984, PC compatibility was vital for any new, non-Apple computer's success. IBM had expected that most customers in the market would be new to computers, but 75% of PCjr customers used an IBM PC at work. Three quarters of the market were familiar with computers and wanted to run business software on the PCjr. An important market was executives who took data home to work on applications such as Lotus 1-2-3, and Peanut had been rumored to be fully PC compatible, so many customers visited stores believing that the PCjr could run most PC software.

IBM's intent was for the PCjr to be perceived as a unique platform, like most other home computers, and their documentation stated it was "a different computer than the PC", but with "a high level of programming compatibility". Nonetheless, potential customers perceived it as a variant of the PC, not a unique platform. While many PC applications do run on PCjr, compatibility issues exist with software that use more than 128 KB of RAM or require more than one floppy disk drive.

Thousands of PC applications do require more than 128 KB of memory and two disk drives, making the PCjr incompatible with about 60% of software by some measures, including the popular word-processing program WordStar and Lotus 1-2-3, common applications used to test PC compatibility. IBM's own DisplayWrite was released as a unique PCjr version. A four-line BASIC program that runs on the IBM PC can crash PCjr, mystifying even Peter Norton. These compatibility limitations made the computer unsuitable for taking work home, although a PCjr variant of 1-2-3 was eventually released.

Ultimately, the PCjr was perceived as not having a killer app to make up for these limitations. Software incompatibility made it inadequate as a business machine, but poor performance with arcade-style games made it inadequate as a games machine.

==== Limited hardware expansion ====
Computer dealers quickly identified the PCjr's limited hardware expansion capability as another major disadvantage. ROM cartridges have small storage capacity, requiring, for instance, two cartridges and a floppy disk for the PCjr version of Lotus 1-2-3, which also has difficulty fitting complex spreadsheets into 128 KB of RAM. IBM published technical details for the PCjr, as it had done for the IBM PC, to encourage third parties to develop accessories, but did not offer a second floppy drive, hard drive, or memory beyond 128 KB.

While multiple sidecar expansion units can be attached, they are bulky, and the computer requires additional power supplies to support a second floppy drive or more than one sidecar. IBM advised against adding more than four sidecars. The PCjr also lacks a DMA controller, so the 8088 CPU has to service floppy disk transfers directly, causing the system to momentarily freeze while accessing a disk. The PCjr also cannot use modems faster than 2400 baud.

=== Response to poor sales ===
By mid-1984, the PCjr had experienced months of bad publicity, and dealers were panicking. Sales were poor and falling each month before rising slightly with the June discounts, and each dealer sold an average of 15 units total in the first half of the year. Apple sold almost as many IIc computers on its first day as PCjr since introduction.

IBM downplayed complaints about the keyboard, but in July announced that it would replace the chiclet keyboards, for free, with a new model with conventional typewriter-style keys. This was perceived as unusually generous even for IBM, especially within the computer industry. By spending $5 million to replace 60,000 keyboards, IBM acknowledged that the original models were a mistake and confirmed the computer's poor sales compared to original estimates.

In August 1984, IBM began a massive advertising campaign, which ran through the end of the year. They reduced the PCjr's list price, offering a US$999 package meant to be superior to the comparably priced Apple IIe and IIc, and they introduced new IBM-made memory expansion options to bring the machine to 512 KB. As part of $32.5 million in advertising for the computer during 1984, it began what the company described as the most extensive marketing campaign in IBM history, in which 98% of Americans would see at least 30 PCjr advertisements in the last four months of the year. Three simultaneous bundled software promotions, a sweepstakes with Procter & Gamble, and direct mail to more than 10 million people marketed the redesigned computer, while deemphasizing the PCjr's role as a home computer and emphasizing PC compatibility. Advertisements listed the new price, "new typewriter-style keyboard", standard 128 KB of memory and expansion options, the PCjr version of 1-2-3, and the ability to "run over a thousand of the most popular programs written for the IBM PC". A $500 rebate to dealers let them include a free color monitor with the discounted PCjr.

Despite widespread skepticism, what became known as the "Save-the-Junior campaign" succeeded in the short term. Sales rose every month from June (1.9 units sold per store) to September (4.2), and many dealers reported selling more in the weeks following the changes than in the previous seven months. The more expensive model now cost the $800 to 900 that had originally been expected prior to release. With the new hardware options and lower prices, consumers could buy a PCjr for $1,000 less than a comparable PC, and slightly less than an Apple IIe.

The PCjr reportedly became the best-selling computer, outselling the Apple IIe and IIc by four to one in some stores and even the C64. As sales reached an estimated 50 per store in December, dealers increased inventories, and Tecmar resumed production of PCjr peripherals after retailers suddenly began ordering its products again.

=== Discontinuation ===
By January 1985, IBM had sold an estimated 240,000–275,000 PCjrs, 200,000 of which were sold in the fourth quarter of 1984. When the discounts ended, however, sales decreased abruptly, and inventories began to stack up again. By this time, three PCjr-specific magazines had ended their publications with significant losses. IBM was unable to meet the demand for its new PC AT business microcomputer, but the home-computer market was in decline, and the company was likely unable to make a sufficient profit when selling the PCjr at a discount.

IBM discontinued the PCjr on March 19, 1985, stating that "The home market didn't expand to the degree I.B.M. and many observers thought it would". The surprise decision by IBM's CEO John Akers astounded software developers, some of which only made PCjr products. Rumored to have 100,000 to 400,000 unsold PCjrs despite not having ordered new microprocessors from Intel since summer 1984, the company offered large discounts to its employees, schools, and the public. Inventory remained through Christmas 1985, and IBM used discounts as well as radio and full-page print ads to try to sell off remaining stock. Dealers said that they would not accept IBM's unusually attractive payment terms, because stores already had large inventory they were unable to sell.

== Legacy ==
The PCjr was a successful product. The problem was that it only sold a few hundred thousand a year. Anybody else would love to have a product that sells a few hundred thousand a year. But that's a disaster when you plan to sell a million, million and a half a year.

— John V. Roach, Tandy Corporation CEO, 1988

The press widely covered the failure of the PCjr. Although the machine's failure had little effect on IBM's revenue ($46 billion in 1984), discontinuing such a prominent product embarrassed IBM. The failure was so great that it was compared to the Edsel and New Coke, and Oracle Corporation mocked a rival's product as being PCjr compatible. IBM reportedly created a Chiclet rule, requiring human factors testing for future products.

Some analysts speculated that IBM's bureaucratic culture, so different from that of the less-rigid Boca Raton division that created the PC, had resulted in the failure, while others thought that the absence of IBM's cautious and thorough bureaucrats had caused it. Don Estridge said that their mistake had been to expect that first-time computer users would buy a PCjr. It was perceived by developers that IBM had entered the market without doing any research.

Tandy Corporation released a clone, the Tandy 1000, in November 1984, describing it as "what the PCjr should have been". After the PCjr's discontinuation, Tandy quickly removed any mention of it in advertising, while emphasizing the 1000's PC compatibility. The machine and its many successors sold well, unlike the PCjr, partly because the Tandy 1000 was sold in ubiquitous Radio Shack stores and partly because it was less costly, easier to expand, and almost entirely compatible with the IBM PC. The PCjr's enhanced graphics and sound standards became known as "Tandy-compatible", and many PC games advertised their Tandy support. One company developed a PCjr modification that made it compatible with Tandy software.

Ultimately, the PCjr's failure was attributed to its lack of PC compatibility. As PC clones became widely available at prices as low as $600, less than the price of the Apple IIc, consumers began purchasing DOS computers for the home in large numbers, and these inexpensive clones succeeded with consumers where the PCjr had failed, by being as fast as, or faster than the IBM PC while still being highly compatible.

Several upgrades for the PCjr were designed by IBM/Teledyne but never reached store shelves before the PCjr was canceled. These included a wireless joystick and various memory and drive upgrades. PC Enterprises became the last of the major third-party vendors to supply full service, parts, and add-ons, extending the functional life of the PCjr to about 10 years, often buying out inventory and rights for PCjr support.

Other manufacturers provided support items for PCjr fans, such as hard-drive attachments and specialized sidecars that the user could use to enhance the system. The PCjr was able to run other software designed for the PC, such as word processor, database and spreadsheet programs ran well on the PCjr with 128 KB of memory. When fully expanded to over 600 KB memory, the PCjr would run most IBM PC software.

IBM returned to the home market in 1990 with the PS/1. Unlike the PCjr, the PS/1 offered full PC compatibility, a low price, and a conventional keyboard.

== Timeline ==
Timeline of the IBM Personal Computer

Asterisk (*) denotes a model released in Japan only
