= The Coles =

Video game designers

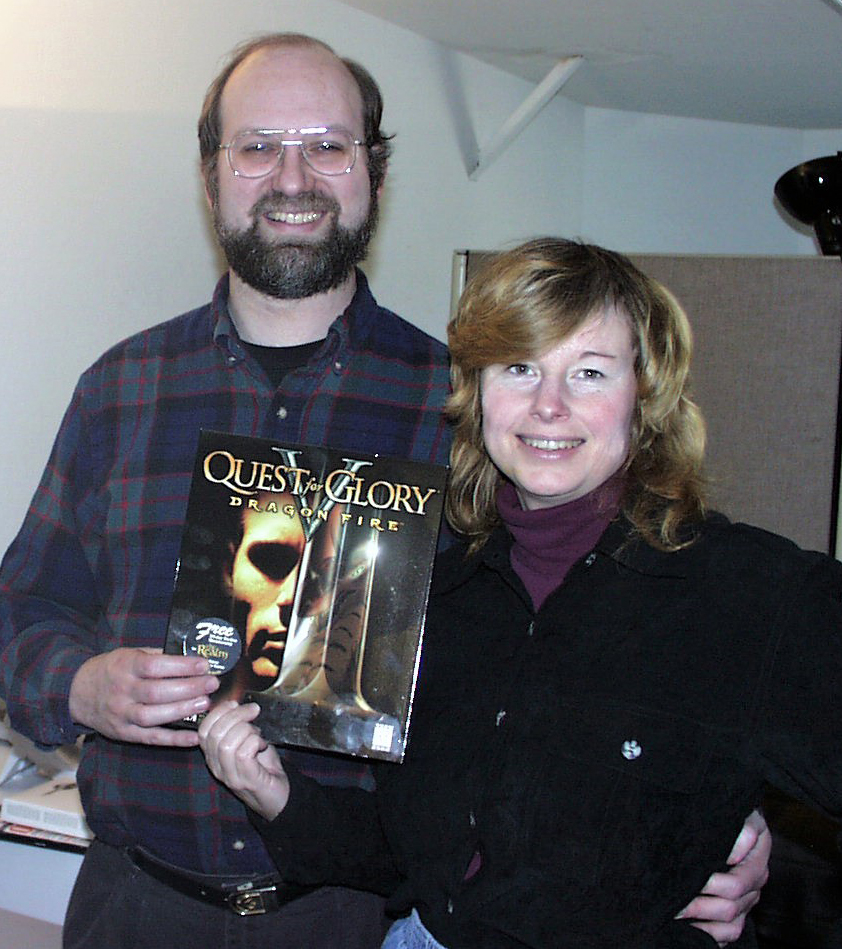
- At Yosemite Entertainment in 1998
- Known for: Quest for Glory
- Spouses: Lori Ann Cole; Corey Cole
- Website: hero-u.com

The Coles is a colloquial term referring to Corey Cole and Lori Ann Cole, a husband and wife team (married 1982) who are both video game designers. Working together they designed the Quest for Glory series. They have also each designed games independently.

They formed Far Studio, which was the developer of Shannara and is now used for art and web development. They also formed a studio called Transolar Entertainment, which is the developer of the adventure- RPG hybrid Hero-U: Rogue to Redemption.

== Corey Cole ==
Corey Stuart Cole (born 27 November 1955 in Santa Monica) is an American game designer, programmer, and writer who co-created various iterations of the SCI engine, co-designed the first four games in the Quest for Glory series with his wife, and designed and directed Castle of Dr. Brain.

=== Biography ===
Corey Cole is an avid Dungeons & Dragons fan, playing the game for 10 years before joining Sierra, and ultimately selling one role-playing module to Judges Guild. At that time he and his wife, Lori Cole published The Spell Book, a role-playing game newsletter. They ran fantasy campaigns for years that had a unique rule system that later became the core of their Quest for Glory games.

=== Career at Sierra ===
Corey Cole started his programming career at Sierra On-line in 1988, porting the SCI engine to Atari ST. He later co-programmed new iterations the SCI engine for use in many Sierra games during much of his tenure at Sierra.

He began his career as a game developer, alongside his wife Lori Ann Cole, with Hero's Quest (which was later renamed Quest for Glory) in 1989. He wasn't credited as co-developer of the game, but he was acknowledged as such by the games industry. Computer Gaming World recognized both Corey Cole and Lori Ann Cole as the game's designers when they awarded Hero's Quest the Adventure Game of the Year award. He and his wife were co-designers of the next three games in the Quest for Glory series as well.

He designed the puzzle adventure game Castle of Dr. Brain, the first game in the Dr. Brain series, in 1991. The series is notable for being Sierra's only property to be licensed for use in television, as the Children's Television Workshop licensed it for use in their programming on December 9, 1993.

After being included in the major 1994 Sierra layoff, Corey returned in 1997 to work on Quest for Glory V, which was released in 1998. Corey did not take a development role on the game, but he did serve as a programmer. That same year, a photograph of his face was used as a head shot for a character in Police Quest: SWAT 2. Corey's final role at Sierra was as a programmer on Hoyle Casino. which was released in 2000.

=== Games ===
- 1989 Space Quest III: The Pirates of Pestulon - Atari ST port (Sierra)
- 1989 Quest for Glory: So You Want to Be a Hero - programmer, Atari ST port (Sierra)
- 1990 King's Quest I: Quest for the Crown - development system programming (Sierra)
- 1990 Quest for Glory II: Trial by Fire - designer, programmer, development system programming (Sierra)
- 1990 King's Quest V: Absence Makes the Heart Go Yonder - development system programming (Sierra)
- 1990 Hoyle's Official Book of Games Volume 2 - development system programming (Sierra)
- 1990 Conquests of Camelot: The Search for the Grail - development system programming (Sierra)
- 1991 Space Quest IV: Roger Wilco and the Time Rippers - development team (Sierra)
- 1991 Mixed-Up Mother Goose - development system programming (Sierra)
- 1991 Mixed-Up Fairy Tales - lead programmer (Sierra)
- 1991 Jones in the Fast Lane - development system programming (Sierra)
- 1991 Conquests of the Longbow: The Legend of Robin Hood - development system programming (Sierra)
- 1991 Castle of Dr. Brain - designer, director, programmer (Sierra)
- 1992 Quest for Glory I: So You Want to Be a Hero - co-designer
- 1992 Quest for Glory III: Wages of War - co-designer, voice actor (Sierra)
- 1993 Quest for Glory: Shadows of Darkness - co-designer, co-director, co-writer (Sierra)
- 1993 Hoyle's Classic Card Games - additional bridge programming (Sierra)
- 1995 Shannara - co-designer, programmer (Far Studio)
- 1998 Quest for Glory V: Dragon Fire - RPG and system software engineer (Sierra)
- 1998 Police Quest: SWAT 2 - photograph model for a character (Sierra)
- 2000 Hoyle Casino - programmer (Sierra)
- 2018 Hero-U: Rogue to Redemption - co-designer (Transolar Games)
- 2023 Summer Daze: Tilly's Tale - producer (Transolar Games)

== Lori Ann Cole ==
Lori Ann Cole (née Armbruster) is an American game designer, director and writer who co-designed the first four Quest for Glory series with her husband, designed Quest for Glory V: Dragon Fire, and designed and directed Mixed-Up Fairy Tales. She is also a voice actor, voicing Queen Isabella in King's Quest V: Absence Makes the Heart Go Yonder!.

=== Biography ===
Cole's varied background includes elementary education, film animation, and writing. She is a fanatic role-playing video game player who became involved in game designing because of her husband's involvement in Sierra On-line.

=== Career at Sierra ===
Lori Ann Cole co-designed the Quest for Glory series with her husband Corey Cole. She was the sole designer of the final chapter, Quest for Glory V, although her husband was a programmer for that game.

She was also the designer of the second and final game in Sierra's Mixed-Up children's adventure game series, Mixed-Up Fairy Tales. While at Sierra, she also was a voice actor, voicing Queen Isabella in the CD-ROM version of King's Quest V.

After Sierra downsized in 1994, Lori returned the following year as the sole designer of Quest for Glory V, which was released in 1998. That same year, a photograph of her face was used as a head shot for a character in SWAT 2.

=== Games ===
- 1989 Quest for Glory: So You Want to Be a Hero - director, writer (Sierra)
- 1990 Quest for Glory II: Trial by Fire - co-designer, FACS Manual Writer (Sierra)
- 1990 King's Quest V: Absence Makes the Heart Go Yonder - voice actor (Queen Isabella) (Sierra)
- 1991 Mixed-Up Fairy Tales - designer, director (Sierra)
- 1991 Castle of Dr. Brain - additional material (Sierra)
- 1992 Quest for Glory I: So You Want to Be a Hero - director, co-designer
- 1992 Quest for Glory III: Wages of War - co-designer, director, writer, voice actor (Sierra)
- 1993 Quest for Glory: Shadows of Darkness - co-designer, co-director, co-writer (Sierra)
- 1995 Shannara - co-designer, writer (Far Studio)
- 1998 Quest for Glory V: Dragon Fire - designer, documentation writer (Sierra)
- 1998 Police Quest: SWAT 2 - photograph model for a character (Sierra)
- 2018 Hero-U: Rogue to Redemption - co-designer (Transolar Games)
- 2023 Summer Daze: Tilly's Tale - director, writer (Transolar Games)

== Far Studio/Transolar Games ==
Since Sierra didn't give the Quest for Glory V team the budget and time that the Coles felt the game needed, they decided to create games for other publishers. As a result, they formed a mini company called FAR Productions (named for the property they lived on, Flying Aardvark Ranch) and created Shannara for Legend Entertainment in 1995.

In 2003, Corey and Lori decided to make a game based on a book that she was co-writing that was never published called How to Be a Hero. After losing the website named after the book after running it for three years, they decided to rename the idea School of Heroes. They originally planned to make the game a text adventure, which Corey programmed using Inform, but they were not satisfied with the feel of the game and put it aside. At the same time, they decided to create a website to promote the book. Corey programmed the interactive parts of the site, which would automate the original How to Be A Hero website's theme of allowing users to become "students" and complete "assignments". They planned to expand the site into a full interactive game, but those ideas never materialized.

In late 2011, the Coles decided to stop taking assignments at School of Heroes and instead make the idea into a game. On October 19, 2012, after the success from successful projects by fellow Sierra alumni and at the encouragement of fans, Lori Ann and Corey Cole launched a Kickstarter for 2D adventure RPG based on that idea, Hero-U. Hero-U: Rogue to Redemption was published by Transolar Games in 2018.

== Recognition ==
Computer Gaming World awarded Corey and Lori Ann Cole (and producer Guruka Singh Khalsa) the Adventure Game of the Year award for Hero's Quest in 1990.
