= Mark Seibert =

American musician (born 1960)

- Born: 1960 (age 64–65); California, U.S.
- Occupation(s): Musician, producer

Mark Seibert (born 1960) is an American musician, composer, and producer best known for his work on various video games from Sierra Entertainment.

== Biography ==
Seibert was born in California, U.S. From 1979 to 1986, he performed guitar and vocals for a Christian band called Omega Sunrise. He recorded two albums with the group in 1983 and 1985, the second of which saw moderate success in various US markets. After a final concert in Fresno, California in 1986, the group broke up due to the demands of constant touring.

Mark Seibert claims he is most proud of his compositions in Phantasmagoria (1995). He obtained his Bachelor of Arts in music at California State University, Fresno in 1983, and also started on a second degree in Math in 1986. As of 2014, he was working as a mathematics teacher at the Perry Hall Christian School in Maryland.

In 1987, Seibert answered a newspaper advertisement from a computer game company called Sierra On-Line. After several months of delay, the company hired him as a musician and music editor for King's Quest IV: The Perils of Rosella. He worked as a musician on this and other projects, but after only a few years, he was promoted to the company's music director. This meant that he worked with staff musicians in both composition and editing.

In 1992, he was promoted again to producer, which meant he was involved in all aspects of game production, not just the music. However, this also meant that he was less able to actually compose music, though he did continue to perform pieces by other composers. He left the company in 2001.

Despite having produced numerous adventure games over his career, in a 1997 interview Seibert said that though he likes the genre, he had never played one through to the end: "I always get halfway through and get stuck someplace, and then I have to download the walk-through off the Internet and read the solution, and it's always like, 'Well that's a stupid puzzle!' I get so frustrated, I throw it down and never pick it back up."

Later he went to work for Gentle Revolution Software as the Director of Development. He worked with NASA on a game centered around the International Space Station.

He has been married to Debbie Seibert since 1980. They have two daughters (Kirsten - b. 1991, Kaitlin - b. 1994).

== Video game soundtracks ==
- Police Quest II: The Vengeance (1988)
- Quest for Glory: So You Want to Be a Hero (1989)
- Codename: Iceman (1989)
- Conquests of Camelot: The Search for the Grail (1989)
- King's Quest V: Absence Makes the Heart Go Yonder! (1990)
- Mixed-Up Mother Goose (enhanced CD-ROM version) (1992) (with Amenda-Lombardo and Ken Allen)
- King's Quest VI: Heir Today, Gone Tomorrow (1992) (wrote and produced "Girl in the Tower", a remix of a theme heard in the previous game where he was the composer.)
- Conquests of the Longbow: The Legend of Robin Hood (1993) (also music director)
- Phantasmagoria (1995) (also Producer and singer of the ending song "Take a Stand")
- Leisure Suit Larry: Love for Sail! (1996) (also Producer and Sound Effects)

== Other works ==
- Feel the Change (with Omega Sunrise) (1983)
- Run from the Night (with Omega Sunrise) (1985)
- The Long Shot (Sequencing and Sequence Editing) (1988)
- King's Quest IV: The Perils of Rosella (1988) (Musician/Editor)
- Space Quest III: The Pirates of Pestulon (1988) (Musician/Editor)
- Silpheed (1988) (Music Editor)
- Firehawk: Thexder The Second Contact (1990) (Music Director)
- Leisure Suit Larry 3: Passionate Patti in Pursuit of the Pulsating Pectorals (1989) (Music/Sound Programming)
- Hoyle's Official Book of Games: Volume 1 (1989) (Music Director)
- King's Quest I: Quest for the Crown (1989) (VGA remake) (Music Director)
- Oil's Well (1990) (Music Director)
- Police Quest III: The Kindred (1990) (Music Director)
- Quest for Glory II: Trial by Fire (1990) (Music Director)
- Hoyle's Official Book of Games: Volume 2 (1990) (Music Director)
- Hoyle's Official Book of Games: Volume 3 (1991) (Music/Sound Programming)
- Space Quest IV: Roger Wilco and the Time Rippers (1991) (Music Director, Voice Actor (CD-ROM))
- EcoQuest: The Search for Cetus (1991) (Music Director)
- Castle of Dr. Brain (1991) (Music Director/Musician)
- Space Quest I: Roger Wilco in the Sarien Encounter (1991) (VGA remake) (Music Director)
- Leisure Suit Larry in the Land of the Lounge Lizards (VGA remake) (1991) (Music Director)
- Leisure Suit Larry 5: Passionate Patti Does a Little Undercover Work (1991) (Music/Sound Programming)
- Mixed-Up Fairy Tales (1991) (Music Arrangement/Performance)
- Quest for Glory I: So You Want to Be a Hero (VGA remake) (1992) (Music Director)
- Police Quest: In Pursuit of the Death Angel (VGA remake) (1992) (Music Director)
- Jones in the Fast Lane (Enhanced CD-ROM Version) (1992) (Director)
- Laura Bow: The Dagger of Amon Ra (1992) (Music Director)
- The Island of Dr. Brain (1992) (Music Director)
- Take-a-Break! Pinball for Windows (Musician) (1993)
- Pepper's Adventures in Time (1993) (Producer/Musician)
- The Shadow of Yserbius (boxed version) (Producer)
- Gabriel Knight: Sins of the Fathers (1993) (Sound)
- Quest for Glory III: Wages of War (1993) (Music Director)
- Outpost (1994) (Musician)
- King's Quest VII: The Princeless Bride (1994) (Producer/Musician)
- Torin's Passage (1995) (Producer)
- Leisure Suit Larry: Love for Sail! (1996) (Producer/Musician)
- King's Quest: Mask of Eternity (1998) (Director/Producer/Musician/Co-designer)
- Arcanum: Of Steamworks and Magick Obscura (2001) (Executive Producer)
- Throne of Darkness (2001) (Producer)
- SpaceStationSim (2004) (Director of Development)
