= Hoyle's Official Book of Games =

- Genres: Playing cards, board games, puzzles
- Developers: Sierra Entertainment (1996–2003); Encore, Inc. (2005–2016)
- Publishers: Sierra Entertainment (1996–2003); Encore, Inc. (2005–2016)
- Platforms: Windows, Macintosh, Amiga, Atari ST, MS-DOS, Dreamcast, Game Boy Color
- First release: Hoyle's Official Book of Games: Volume 1; 1989
- Latest release: Hoyle Official Casino Games Collection; 2016

Hoyle's Official Book of Games (later Hoyle Classic, Hoyle Card Games, or the Hoyle Series) is a series of video games released from 1989 to 2016. They were initially developed and published by Sierra On-Line. The series focuses on playing cards, but has also included board games, puzzles, dice, and dominos.

The series is named after 18th century playing card expert Edmond Hoyle, but some titles in the series also used trademarks and designs from the Hoyle brand of playing cards under license from Brown & Bigelow. Early games had a volume numbering and included humorous computer opponents drawn from other Sierra video game series. Later titles saw yearly releases or specialized in particular types of games. It spawned a spin-off series dedicated to casino table games and machines called Hoyle Casino in 1996.

Encore Software took over publishing the series from 2005 to 2016, leading to the development of their own Encore Classic Games series in 2020.

== Volume 1 ==
Hoyle's Official Book of Games: Volume 1
- Developer: Sierra On-Line
- Publisher: Sierra On-Line
- Platforms: MS-DOS, Classic Mac OS, Amiga, Atari ST
- Release: NA: 1989
- Genre: Card game
- Mode: Single-player

Hoyle's Official Book of Games: Volume 1 was the first card game simulator in the series, and a spiritual sequel to Sierra's Hi-Res Cribbage (1981). It included five multi-player card games and the Klondike variant of Solitaire (Patience). The Hoyle trademark and facecards were used under license from Brown & Bigelow.

=== Games ===
The games included are: Crazy Eights, Old Maid, Hearts, Gin Rummy, Cribbage, and Klondike.

=== Characters ===
For all games, except the last, the player could choose opponents, each having their own AI and manner of playing. These opponents included historical figures, members of Sierra staff, and characters from Sierra games.

When the player took too long making a decision, the characters started having dialogues, each according to his background. For example, Leisure Suit Larry begins to comment about women, while Roger Wilco wants to escape the game to save the universe again.

- Sonny Bonds
- Bulldog
- Cassie
- Christina
- Devin
- Diane
- Colonel Henri Dijon
- King Graham
- The Kid
- Larry Laffer
- Shelly LeBlanc
- Lenny
- Jerry Moore
- Princess Rosella
- Warren Schwader
- Sol Silverman
- Thelma
- Roger Wilco

=== Development ===
The original concept was submitted to Ken Williams (CEO/Founder of Sierra On-Line) by Warren Schwader. Once the project was greenlit, Warren acted as the Lead Programmer as well as the Game Designer. The games were programmed using Sierra On-line's proprietary scripting language: Sierra Creative Interpreter (SCI). SCI was originally created to aid in the development of Sierra's core line of adventure games. Working with SCI to implement card games and to code artificial intelligence for the characters proved challenging.

Warren Schwader continued as the Lead Programmer and Game Designer for the next two games in the series. Rob Atesalp was the composer and sound designer for the original and next two games.

=== Reception ===
The game sold over 250,000 copies by 1990.

== Volume 2 ==
Hoyle's Official Book of Games: Volume 2
- [[File:[Hoyle2.png|frameless|upright=1]]
- Developer: Sierra On-Line
- Publisher: Sierra On-Line
- Platforms: MS-DOS, Classic Mac OS, Amiga, Atari ST
- Release: NA: 1990
- Genre: Card game
- Mode: Single-player

Hoyle's Official Book of Games: Volume 2 is the next volume in the Hoyle card games simulator series by Sierra Entertainment. This time, the pack offered 28 games, as opposed to the first volume's six. The other main difference between the two was that all the games were solitaire variants, so there was no option for choosing opponents. Consequently, the game did not feature any Sierra characters for co-players.

The 28 solitaire games offered are: Calculation, Strategy, Eagle Wing, Beleaguered Castle, Klondike, Canfield, Golf, Flower Garden, Scorpion, Spiderette, La Belle Lucie, Fortress, Baker's Dozen, Bristol, Eight Off, Shamrocks, Yukon, Eliminator, Slide, Bowling, Nestor, Aces Up, Gaps, Penguin, Pyramid, Triplets, and Poker Square.

== Volume 3 ==
Hoyle's Official Book of Games: Volume 3
- Developer: Sierra On-Line
- Publisher: Sierra On-Line
- Platforms: MS-DOS, Amiga
- Release: NA: 1991
- Genre: Board game
- Mode: Single-player

Hoyle's Official Book of Games: Volume 3 was the third volume in Sierra On-Line's series of computer games based on the officially licensed Hoyle rules and trademark. Unlike the two previous games, this one was made with Sierra's new improved VGA engine, and focused on board games, where the previous entries in the series had featured card games.

The games included are Backgammon, Checkers, Dominoes, Yacht (the original ancestor of the trademarked game Yahtzee), Pachisi, and Snakes and Ladders.

=== Characters ===
Like the first volume, and unlike the second volume, this game offers Sierra characters as opponents in the various games.

They do not interact with each other or have conversations as in the first game, but several of them have themed comments, catch phrase or accented style comments (though these are uncommon). For example, the Sheriff may refer to himself as the "Great Nottingham", or Baba Yaga who refers to her opponents as 'dearie'. Some characters are more specific than others, and some are more generic. It also depends on the game, a character might have more interesting things to say about plays in one game, but have generic comments to say in another.

Good guys

- Mother Goose (Mixed-Up Mother Goose)
- King Graham (King's Quest series)
- Rosella (King's Quest series)
- Larry Laffer (Leisure Suit Larry series)
- Passionate Patti (Leisure Suit Larry series)
- Jones (Jones in the Fast Lane)
- Sonny Bonds (Police Quest series)
- Roger Wilco (Space Quest series)
- Laura Bow (The Colonel's Bequest and The Dagger of Amon Ra)

Evil guys

- Ad Avis (Quest for Glory II)
- Baba Yaga (Quest for Glory I)
- Lillian (The Colonel's Bequest)
- Arnoid (Space Quest III)
- Mordack (King's Quest V)
- Mr. Big (Leisure Suit Larry V)
- Lolotte (King's Quest IV)
- Vohaul (Space Quest II)
- Sheriff of Nottingham (Conquests of the Longbow)

== Hoyle Classic Card Games (Hoyle 4) ==
Hoyle Classic Card Games (Hoyle 4) was a remake of Volume I, released with VGA support, speech and original soundtrack. There was a set with 'Classic Characters' to play with and another with Sierra characters, some of whom returned from Volume 3. Load screens involved a silly comments made by the Classic characters, in relationship to whatever game was loading. The number of games was increased to eight, with the inclusion of Contract Bridge and Euchre.

Some digitized speech was implemented, with a total of five unique expressions in full speech (such as reactions to a play and responses to a compliment or taunt) for each character. There are a few additional text based messages in theme for each character for some of the games, but they only relate to the gameplay (characters do not have conversations with each other outside of the scope of the game). All the artwork and character sprites look like old fashioned and sepia-toned.

Classic characters:

- Dinky
- Scout
- Crazy Jack
- Trudy
- Josephine
- Billy Joe
- Chip
- Winthorp
- Fairbanks

Sierra characters:

- King Graham
- Pepper
- Willy Beamish
- Larry Laffer
- Quarky
- Laura Bow
- Adam
- Roger Wilco
- Dr. Brain

== Hoyle Classic Games (Hoyle 5) ==
The first CD-ROM version of the game (1995), has over 30 characters to choose from including 'animated', 'icon', and 'business'.

=== Characters ===
Animated

- Jeb
- Leopold
- Natasha
- Stella
- Luke
- Sam
- Capt. Barnes
- Beatrice
- Dorothie
- Toby
- Finnian

Business

- Noel
- Lance
- Beverly
- Rose
- Sharon
- Roger
- Jim
- Heidi
- Kate
- Maxwell
- Phillip

== Other games in the series ==
By the mid 1990s, new versions of the game were published yearly, with some variants for particular types of games. All these releases are for PCs, unless otherwise specified.

- Hoyle Casino series (1996–2016)
- Hoyle Children's Collection (1996)
- Hoyle Classic Solitaire (1996, 1998)
- Hoyle Classic Board Games (1997)
- Hoyle Bridge (1997)
- Hoyle Card Games (1997, 1999, 2000, 2001, 2002, 2003, 2004, 2005)
- Hoyle Board Games (1998, 1999, 2000, 2001, 2002)
- Hoyle Battling Ships & War (1998)
- Hoyle Bridge & Euchre (1998, 1999)
- Hoyle Hearts & Spades (1998, 1999)
- Hoyle Classic Games 2 (1999)
- Hoyle Word Games (1999, 2000, 2001)
- Hoyle Backgammon & Cribbage (1999)
- Hoyle Solitaire and Mahjong Tiles (1999, 2000)
- Hoyle Crosswords (1999)
- Hoyle Card Games (Game Boy Color; 2000)
- Hoyle Kids Games (2000, 2001)
- Hoyle Mahjong Tiles (2000)
- Hoyle Puzzle Games (2002, 2003)
- Hoyle Table Games (2003)
- Hoyle Majestic Chess (2003)
- Hoyle Puzzle & Board Games (2004)
- Hoyle Backgammon (2006)
- Hoyle Enchanted Puzzles (2008)
- Hoyle Children's Collection (2007)
- Hoyle Puzzle & Board Games (2008, 2009)
- Hoyle Card Games [2010] (2009)
- Hoyle Card Games [2012] (2011); re-released as Encore Classic Card Games (2020)
- Hoyle Puzzle & Board Games [2012] (2011); re-released as Encore Classic Puzzle & Board Games (2020)
- Hoyle Classic Board Games Collection series (2012–2015)
- Hoyle Official Card Games Collection (2015); re-released as Encore Card Games Collection (2019)

== Collections ==
- Xplosiv (2001)

Board, Card, Casino

- Hoyle Game Collection (2001)

Includes Hoyle Board Games, Hoyle Card Games, Hoyle Texas Hold'Em, and Hoyle Slots & Video Poker.

- Hoyle Collection (2003)

Card, Casino

- Hoyle Games 2003 (2003)
- Hoyle Classic Games Pack: Fun for the Whole Family (2003)

Includes Hoyle Classic Games 2, Hoyle Slots/Video Poker, Hoyle Solitaire/Mahjong, and Hoyle Friday Night Poker.

- Hoyle Card, Puzzle & Board Games (2013)

Includes Hoyle Card Games (2012) and Hoyle Puzzle & Board Games (2012)

- The Ultimate Hoyle Anniversary Collection (2013)

Includes Hoyle Card Games (2012), Hoyle Casino Games (2012), Hoyle Slots (2009) and Hoyle Puzzle & Board Games (2012)

== Reception ==
Computer Gaming World stated that interacting with Sierra characters in Volume 1, such as Leisure Suit Larry and Princess Rosella was fun, but annoying for those who preferred cards to humor. It criticized Volume 1 for slow performance and cribbage's deviation from the official Hoyle's rules, and stated that the other games were "really children's games and offer no great excitement".
