= Throne of Darkness =

2001 video game

Throne Of Darkness
- North American cover art
- Developer: Click Entertainment
- Publisher: Sierra On-Line
- Producer: Mark Seibert
- Designers: D. Isaac Gartner; Ben Haas
- Programmer: D. Isaac Gartner
- Artists: Ben Haas; Victor Lee
- Composers: Etienne Grunenwald-Rohr; Mark Hardy
- Platform: Microsoft Windows
- Release: NA: September 25, 2001; EU: September 28, 2001
- Genres: Action role-playing, hack and slash
- Modes: Single-player, multiplayer

Throne of Darkness is a Japanese-themed action role-playing game released in 2001 by Sierra On-Line, a subsidiary of Vivendi Universal Interactive Publishing. Players control up to four (out of seven) different samurai at a time. The game has three separate multiplayer modes which support up to 35 players.

== Plot ==
The game is set in Yamato, a medieval version of Japan ruled by the shogun Tsunayoshi and the daimyō of the four clans. To become immortal, Tsunayoshi transforms himself into the demon Zanshin, the Dark Warlord, who unleashes his army of darkness to conquer Yamato. Zanshin's forces sweep across Yamato one night, catching the clans by surprise and annihilating them. However, believing that the four daimyō were killed, Zanshin recalls his soldiers prematurely, leaving one daimyō and seven of his retainers alive. As dawn breaks, the daimyō decides to counterattack, ordering his seven surviving samurai to destroy Zanshin and his minions.

The four clans and daimyō are named after historical Japanese clans and persons:

- The Mōri clan, led by daimyō Mōri Motonari.
- The Oda clan, led by daimyō Oda Nobunaga.
- The Tokugawa clan, led by daimyō Tokugawa Ieyasu.
- The Toyotomi clan, led by daimyō Toyotomi Hideyoshi.

== Gameplay ==
Gameplay resembles Diablo II, as many of the game's developers worked on Diablo.

== Reception ==
Reception

Aggregate score
| Aggregator | Score |
|---|---|
| Metacritic | 68/100 |

Review scores
| Publication | Score |
|---|---|
| AllGame | 2.5/5 |
| Computer Games Magazine | 1/5 |
| Computer Gaming World | 3.5/5 |
| EP Daily | 9/10 |
| Game Informer | 6.5/10 |
| GameRevolution | A− |
| GameSpot | 7.1/10 |
| GameSpy | 68% |
| GameZone | 9.5/10 |
| IGN | 7.5/10 |
| Next Generation | 3/5 |
| PC Gamer (US) | 78% |
| RPGFan | 85% |

The game received "average" reviews according to the review aggregation website Metacritic. Blake Fischer of NextGen said that the game was "Fun but frustrating. Ultimately, the steep learning curve (formations? Don't even ask...) and increased micromanagement keep this game from being a 'Diablo II killer.'"

The game was a finalist for The Electric Playground's "Best RPG for PC" award at the Blister Awards 2001, but lost the prize to Arcanum: Of Steamworks and Magick Obscura.
