= Quest for Glory: Shadows of Darkness =

1993 video game

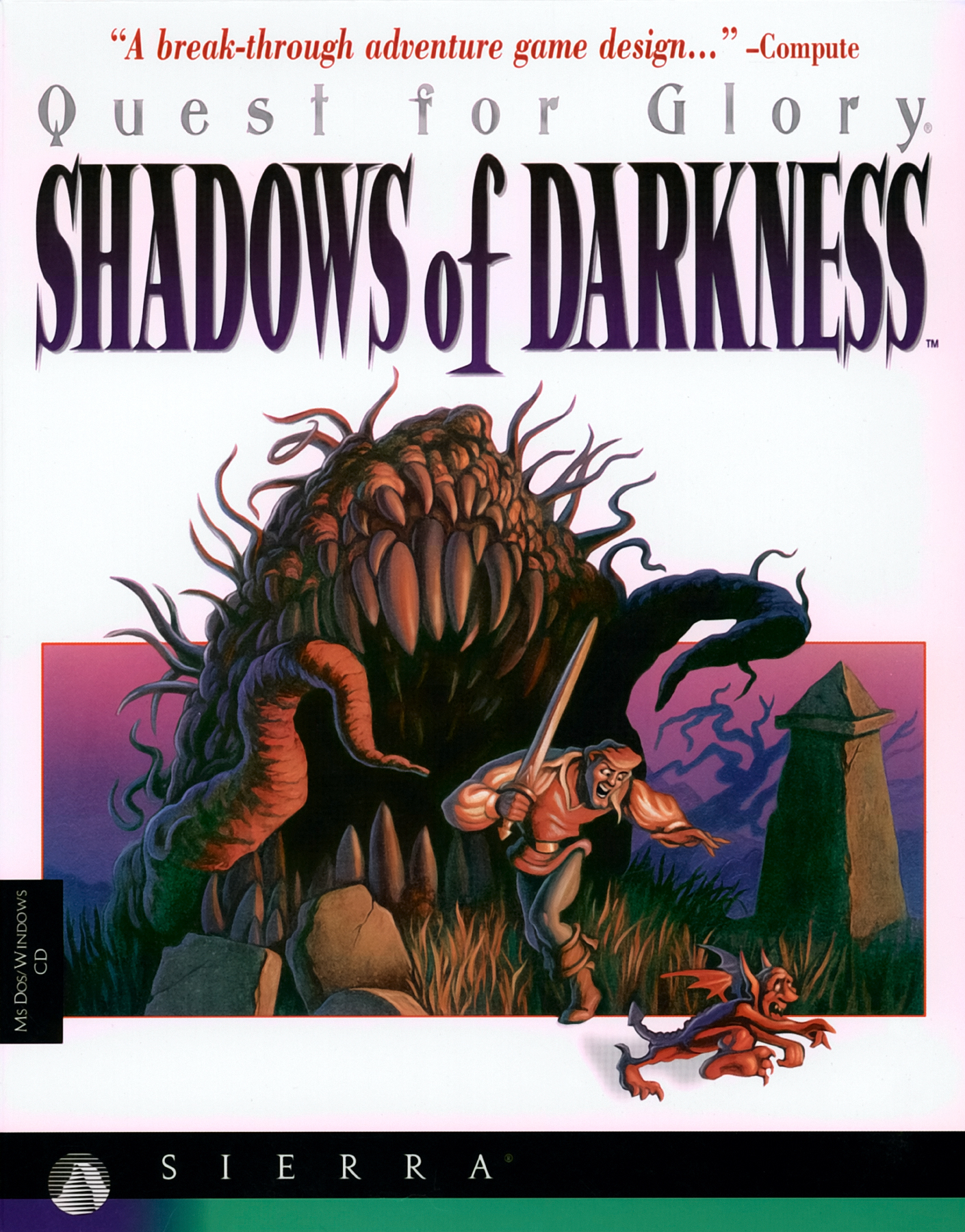
- CD-ROM version cover art
- Developer: Sierra On-Line
- Publisher: Sierra On-Line
- Producer: Oliver Brelsford
- Designers: Lori Ann Cole; Corey Cole
- Programmer: Henry Yu
- Artist: Marc Hudgins
- Writers: Lori Ann Cole; Corey Cole
- Composer: Aubrey Hodges
- Series: Quest for Glory
- Platforms: MS-DOS, Windows
- Release: December 1993 (floppy); September 1994 (CD)
- Genre: Adventure/role-playing
- Mode: Single-player

Quest for Glory: Shadows of Darkness is an adventure game/role-playing video game hybrid. It is the fourth installment of the Quest for Glory computer game series by Sierra On-Line. It was the first and only game of the series to drop the numerals from the title.

== Plot ==
Talking with Katrina. Typical gameplay for Quest for Glory IV.

Shadow of Darkness follows directly on the events of Quest for Glory III: Wages of War. Drawn without warning from victory in Fricana, the Hero arrives without equipment or explanation in the middle of the hazardous Dark One Caves in the distant land of Mordavia, a world full of undead that is "a mix of Slavic folklore and Lovecraftian horror". Upon escaping from the closing cave mouth, he meets a mysterious young woman named Katrina who assists him again several times in his journey. The Hero helps the townspeople with their problems. He encounters several old foes, including the not-quite-dead Ad Avis and the ogress Baba Yaga, and makes several bizarre new allies. The Hero is ultimately coerced into assisting Ad Avis' Dark Master in collecting the Dark Rituals that will allow Avoozl the Dark One (a Cthulhu pastiche, and most likely a reference to the Slavic deity Chernobog) to manifest in Mordavia's world. Naturally, the Hero escapes this control and thwarts their plan, destroying Ad Avis in the process. During the celebration of the Hero's somewhat pyrrhic victory, the wizard Erasmus appears, along with his familiar Fenrus, summoning the Hero to the land of Silmaria.

== Gameplay ==
The gameplay continued with Quest for Glory III's graphical, point-and-click interface, and also introduced a new combat system, which introduced a sideways perspective of the fights, and allowed players to check an option to let the computer fight the battles for them.

== Development ==
Quest for Glory IV features darker themes while maintaining the humor of previous games through such methods as incorporating Boris Karloff and Peter Lorre parodies. Revolving around a dark cult summoning an unfathomably large evil, the game was a far cry from earlier villains such as Baba Yaga. Additionally, the undead and Lovecraftian monsters differed significantly from the lighter monsters of earlier games (there were, however, vampiric rabbits reminiscent of Monty Python and the Holy Grail). The game was inspired by gothic fiction, "old horror movies and books about vampires and werewolves".

Development for the game ran late, which forced Sierra to ship the game with inadequate testing. The first version of the game, which appears on floppy discs, is "almost unplayable"; however, the following year's re-release of the game on CD was much improved because a programmer had had a year to address the problems. The GOG digital re-release has since resolved many of the remaining bugs. According to one of the game's directors, Corey Cole, Quest for Glory IV was developed with a budget of $750,000.

A particularly detailed sequence in the game involved the Gypsy Magda gathering information about the hero's future and his possible enemies or allies using a deck of Tarot cards. The images used for the game were taken from the Russian tarot of St. Petersburg, a Rider–Waite–Smith clone deck, and the layout used appears to be unique to the game, though it is partially akin to the beginning of a Celtic cross layout.

Shadows of Darkness was developed with SVGA graphics.

The CD-ROM version of Quest for Glory IV is the first game in the series to feature voice actors. The most notable voice actors for the game are John Rhys-Davies as the Narrator, Jennifer Hale as Katrina, and Bill Farmer as Leshy. Additionally, the game featured a largely original sound track by Aubrey Hodges – although it did feature a reprise of the Hero's Theme from previous games and a rendition of "Anitra's Dance" by Edvard Grieg, which plays as background music in the Hotel Mordavia.

According to an InterAction magazine article, John Rhys-Davies' part took more than three weeks to record, causing him to refer to the game as the "CD-ROM from Hell". Quest for Glory IV was the first video game in which Jennifer Hale voiced dialogue. The dub of a trio of local farmers is conspicuous for its emphasis on quips and banter, and its indifference to what actually reads on their text boxes.

The end of Quest for Glory III referred to the game as Quest for Glory IV: Shadows of Darkness. The original manuals for the game referred to the game simply as Quest for Glory: Shadows of Darkness. It was later called Quest for Glory IV: Shadows of Darkness in the Quest for Glory Anthology collection manual. Quest for Glory II referred to it as Quest For Glory III: Shadows of Darkness.

== Release ==
Initially, the game was released in December 1993 on nine 3.5" floppy diskettes (as were many other Sierra adventures at the time) to accommodate gamers who didn't have a CD-ROM drive. Pressure to adorn shelves before the holiday season marred the first release with bugs that frustrated the earliest players. Other factors were that the game was ambitious in scope and complex in design compared to other adventures, and Sierra's adventure game technology, the SCI engine, had been undergoing significant revisions during development. Sierra later shipped a version 1.1a patch that was completed on January 10, 1994, free of charge, to customers who requested it. This game was among the first few published games shipped with known software bugs that the publisher planned to later rectify by providing a patch. Fortunately, the main release soon followed. Appearing in September 1994, this finalized CD version brought full recorded dialogue, a new intro cinematic, and fixed gameplay. The jewel box came with a game CD, manual, store catalogue, and legalities. The floppy version came with a smaller and less detailed manual.

As the floppy version had no device-entrusted copyright protection, the player was asked to make several verifications at the beginning of each game. In the CD version, player progression is blocked until you brew a Rehydration Solution. The required preparation instructions and specific puzzle codes are in game's physical manual.

== Reception ==
Computer Gaming World said in March 1994, "Offering a unique mix of dark mystery and light humor, Shadows of Darkness is another award winning adventure". The magazine's Scorpia in April 1994 was less positive. She liked the game's automatic combat option for "those like myself who despise arcade action in adventure games" but disliked the "weak to obscure" puzzles and described the end boss as "a letdown". Scorpia especially criticized its bugs, describing the game as perhaps "the sloppiest product ever released by Sierra" and requiring multiple patches and "numerous replays". She reported that the game's premature release for "'financial reasons'" had hurt Sierra's "reputation for releasing solid products", and hoped that "this is a one-time event and that Sierra is not going to join the ranks of other companies—too numerous to mention—who release shoddy product knowing they can get by with patches and upgrades, and who make 'pay-testers' of their customers", but concluded that "Shadows of Darkness was a disappointment".

James V. Trunzo reviewed Quest for Glory: Shadows of Darkness in White Wolf #43 (May, 1994), giving it a final evaluation of "Very Good" and stated that "If you like your games bloody and macabre, this one won't satisfy your unusual (sick?) tastes. If you simply want some challenging fun presented in a gothic setting, try the newest Quest for Glory."

Rowan Kaizer of Engadget and Ryan Stevens of GameTrailers consider it the best entry of the entire series. Michael Baker for RPGamer considers the installment a good game "worth money even twenty years on", scoring it 4 out of 5 stars. Adam Rosenberg of G4TV considers Shadows of Darkness "the most elaborate and well-designed" entry in the series. PC Gamer's Richard Cobbett considers the game "absolutely wonderful". In 2011, Adventure Gamers named Shadows of Darkness the 23rd-best adventure game ever released.
