= Mixed-Up Fairy Tales =

1991 video game

- Developer(s): Sierra On-Line
- Publisher(s): Sierra On-Line
- Director(s): Lori Ann Cole; Bill Davis (creative)
- Producer(s): Stuart Moulder
- Artist(s): Douglas Herring
- Composer(s): Mark Seibert
- Platform(s): MS-DOS
- Release: 1991
- Genre(s): Adventure, Educational
- Mode(s): Single-player

Mixed-Up Fairy Tales is a graphic adventure game released by Sierra On-Line in 1991. It is a follow-up to Mixed-Up Mother Goose and was made for younger players than those of Sierra's King's Quest or Space Quest series. In it, the player controls a child - selected from one of six and named at will by the player. Commercial copies of the game provided a fairy tale themed coloring book with a set of crayons.

== Plot ==
The player is transported to the land of make believe by the magical dragon Bookwyrm, who needs their help unknotting the mess that has become of five famous fairy tales (Cinderella, Beauty and the Beast, Bremen Town Musicians, Jack and the Beanstalk, and Snow White) thanks to the machinations of a spiteful troll named Bookend. For instance, the prince cannot find Cinderella because her glass slipper was stolen, Jack's axe is missing so he cannot chop down the beanstalk, Snow White is lost and needs help finding the seven dwarves' house, etc. Bookwyrm, who had the book all the stories were recorded in, may be consulted by the player for advice at any time.

== Gameplay ==
The game has a simplified interface different from other Sierra games of the period; instead of several different icons to move the character, look at objects, places and people, operate scenery fixtures, or talk to other characters, Mixed-Up Fairy Tales has only a general icon to interact with the environment, move the player's character and initiate conversation with other characters, and another to look at the player's surroundings. The player cannot "die", and it is impossible to reach a point where onward play is not possible because of lacking an important item or piece of information. The game saving feature was simplified as well, with each game saved automatically when the player quit and merely labeled by their character's name.

Although it allowed children to interact with the characters of their favorite fairy tales, most of the stories' major events would happen off-screen, with the player's movement limited to a four-by-four screen area.

== Reception ==
Reception

Review score
Publication	Score
PC Zone	8/10

Cynthia E. Field of PC Games called Mixed Up Fairy Tales an engaging, nonviolent, challenging game that appeals to both genders.
