= King's Quest VI =

1992 video game

King's Quest VI: Heir Today, Gone Tomorrow
- Developer: Sierra On-Line
- Publisher: Sierra On-Line
- Directors: Jane Jensen; Bil Skirvin; Roberta Williams
- Designers: Jane Jensen; Roberta Williams
- Programmer: Robert W. Lindsley
- Artists: Bil Skirvin; John Shroades
- Writer: Jane Jensen
- Composer: Chris Braymen
- Series: King's Quest
- Engine: Sierra Creative Interpreter
- Platforms: MS-DOS, Windows, Macintosh, Amiga
- Release: October 13, 1992: MS-DOS, Macintosh October 13, 1992; Windows, Amiga 1993
- Genre: Adventure game
- Mode: Single-player

King's Quest VI: Heir Today, Gone Tomorrow is an adventure game developed by Sierra On-Line. It was published originally for MS-DOS and Macintosh in 1992, with an enhanced CD-ROM version and ports to Windows and Amiga computers released in 1993. The sixth entry in the King's Quest series, the game follows Prince Alexander of Daventry as he journeys through the pseudo-medieval fairy tale-inspired realm of the Green Isles, on a quest to defeat the machinations of vizier Abdul Alhazred and rescue Princess Cassima. It is presented as an interconnected set of locations, or flip-screens, with a pseudo-3D art style. The player interacts with locations and items using an icon-based point-and-click interface, and must avoid numerous hazards and obstacles in their quest.

King's Quest VI was developed by Sierra using a version of the same game engine that was used for King's Quest IV (1988) and King's Quest V (1990), the Sierra Creative Interpreter. It was the first game in the series not to have Sierra co-founder Roberta Williams as the sole designer, with Jane Jensen serving as co-designer. It was designed as a blend of common fairy tales and fantasy tropes. The gameplay itself was designed to be less linear than previous games in the series, with multiple endings and a large amount of optional content. The CD version of the game includes additional voice acting, a 3D-animated introduction to the game developed by Kronos Digital Entertainment, and a vocal ballad, "Girl in the Tower", which Sierra suggested that players request be played by radio stations.

The game sold 400,000 copies in its first week, and led the series to 2.5 million sales overall. Critics praised the advances in graphics and animation over prior games and the more difficult optional content; opinions were mixed on the gameplay, as some reviewers found the puzzles based on finding and using objects to be tedious, and its story, which was seen as both touching and lackluster. King's Quest VI has been regarded as the best game of the series, and has been named to several lists of the best adventure games. It has been included in several compilation releases. The King's Quest series, which includes a further two games by Sierra, has been termed its flagship series.

== Gameplay ==
Prince Alexander in a bookstore, with the icon interface at the top

King's Quest VI is a single-player adventure game set in the pseudo-medieval fairy tale-inspired realm of the Green Isles, in which the player controls the character Prince Alexander to defeat the machinations of vizier Abdul Alhazred and rescue Princess Cassima. The game world is divided into dozens of locations, or flip-screens, with one location visible at a time. These locations are presented in pseudo-3D as if viewed from the side, with the player moving Alexander around the screen in front of and behind other elements of the location.

In addition to moving Alexander, the player can interact with the objects, obstacles, and creatures within the location. This is done using an icon-based point-and-click interface: the player selects the walk icon and then a location to move Alexander, an eye icon to be given a description of items or locations clicked on, or a hand icon to interact with an object. Many items can be taken and put in the player's inventory; most are used to solve puzzles or unlock new locations. The inventory icon lets the player use items contextually on an element of the screen.

Some locations have other characters which Alexander can talk to with a speaking icon or who may kill him. The conversations are voice acted in both the floppy disk and CD-ROM versions of the game, though the voices are better quality and the introductory cutscene is longer in the CD version. Alexander can also die from numerous hazards in the game, such as drowning or falling; upon death, the player can reload the game from the last time they saved it. At the conclusion of the game, the player is given a score based on items collected and actions taken.

== Plot ==
A few months after the conclusion to King's Quest V (1990), in which he and his family were rescued from an evil wizard by his father, Prince Alexander is consumed by thoughts of Princess Cassima of the Land of the Green Isles, who was rescued alongside him. He does not know where the Green Isles are, but after seeing a vision of her and the night sky there in the Magic Mirror in his castle's throne room, he sets off to visit her. He is shipwrecked by a storm, however, and washes up on a beach on the Isle of the Crown, home to Cassima and her family, who rule over the Green Isles. When he attempts to see her, the royal family's vizier, Abdul Alhazred, reveals that Cassima is currently in mourning as her parents died in her absence and cannot be visited. After Alexander leaves the castle to explore the isles, Abdul sends his genie, Shamir Shamazel, to kill him and spread lies that Alexander is a foreign assassin to the other islands in the kingdom.

Exploring the Isle of the Crown, Alexander meets court jester Jollo, who admires Cassima and fears Abdul has dark plans for her. After acquiring a magic map, Alexander begins exploring the other islands, discovering that each of their inhabitants believe the other isles responsible for stealing a precious treasure of theirs. Alexander locates these treasures, and on the Isle of the Sacred Mountain, after securing a meeting with its oracle, he learns that Adbul plans to marry Cassima against her will, and that her parents' deaths were not natural. He is advised to seek out the druids on the Isle of the Mists to learn how to enter the Underworld to speak with them. Visiting the druids, he narrowly avoids being burned alive by them through a magic spell he created. With their help, he locates and charms a flying black horse to take him to the Underworld.

In the Underworld, Alexander meets the spirits of Cassima's parents, who reveal that Abdul murdered them. Vowing to bring them back to life, Alexander ventures into the Underworld to meet its ruler, Death, and successfully challenges him for their resurrection. Cassima's parents leave to seek allies to confront Abdul, while Alexander fakes a suicide with Shamir as witness so that Abdul will commence the wedding. Alexander sneaks into the castle, meeting Cassima, and finds evidence of Abdul's murder of her parents. He disrupts the wedding ceremony, and the arrival of Cassima's parents forces Abdul to flee. Alexander frees Shamir by presenting him with his lamp, stolen by Jollo, and Alexander and Cassima defeat Abdul. The pair kiss, and later marry in front of their families and people of the Green Isles. An alternate ending takes place if Alexander sneaks into the castle prior to visiting the druids; he still defeats Abdul, but as her parents are still dead is married to Cassima in a private ceremony not attended by others. The dialogue of the two endings has multiple variations depending on optional puzzles solved during the game.

== Development and release ==
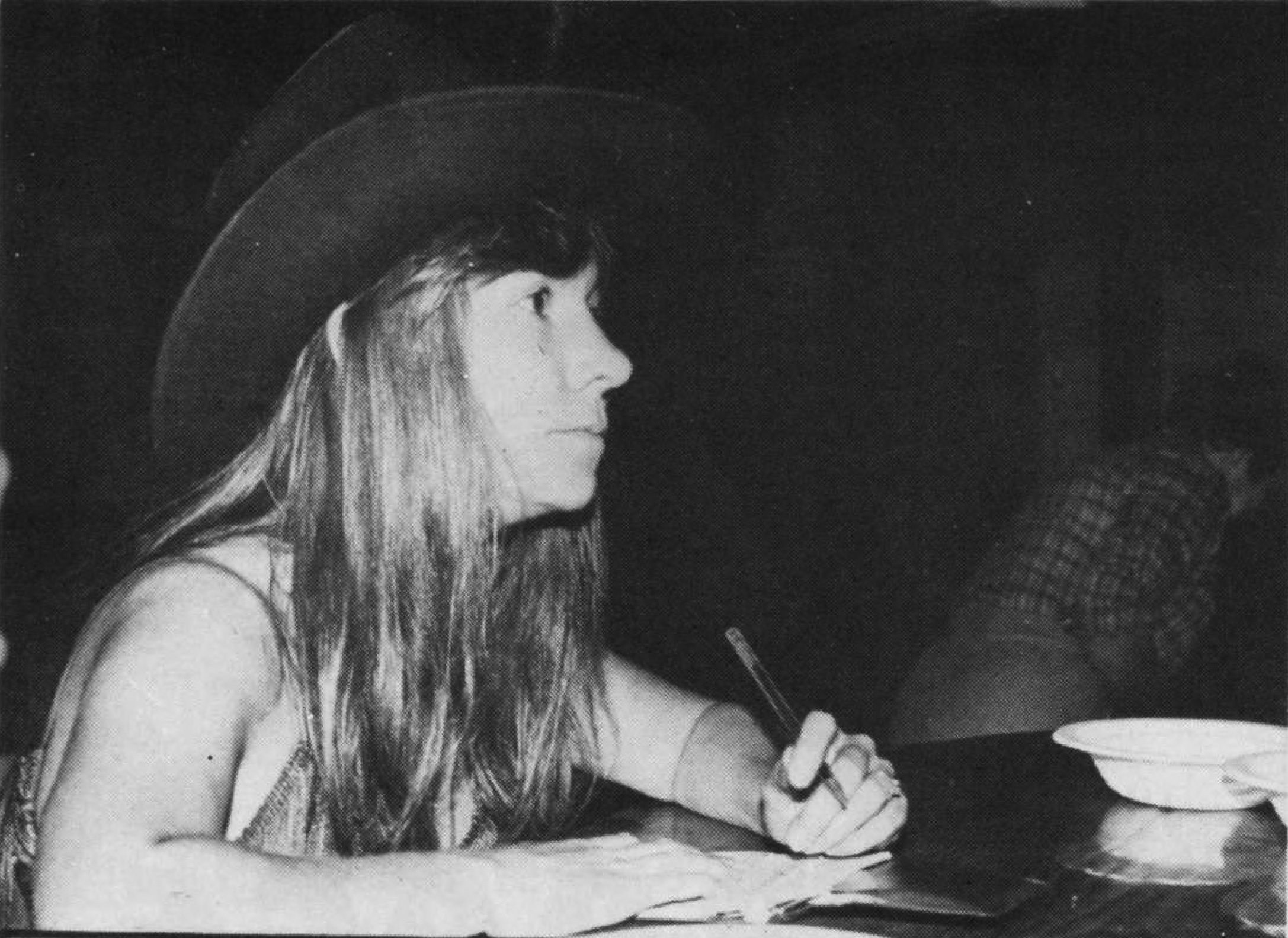
Roberta Williams in 1981

Sierra On-Line was founded in 1979 by Roberta and Ken Williams as On-Line Systems, and in 1984 released King's Quest, later termed King's Quest I, with Roberta Williams as designer alongside a team of six programmers and artists. She made the game world as a blend of common fairy tales that could be directly experienced as a game. It was followed by four sequels between 1985 and 1990, and after their release Sierra began working on a sixth title in the series.

King's Quest VI was the first game in the series not to have Roberta Williams as the sole designer; she was joined by Jane Jensen, who had previously co-designed EcoQuest: The Search for Cetus (1991). Williams had originally intended to be a creative consultant on the game and not design or direct it at all. The pair started designing the game in May 1991, with Williams beginning preliminary work on the story in June, and the design and story were finished after five months. Jensen wrote all of the game's text. Two key goals of the writers were to keep the game's tone consistent with its predecessors' while still making it a distinct title, and to make players connect emotionally with the game; they wrote the love story of Prince Alexander and Cassima specifically for this emotional attachment. Sierra also felt that King's Quest V had been too linear and simple, and had too many long animated sequences. For VI, it wanted to have both a direct route to the end of the game, as well as the option of being more difficult and complicated for players who wanted to explore the whole game. Sierra later promoted the game as having 40% of the content being optional.

Crew filming actors of Alexander and Cassima for the game

Storyboards and character sketches were created by co-director and project manager Bill Skirvin and the artist team. John Shroades was the art director for the 80 painted background scenes. Unlike for King's Quest V, where character animations were created by video taping Sierra employees acting in rudimentary costumes, and then painting each frame of animation over the images, for VI actors were filmed directly and the footage then integrated into the scenes as more than 2,000 animations. Chris Braymen composed the music and produced the sound effects. The 3D-animated introduction to the game was produced by Stanley Liu of Kronos Digital Entertainment, which did special effects for films such as Batman Returns (1992) and The Lawnmower Man (1992).

The first three games in the series had used the same engine for the game to interpret and react to player inputs called the Adventure Game Interpreter (AGI), and for King's Quest IV (1998) Sierra had developed a new adventure game engine, the Sierra Creative Interpreter (SCI), which was enhanced for King's Quest V to use a point-and-click interface rather than a text parser. King's Quest VI used an improved version of SCI again as its engine. Sierra made both a floppy disk version and a CD-ROM version of the game; the CD version features an extended version of the opening sequence, a full voiceover of every line of text in the game, and a revised soundtrack including a vocal ballad, "Girl in the Tower". The song was composed by Mark Seibert with lyrics by Jensen and vocals by Debbie Seibert and Bob Bergthold, and serves as the game's love theme, played during the end credits.

Sierra sent a CD with "Girl in the Tower" to various radio stations and bundled with the game a pamphlet listing these stations and suggesting that fans call them and ask for the song to be played. It was played by some, but also resulted in Sierra receiving legal threats from stations bothered by excessive requests from listeners. Ken Williams later jokingly said that the stations "were the criminals for ignoring their customers — something I believe no business should ever do". Director Stu Rosen directed the voice cast of King's Quest VI for the CD version, which includes actor Robby Benson as Prince Alexander. Five additional people to the game's team were involved in the development of the CD version.

=== Release ===
Sierra first announced the game at the Consumer Electronics Show in June 1992, with a planned release that year. Development finished in September, when Sierra's marketing and distribution departments began promoting and releasing the game. In an interview with The New York Times, Williams estimated the budget to have been about US$700,000 (equivalent to $1,606,000 in 2025) and that the development team had included more than 20 people working for 14 months. King's Quest VI was initially scheduled for release in September 1992, then delayed until mid-October. Sierra began shipping the game on October 6 with a release date of October 13 on floppy disks for MS-DOS and Macintosh. The CD version of the game was released in mid-1993 for MS-DOS and Windows.

An Amiga port was developed by Revolution Software; Sierra had produced Amiga versions of prior King's Quest games, but announced in early 1993 that it would no longer support the platform. The port began development in March 1993 and was released for the Amiga in December. It uses Revolution's Virtual Theatre engine instead of SCI due to better performance on the platform.

== Reception ==
Reception

Review scores
Publication	Score
Amiga Power	70%
Computer Game Review	91%
Dragon	5/5
Tilt	80%
VideoGames & Computer Entertainment	9/10
Amiga World	A-
CU Amiga	89%
Dator Magazin	3/5
PC Player	61%

King's Quest VI was the best-selling computer game of October 1992 through February 1993, according to PC Research, falling out of the top ten after March; the Macintosh version was the second best-selling game for the system in May 1993; and the CD version was in the top ten best-selling CD games from September 1993 through February 1994 and the third-highest of all of 1993. According to Ken Williams, about 400,000 copies were sold in its first week of release. PC Data later reported that King's Quest V's sales in the United States alone reached between 300,000 and 400,000 units. Upon the 1994 release of King's Quest VII, Sierra said that the series had reached 2.5 million sales overall, which it claimed was the most of any computer game series.

Opinions on the gameplay were mixed. Chuck Miller of Computer Gaming World applauded the variety and difficulty of puzzles, as did Moose Brightman of MegaZone, and Barry Brenesal of PC Games called them "intricate and intriguing". The three Lesser reviewers of Dragon found them challenging, and White Wolf's Jim Trunzo said they were the hardest of the King's Quest series. The reviewers for Computer Game Review, Alfred Giovetti of VideoGames & Computer Entertainment, and Göran Fröjdh of Dator Magazin all praised the way the harder puzzles were optional or formed a second route through the game, thus allowing "beginning adventurers" to play as well as more experienced players. Boris Schneider of PC Player, however, heavily criticized the game's reliance on collecting small objects and applying them all in "trial-and-error guesswork", which was seconded by Compute!'s Scott May, Amiga Power's Jonathan Davies, and Amiga World's Peter Olafson. Charles Ardai, in a review of the CD version for Computer Gaming World, further said that the puzzles were presented to the player by characters in "the most heavy-handed way imaginable". The more positive reviews were complimentary of the game's place among adventure games; Russ Ceccola of Electronic Games said it was the best King's Quest game and Computer Gaming World's initial review said it was the best game Sierra had yet made, while Dragon and VideoGames & Computer Entertainment said it was one of the best adventure games available.

The graphics were widely praised, especially the animation; White Wolf called the graphics "breathtaking", and MegaZone and Amiga Power praised the artwork of the locations. Computer Gaming World said that the high quality of the graphics was expected from Sierra at this point, but the animations were an advancement, Compute! said that the use of small animations throughout the scenes "greatly enriches the story's ambiance", and Electronic Games said that they set the game apart from contemporaries. Marc Menie of Tilt, in a review of the Macintosh version, however, said that the animations slowed the game down on that system. The introductory cutscene to the game was particularly noted as impressive by Dragon and Dator, while the CD version review by Computer Gaming World called it "incomparable" visually.

The plot and writing of the game received a mixed response, with PC Games praising both, while Amiga World said that the writing had grown from that of prior games in the series into something "poignant". The Computer Gaming World CD review, however, dismissed it as "paper-thing storytelling", and Amiga Power said it was dreary and cliched, though not bad, and filled with characters without personality. The music was generally praised, though Steve Keen of CU Amiga said it lacked life and Tilt called it "decent". Other reviewer opinions ranged from White Wolf and VideoGames & Computer Entertainment, which called it beautiful and impressive, to Amiga World, which said that "never has a Siera score sounded this majestic". Compute! and Computer Gaming World said that the voice acting in the disk version of the game was clear but "stilted", while Computer Gaming World said that the voices in the CD version were better than the prior game's, though over-acted.

== Legacy ==
According to Sierra On-Line, combined sales of the King's Quest series surpassed 3.8 million units by the end of March 1996. Computer Game Review named the game as the second-best adventure game of 1992, behind Indiana Jones and the Fate of Atlantis. PC Gamer US named it the 48th best computer game ever in 1994. In 2006, GameSpot named it as one of the best video games of all time. GamesRadar placed it as the 5th best point-and-click adventure game in 2012, and Kotaku included it in its list of the 10 adventure games "everyone must play" in 2015. Video game historians Matt Barton and Bill Loguidice, in Vintage Games: An Insider Look at the History of Grand Theft Auto, Super Mario, and the Most Influential Games of All Time (2012), claimed that King's Quest VI was "usually regarded as the finest game in the series", a claim repeated by GamesRadar in 2012 and Rock Paper Shotgun in 2020.

The King's Quest series, which has been described as Sierra's "flagship series", includes a further two games by Sierra, King's Quest VII in 1994 and King's Quest: Mask of Eternity in 1998. King's Quest VI has been released in several collections of games in the series in the 1990s and 2000s. It is also included in the modern King's Quest Collection on Steam and the King's Quest 4+5+6 collection released on GOG. In 1988, Silicon Valley Books published The King's Quest Companion, a combination hint guide and novelization by Peter Spear of the games in the series. Updated editions were released through 1997 as further games were released in the series. An unofficial remake of the game was released in 2024 as King's Quest VI AGI Demake, remaking the game for the AGI game engine, including its text parser for entering text commands rather than a point-and-click interface.

== Sources ==
- Barton, Matt; Loguidice, Bill (2012). Vintage Games: An Insider Look at the History of Grand Theft Auto, Super Mario, and the Most Influential Games of All Time. CRC Press. ISBN 978-1-136-13758-7.
- Kalata, Kurt, ed. (2011). The Guide to Classic Graphic Adventures. Hardcore Gaming 101. ISBN 978-1-4609-5579-6.
- Mills, Shawn (2020). The Sierra Adventure: The Story of Sierra On-Line. ISBN 978-1-71675-872-0.
- Shannon, Lorelei (1992). King's Quest VI: Heir Today, Gone Tomorrow Hint Book (PDF). Sierra On-Line.
- Spear, Peter (1993). The King's Quest Companion (3rd ed.). Osborne/McGraw-Hill. ISBN 978-0-07-881815-8.
- Trivette, Donald B. (1988). The Official Book of King's Quest: Daventry and Beyond (PDF) (1st ed.). Compute! Books. ISBN 0-87455-155-2.
- Trivette, Donald B. (1991). The Official Book of King's Quest: Daventry and Beyond (PDF) (2nd ed.). Compute! Books. ISBN 0-87455-245-1.
- Trivette, Donald B. (1993). The Official Book of King's Quest: Daventry and Beyond (PDF) (3rd ed.). Compute! Books. ISBN 0-87455-274-5.
