= Quest for Glory =

Video game series

- Quest for Glory Anthology cover art
- Genres: Adventure/role-playing (I–IV) and action/RPG (V)
- Developer: Sierra On-Line
- Publisher: Sierra On-Line
- Creators: Corey Cole, Lori Ann Cole
- Platforms: MS-DOS, Amiga, Atari ST, Classic Mac OS, NEC PC-9801, Windows
- First release: Quest for Glory: So You Want to Be a Hero; March 1989
- Latest release: Quest for Glory V: Dragon Fire; 1998

Quest for Glory is a series of hybrid adventure/role-playing video games, which were designed by Corey and Lori Ann Cole. The series was created in the Sierra Creative Interpreter, a toolset developed at Sierra specifically to assist with adventure game development. The series combines humor, puzzle elements, themes and characters borrowed from various legends, puns, and memorable characters, creating a 5-part series in the Sierra stable.

The series was originally titled Hero's Quest. However, Sierra failed to trademark the name. The Milton Bradley Company successfully trademarked an electronic version of their unrelated joint Games Workshop board game, HeroQuest, which forced Sierra to change the series' title to Quest for Glory. This decision meant that all future games in the series (as well as newer releases of Hero's Quest I) used the new name.

== Series ==
Lori Cole pitched Quest for Glory to Sierra as a "rich, narrative-driven, role-playing experience".

The series consisted of five games, each of which followed directly upon the events of the last. New games frequently referred to previous entries in the series, often in the form of cameos by recurring characters. The objective of the series is to transform the player character from an average adventurer to a hero by completing non-linear quests.

The game also was revolutionary in its character import system. This allowed players to import their individual character, including the skills and wealth they had acquired, from one game to the next.

Hybrids by their gameplay and themes, the games feature serious stories leavened with humor throughout. There are real dangers to face, and true heroic feats to perform, but silly details and overtones creep in (when the drama of adventuring does not force them out). Cheap word play is particularly frequent, to the point that the second game's ending refers to itself as the hero's "latest set of adventures and miserable puns."

The games have recurring story elements. For example, most installments in the series require the player to create a dispel potion.

The games include a number of Easter eggs, including a number of allusions to other Sierra games. For example, if a player types "pick nose" in the first game, (or clicks the lockpick icon on the player in the new version), if their lock-picking skill is high enough, the game responds: "Success! You now have an open nose". If the skill is too low, the player could insert the lock pick too far, killing himself. Another example is Dr. Cranium, an allusion to The Castle of Dr. Brain, in the fourth game.

Each game draws its inspiration from a different culture and mythology: (in order, Germanic/fairy tale; Middle Eastern/Arabian Nights; Egyptian/African; Slavic folklore; and finally Greco-Mediterranean) with the hero facing increasingly powerful opponents with help from characters who become more familiar from game to game.

Each game varies somewhat from the tradition it is derived from; for example, Baba Yaga, a character borrowed from Slavic folklore, appears in the first game which is based on German mythology. The second game, which uses Middle Eastern folklore, introduces several Arab and African-themed characters who reappear in the third game based on African folklore and Egyptian mythology, and also features some elements inspired by American culture, including references to the film Casablanca. Characters from every game and genre in the series reappear in the fourth and fifth games. In addition to deviating from the player's expectations of the culture represented in each game, the series also includes a number of intentional anachronisms, such as the pizza-loving mad scientists in the later games.

Many CRPG enthusiasts consider the Quest for Glory series to be among the best in the genre, and the series is lauded for its non-linearity. The games are notable for blending the mechanics of adventure video games and roleplaying video games, their unique tone which combines pathos and humour, and the game systems which were ahead of their time, such as day-night cycles, non-playable characters which adhered to their own schedules within the games, and character improvement through both skill practice and point investiture. The website Polygon and the Kotaku blog have characterised the game as a precursor to modern day RPGs. Fraser Brown of the Destructoid blog considers the games: "one of the greatest adventure series of all time".

Rowan Kaizer of the blog Engadget credits the games' hybrid adventure and roleplaying systems for the series' success. "The binary succeed/fail form of adventure game puzzles tended to either make those games too easy or too hard," he wrote, "But most puzzles in Quest For Glory involved some kind of skill check for your hero. This meant that you could succeed at most challenges by practicing or exploring, instead of getting stuck on bizarre item-combination puzzles".

== Gameplay ==
The first four games are hybrid adventure/role playing video games with real-time combat, while the fifth game switches to the action RPG genre.

The gameplay standards established in earlier Sierra adventure games are enhanced by the player's ability to choose the character's career path from among the three traditional role-playing game backgrounds: fighter, magic-user/wizard and thief. Further variation is added by the ability to customize the Hero's abilities, including the option of selecting skills normally reserved for another character class, leading to unique combinations often referred to as "hybrid characters". During the second or third games, a character can be initiated as a Paladin by performing honorable actions, changing his class and abilities, and receiving a unique sword. This applies when the character is exported into later games. Any character that finishes any game in the series (except Dragon Fire, the last in the series) can be exported to a more recent game (Shadows of Darkness has a glitch which allows one to import characters from the same game), keeping the character's statistics and parts of its inventory. If the character received the paladin sword, he would keep the magic sword (Soulforge or Piotyr's sword) and special paladin magic abilities (with the exception of Shadows of Darkness, where the character loses all of his belongings, including the weapons, before the game begins). A character imported into a later game in the series from any other game can be assigned any character class, including Paladin.

Each career path has its own strengths and weaknesses, and scenarios unique to the class because of the skills associated with it. Each class also has its own distinct way to solve various in-game puzzles, which encourage replay: some puzzles have up to four different solutions. For instance, if a door is closed, instead of lockpicking or casting an open spell, the fighter can simply knock down the door. The magic user and the thief are both non-confrontational characters, as they lack the close range ability of the fighter, but are better able to attack from a distance, using daggers or spells. An example of these separate paths can be seen early in the first game. A gold ring belonging to the healer rests in a nest on top of a tree; fighters might make it fall by hurling rocks, thieves may want to climb the tree, while a magic user can simply cast the fetch spell to retrieve the nest, and then, while the fighter and magic user return the ring for a reward, the thief can choose between returning or selling the same ring in the thieves' guild (which is not available for those not possessing the "thieving" skills). It is also possible to build, over the course of several games, a character that has points in every skill in the game, and can therefore perform nearly every task. However, certain tasks are presented only to characters of a specific class.

Each character class features special abilities unique to that class, as well as a shared set of attributes which can be developed by performing tasks and completing quests. In general, for a particular game the maximum value which can be reached for an ability is 100*[the number of that game]. Quest for Glory V allows stat bonuses which can push an attribute over the maximum and lets certain classes raise certain attributes beyond the normal limits. Quest for Glory V also features special kinds of equipment which lower some stats while raising others. At the beginning of each game, the player may assign points to certain attributes, and certain classes only have specific attributes enabled, although skills can be added for an extra cost.

General attributes influence all characters' classes and how they interact with objects and other people in the game; high values in strength allows movement of heavier objects and communication helps with bargaining goods with sellers. These attributes are changed by performing actions related to the skill; climbing a tree eventually increases the skill value in climb, running increases vitality, and so on. There are also complementing skills which are tied to specific classes; parry (the ability to block a blow with the sword), for instance, is mainly used by fighters and paladins, lock picking and sneaking are defaults with the thief, and the ability to cast magic spells is usually associated with magic user.

Vital statistics are depleted by performing some actions. Health, (determined by strength and vitality), determines the hit points of the character, which decreases when the character is attacked or harms himself. Stamina (based on agility and vitality) limits the number of actions (exercise, fighting, running, etc.) the character is able to perform before needing rest or risking injury. Mana is only required by characters with skill in magic, and is calculated according to the character's intelligence and magic attributes.

Puzzle and Experience points only show the development of the player and his progress in the game, though in the first game also affects the kind of random encounters a player faces, as some monsters only appear after a certain level of experience is reached.

== Games ==
Aggregate review scores As of 10 August 2014.
Game	GameRankings
Quest for Glory	(PC) 76.33%
Quest for Glory II	(PC) 78.33%
Quest for Glory III	(PC) 63.75%
Quest for Glory IV	(PC) 73.75%
Quest for Glory V	(PC) 72.57%

=== Quest for Glory: So You Want to Be a Hero ===
In the valley barony of Spielburg, the evil ogress Baba Yaga has cursed the land and the baron who tried to drive her off. His children have disappeared, while the land is ravaged by monsters and brigands. The Valley of Spielburg is in need of a Hero able to solve these problems.

The original game was released in 1989 while a VGA remake was released in 1992.

=== Quest for Glory II: Trial by Fire ===
Quest for Glory II: Trial by Fire takes place in the land of Shapeir, in the world of Gloriana. Directly following from the events of the first game, the newly proclaimed Hero of Spielburg travels by flying carpet with his friends Abdulla Doo, Shameen and Shema to the desert city of Shapeir. The city is threatened by magical elementals, while the Emir Arus al-Din of Shapeir's sister city Raseir is missing and his city fallen under tyranny.

Quest for Glory II is the only game in the series not to have originated or have been remade beyond the EGA graphics engine by Sierra, but AGD Interactive released a VGA fan remake of the game using the Adventure Game Studio engine on August 24th, 2008.

=== Quest for Glory III: Wages of War ===
Rakeesh the Paladin brings the Hero (and Prince of Shapeir) along with Uhura and her son Simba to his homeland, the town of Tarna in a jungle and savannah country called Fricana that resembles central African ecosystems.

Tarna is on the brink of war; the Simbani, the tribe of Uhura, are ready to do battle with the Leopardmen. Each tribe has stolen a sacred relic from the other, and both refuse to return it until the other side does. The Hero must prevent the war then thwart a demon who may be loosed upon the world.

=== Quest for Glory: Shadows of Darkness ===
Drawn without warning from his victory in Fricana, the Hero arrives without equipment or explanation in the middle of the hazardous Dark One Caves in the distant land of Mordavia. While struggling to survive in this land plagued with undead, the Hero must prevent a dark power from summoning eternal darkness into the world.

=== Quest for Glory V: Dragon Fire ===
Erasmus introduces the player character, the Hero, to the Greece-like kingdom of Silmaria, whose king was recently assassinated. Thus, the traditional Rites of Rulership are due to commence, and the victor will be crowned king. The Hero enters the contest with the assistance of Erasmus, Rakeesh, and many old friends from previous entries in the series. The Hero competes against competitors, including the Silmarian guard Kokeeno Pookameeso, the warlord Magnum Opus, the hulking Gort, and the warrior Elsa Von Spielburg.

== Collections ==
- Quest for Glory Anthology (1996), a package that includes the first four games, including the fully patched CD version of QFG IV; game copy protection codes (a feature of Quest for Glory IV) are included in the manual and on CD, while game saves are included in the save folder of the CD and the VGA version of Quest for Glory I.
- Quest for Glory Collection Series (1997), a re-release of Anthology with a Dragon Fire demo and sample soundtrack.
- Quest for Glory 1–5 (2012), a digital collection on GOG.com and Steam that includes all five games in the series (including the EGA version and VGA remake of QFG1).

== Original concept ==
Originally, the series was to be a tetralogy, consisting of four games, with the following themes and cycles: the four cardinal directions, the four classical elements, the four seasons and four different mythologies.

This is what the creators originally had in mind:

Game	Cardinal Direction	Central Element	Season	Central Mythology
Quest for Glory: So You Want to Be a Hero	North	Earth	Spring	Germanic
Quest for Glory II: Trial by Fire	South	Fire	Summer	Middle Eastern
Quest for Glory: Shadows of Darkness	East	Air	Fall	Slavic
Quest for Glory V: Dragon Fire	West	Water	Winter	Greek

However, when Shadows of Darkness was designed, it was thought that it would be too difficult for the hero to go straight from Shapeir to Mordavia and defeat the Dark One. To solve the problem, a new game, Wages of War, was inserted into the canon, resulting in a renumbering of the series. Evidence for this can be found in the end of Trial by Fire: the player is told that the next game will be Shadows of Darkness and a fanged vampiric moon is shown, to hint at the next game's theme.

The developers discussed this in the Fall 1992 issue of Sierra's InterAction magazine, and an online chat room:

"When we developed the concept for the series," explained Corey, "we wanted some unifying themes for the story. We worked with the four seasons, the four basic elements – Earth, Air, Fire, and Water – and the four cardinal points of the compass. We planned to create four games to follow these elements.

"The first game – So You Want to be a Hero – is springtime and Earth and set in medieval Germany in the North. The second game – Trial by Fire – was the element of Fire, in the summer, and set in the South, in Arabia."

"The original third chapter," added Lori, "was to be Shadows of Darkness, set in Transylvania – the East – and in the Fall, using Air as the central element."

Somewhere between finishing Trial by Fire and cranking up the design process for Shadows of Darkness, the husband-and-wife team realized a fifth chapter would have to be added to bridge the games. That chapter became Wages of War.

The concept of seasons in the games represents the maturation of the Hero as he moves from story to story. It's a critical component in a series that – from the very beginning – was designed to be a defined quartet of stories, representing an overall saga with a distinct beginning, middle, and end.

"One of the unifying themes," explained Corey, "is the growth of your character, going from being an adolescent Hero in the first game to being a young man in the second. You're strong and confident..." "The third game," continued Lori, "was to show you as a master of your profession, with the fourth depicting you at the mature peak of your powers."

In the first episode, the player is a new graduate of the Famous Adventurer's Correspondence School, ready to venture out into the springtime of his career and build a reputation.

In the second chapter – Trial by Fire – the Hero enters the summer of his experience, facing more difficult challenges with more highly developed skills. While the episode is more serious and dangerous than its predecessor, it retains the enchanting mixture of fantasy, challenge, and humor that made the first game a hit with so many fans.

Of all the reasons Lori and Corey found for creating a bridge between Trial by Fire and Shadows of Darkness, the most compelling was the feeling that the Hero character simply hadn't matured enough to face the very grim challenges awaiting him in Transylvania.

"In terms of role-playing aspects," said Corey, "Shadows of Darkness is going to be a very difficult game. You'll have very tough opposition from the very beginning of the game."

"Also," said Lori, "you'll be very much alone. In Trial by Fire you had a lot of friends to help you. You always had a place to go back to rest. You always had a place of safety until the very end of the game. Once you get into Shadows of Darkness, you're not going to have any sanctuary. You won't be able to trust anyone, because nobody will trust you.

"Wages of War is the bridge," she continues. "You start with people you know to help you along in the beginning. But when push comes to shove, you're the one who's on his own, who has to solve the ultimate mystery. As you go along, just when you think you're all alone, your allies come back to you, but you have to face the final challenge by yourself."

— Lori and Corey Cole

== Characters ==
Along with the Hero, several recurring characters appear and re-appear throughout the series including: Rakeesh Sah Tarna, Baba Yaga, Abdullah Doo, Elsa von Spielburg, the evil Ad Avis, and others.

== World ==
The fictional world in which the Quest for Glory series takes place includes the town of Spielburg (based on German folklore and Norse mythology), the desert city of Shapeir (based on the Arabia of One Thousand and One Nights), the jungle city of Tarna (based on African mythology, especially Egypt), the hamlet of Mordavia (based on Slavic mythology) and Silmaria (based on Greek mythology). Adventures, monsters and story of the games are usually drawn from legends of the respective mythology on which a title is based, although there are several cross-over exceptions, like the Eastern European Baba Yaga also appearing in the first game, which is distinctly German/Nordic.

== See also ==
- Hero-U: Rogue to Redemption
- Heroine's Quest
