= Hero-U: Rogue to Redemption =

2018 video game

- Developer: Transolar Games, Inc.
- Publishers: Transolar Games, Inc.
- Directors: Lori Ann Cole; Corey Cole
- Designers: Lori Ann Cole; Corey Cole
- Writers: Lori Ann Cole; Corey Cole; Josh Mandel
- Composer: Ryan Grogan
- Engine: Unity
- Platforms: Linux, Microsoft Windows, OS X, Nintendo Switch
- Release: July 10, 2018
- Genre: Adventure Role-playing
- Mode: Single-player

Hero-U: Rogue to Redemption is a 2018 adventure role-playing game by the creators of Quest for Glory, Lori Cole and Corey Cole, developed with a custom Unity engine. It is based on the School for Heroes, the defunct e-mail based web game the Coles had created previously. It was released for Windows, Mac, and Linux on July 10, 2018.

== Gameplay ==
The player character is Shawn, a rogue who is attending a school for heroes. He interacts and competes with his fellow students during the day, and can travel down into the catacombs at night to go on quests and solve puzzles. The player can learn new skills and explore new areas as the game unfolds. Dialog choices matter, as what is chosen to say will affect the relationship Shawn makes with the people he meets. Combat is turn-based and tactical. If Shawn chooses to sneak around combat situations, the combat is also avoidable.

== Development ==
In 2012, The Coles financed Hero U: Rogue to Redemption through a successful Kickstarter crowdfunding campaign. They are developing the game under their company, Transolar Games, Inc.

After a number of development challenges documented in Kickstarter project updates, Transolar Games rebooted development in January 2015 by adding several experienced Unity developers to the team. The Coles extended the game financing with a second successful Kickstarter campaign.

According to details from the Kickstarter updates, the total project budget as of April 2018 exceeded $1 million, consisting of $500,000 from the two Kickstarter campaigns along with personal savings, loans, and outside investment. Hero-U: Rogue to Redemption entered Alpha Testing in August 2017, with a commercial release on July 10, 2018.

== Reception ==
Hero-U garnered generally positive reviews, and holds an average of 80/100 on aggregate web site Metacritic.
