= Hoyle Majestic Chess =

2003 video game

- Developer: Fluent Entertainment
- Publishers: NA: Sierra Entertainment; EU: JoWooD Productions
- Series: Hoyle
- Platform: Windows
- Release: NA: September 8, 2003; EU: February 25, 2005
- Genre: Computer chess
- Modes: Single-player, multiplayer

Hoyle Majestic Chess (Released in Europe as Majestic Chess) is a 2003 chess video game developed by Fluent Entertainment for the Windows. It is part of the Hoyle series in North America. An Xbox version was announced in April 2003 alongside the Windows version but it was canceled.

== Gameplay ==
The game features three view modes: 2D, fixed perspective faux 3D, and fully 3D. There are eight different chess piece sets per board style. The playing strength of the AI is represented by 32 "personalities". Custom personalities can be added by a creation module. Online multiplayer is included. The tutorial is depicted as a narrative fantasy game. The player travels across a map and completes chess lessons that are portrayed as quests. The mode was compared to the Heroes of Might and Magic series.

== Reception ==
Reception

Aggregate score
Aggregator	Score
GameRankings	78%

Review scores
Publication	Score
Computer Gaming World	3.5/5
GameSpot	7.5/10
GameSpy	4/5
GameZone	8.6/10
IGN	8.5/10
PC Gamer (US)	79%
PC Games (DE)	78%

Hoyle Majestic Chess received generally positive reviews from critics. GameSpot recommended Fritz 8 or Chessmaster 9000 for experienced players but said the fantasy tutorial is the best way to introduce a person to chess. IGN said the real draw of the game is the adventure mode and called the chess engine "robust". GameZone concluded: "From the detailed graphics, amazing music, excellent tutorial, and excellent concept, everyone should find something to enjoy with this game." Computer Gaming World summarized: "While it ultimately fails to be an easily accessible, helpful tool to teach the true novice how to play chess well, Majestic Chess is a well-made product that provides good competition for amateur players who aren't too serious about their game." PC Gamer called the game "An admirable chess experience, with enough lessons to keep you occupied for ages." The Washington Post said that "This chess game's varying styles of play, traditional and inventive learning mechanisms and robust Internet play provide enough of a challenge to make you work on your game -- and enough fun to make that effort worthwhile."
