= Quest for Glory: So You Want to Be a Hero =

1989 video game

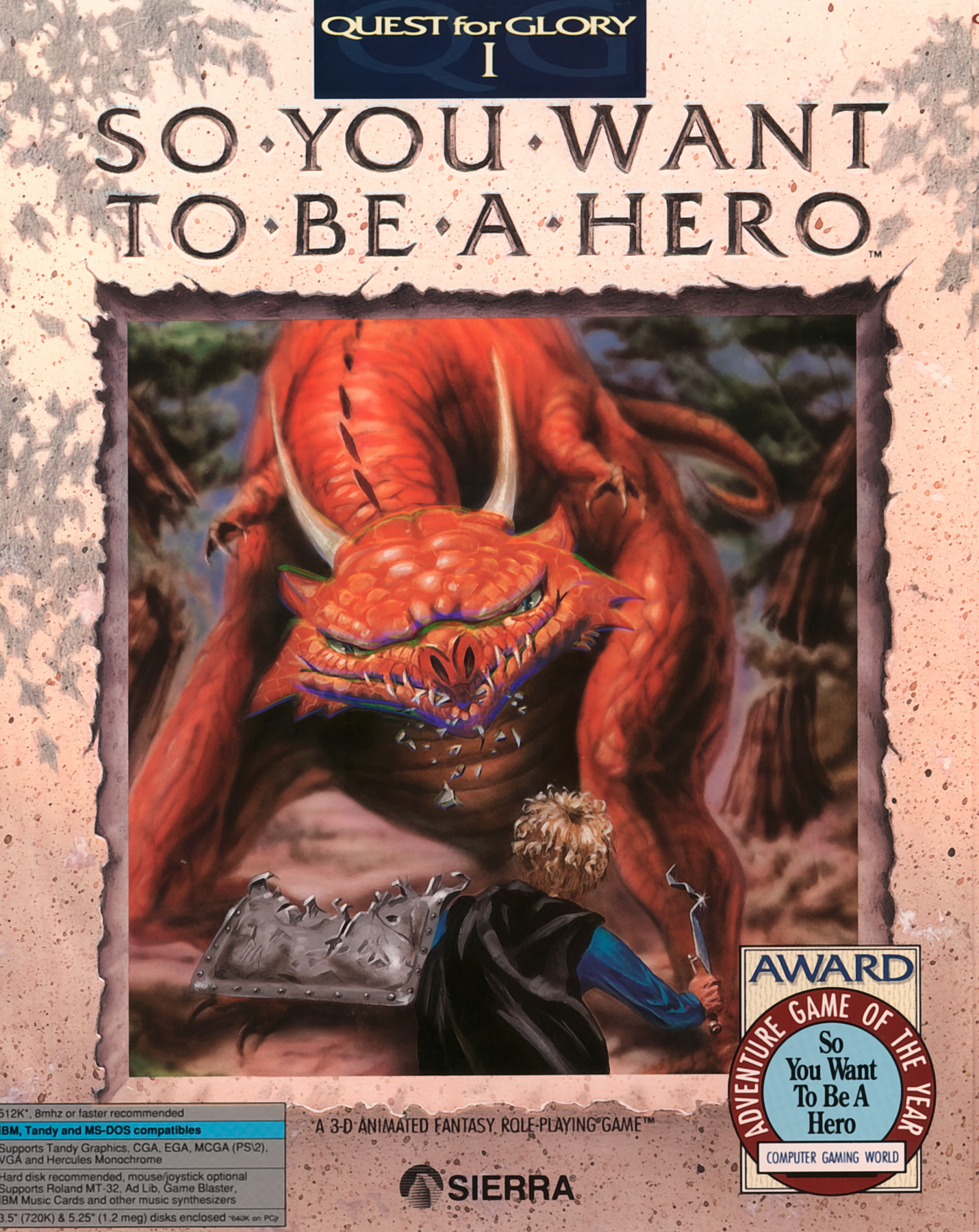
- Cover art of the retitled version
- Developer: Sierra On-Line
- Publisher: Sierra On-Line
- Directors: Corey Cole and Lori Ann Cole
- Composer: Mark Seibert
- Series: Quest for Glory
- Platforms: MS-DOS, Amiga, Atari ST, PC-98, Mac OS
- Release: October 1989 (EGA); July 1992 (VGA, floppy); April 1994 (VGA, CD)
- Genres: Adventure, role-playing
- Mode: Single-player

Quest for Glory: So You Want to Be a Hero (originally released as Hero's Quest: So You Want to Be a Hero) is a 1989 adventure game/role-playing game hybrid, designed by Corey Cole and Lori Ann Cole and published by Sierra On-Line for MS-DOS. It is the first game in the Quest for Glory series, and established the series' trademark mix of graphical adventure gaming with role-playing-like elements such as statistic building (strength, intelligence, health) that would affect the ability to accomplish certain tasks in the game. The game has a satirical and silly tone. Ports for the Amiga, Atari ST, and NEC PC-9801 were released in the early 1990s. A VGA remake with enhanced graphics, titled Quest for Glory I: So You Want to Be a Hero, was released in 1992 for MS-DOS, and later in 1994 for Mac OS.

== Gameplay ==
The original release was an adventure game with a text parser, with players typing commands for the character to perform. The remake is a point-and-click adventure game.

The game advertised itself as "three games in one" since it was the first Sierra game that (according to RPG customs) allowed the selection of a character out of three classes: Fighter, Magic User, and Thief. What class the hero assigns to a character largely determines with what equipment the character begins, how they can solve puzzles and what quests they will run into. However, the distinction between classes was not an absolute one; players could add skills to a character and allow them to complete quests related to other classes in this game and others in the series.

In Quest for Glory, the passage of time is tracked; the situation can be different between day and night, and the scenery adjusted to match. The main character had to eat on a regular basis, and would become tired from running and fighting which required rest and sleep. Skills did not increase by gaining levels through combat, but rather through the regular course of adventuring. The more the player used magic, the more the Hero's Magic ability would increase (followed by Intelligence); likewise the more the player engaged in battle, training, or even cleaning the baron's stables, the more the Hero's Strength, Vitality and Agility would increase.

This is one of the few Sierra adventure games where the player character has few or no speaking lines. Although the player can input commands such as "ask about brigands", the player character has almost no dialogue.

== Plot ==
In the valley barony of Spielburg, the evil ogress Baba Yaga has cursed the land and the baron who tried to drive her off. His daughter has disappeared and his son has been transformed into a bear, while the land is ravaged by monsters and brigands. The Valley of Spielburg is in need of a Hero able to solve these problems. The player's character is a customized adventurer whose name and class is chosen by the player. The game follows the Hero, who is a recent graduate of the Famous Adventurer's Correspondence School, on his journey into the land. He must help people and become a proclaimed Hero.

The adventurer battles brigands and monsters such as kobolds, solves side quests (such as finding lost items and spell ingredients) and helps fantasy creatures such as a dryad, a hermit, and a colourful collection of furry creatures called Meeps. Fulfilling quests will grant him experience and money, which he may use to buy equipment and potions. The game is open-ended, which means the player can explore all of the game at once and solve the quests in any order. During the quest, the character also meets recurring series characters such as the wizard Erasmus and his familiar Fenrus, and first hears tales of the benevolent faery Erana.

While the game can be completed without solving the secondary quests, in the optimal ending, which nets the player the maximum score and serves as canon for the remainder of the series, the player frees the baronet from a powerful curse and thwarts the plans of the witch Baba Yaga. Finally, the adventurer frees the baron's daughter, Elsa von Spielburg, from the curse which had transformed her into the brigand leader. By doing so, the adventurer fulfills a prophecy, restores Spielburg Valley to prosperity, and is awarded the title of Hero. After this, the Hero, along with the merchant Abdulla Doo and the innkeepers Shameen and Shema, leaves on a magic carpet for Shapeir, the homeland of the three, setting the plan for the sequel, Quest for Glory II: Trial by Fire.

== Development ==
The idea for Quest for Glory was that the game should "be as much about story as it was about combat and exploration". The story and setting are culled from various folklore sources.

Many planned features were cut off in the development progress, to release the game in a realistic amount of time. Originally, Lori had planned for four different races: thief-like gnome, magic-wielding elf, human as a jack of all trades, and archer centaur, as well as the option for a female player character. Due to the limited resources available, the development team scaled back these plans, compromising with multiple classes for the human character. In the original design, there was supposed to be a big goblin maze. References to this have remained in the goblin base of the original version. Many of the town buildings were planned to be enterable. Also, magic users were supposed to be able to get a familiar like Zara had, but it was cut due to programming difficulties.

The game was originally released as Hero's Quest: So You Want to Be a Hero but was re-released in 1990 as Quest for Glory I: So You Want to Be a Hero because of trademark issues involving the HeroQuest board game.

The original game sported EGA graphics, while the remake had VGA graphics.

According to Corey Cole, the game's co-creator, the original Quest for Glory game cost $150,000 to make, while the VGA remake cost almost as much to make as a full VGA entry.

== Reception ==
So You Want to Be a Hero is credited as a genre-defining video game, due to its mix of adventure and roleplaying elements.

Scorpia of Computer Gaming World stated in 1990 that the game's puzzles were easy, but still fun for an experienced player, and that excellent graphics and good use of humor and role-playing elements made the game "a definite winner". In 1990 the magazine named it as Adventure Game of the Year, describing it as one of the few introductory games that both beginners and veterans of adventures enjoyed. In 1993 Scorpia approved of the "cute hybrid's" graphics, humor, and replayability. In 1996, the magazine named Quest for Glory the 73rd best game ever, and 15th on the magazine's list of the most innovative computer games.

Jim Trunzo reviewed Hero's Quest in White Wolf #19 (Feb./March, 1990), rating it a 4 out of 5 and stated that "Hero's Quest I serves as a training ground and learning experience for the sequels. However, that's a bonus because Hero's Quest is an excellent play in its own right."

Jim Trunzo reviewed Quest for Glory I: So You Want to Be a Hero in White Wolf #33 (Sept./Oct., 1992), rating it a 4 out of 5 and stated that "The humor, action, and puzzles of the original game made it an immediate and enduring favorite among gamers. The newest version should help it reclaim a top spot once again." Compute! in 1993 said that Hero's Quest was "probably the most satisfying" Sierra game and that Quest for Glory was "in many ways a significant improvement", citing the Coles' rewriting of the original's text. The magazine praised its clay animation and stereo soundtrack, and recommended the game even to those who finished Hero's Quest, concluding that it was "a must-buy ... hard to resist".

The editors of Macworld gave Quest for Glory their 1994 "Best Role-Playing Game" award. Writing about their decision, the magazine's Steven Levy remarked that the game "merges classic role-playing aspects—building up a character's attributes by vanquishing enemies, all in service of a larger goal—with the more playful mood and interactivity of Sierra On-Line's King's Quest adventure-game series." He called it "a kinder, gentler form of role-playing game, and one particularly well suited to newcomers to the genre, especially those familiar with adventure gaming."

Michael Baker of RPGamer scored the game 3.5 out of 5, writing that it is "a piece of RPGaming history that stands the test of time" that balances puzzles, gameplay, and writing to entertaining effect, while finding the game's pacing to be sometimes too slow. Tyler Willis of RPGamer gave the game 4 out of 5 stars, praising especially the personality and presentation of its in-game locations and characters. Richard Cobbett for PC Gamer stated that his impressions of the game are "almost all" positive, especially for the VGA remake, due to the great adventure offered and the spectacular game world.

The game sold 130,000 copies in its first year of release. According to Corey Cole, the game became one of Sierra's fastest-selling products, selling over 250,000 copies in its first few years.

== Remake ==
Combat in the 1992 remake

Like the first games in the King's Quest, Space Quest, Police Quest, and Leisure Suit Larry series, a VGA version using Sierra's point and click SCI1.1 interpreter was released in 1992 for MS-DOS and Classic Mac OS. This version had input limitations compared to the original, which used the text-parser–based SCI0. The VGA remake and original version were also released on CD-ROM as part of the 1996 Anthology collection and 1997 Collection Series.

While the original game was based on dialogues and asking questions in order to obtain some background information, in the new interface the dialogues had a tree structure: a menu of question topics. By asking certain questions (e.g., "Ask about Potion"), the player will get new questions to ask (e.g., "Healing potion", "Stamina potion", "Dispel potion"). The backgrounds and characters were hand drawn and scanned, while the monster fights and character portraits were made using clay models and stop motion animation. Unlike other games, running out of stamina points here can kill the hero outright instead of starting to do health damage. Some easter eggs were also updated; for example, in Erasmus's house, the original has a reference to King's Quest IV, while the remake has a reference to The Dagger of Amon Ra. The treasure room in the troll cave leading to the Brigand's hideout was missing in the remake.

According to Corey Cole, Lori Cole was responsible for the design of both the VGA remake and Quest for Glory III: Wages of War, which she worked on at the same time. The box art for the remake is reminiscent of the famous painting of Saint George and the Dragon.

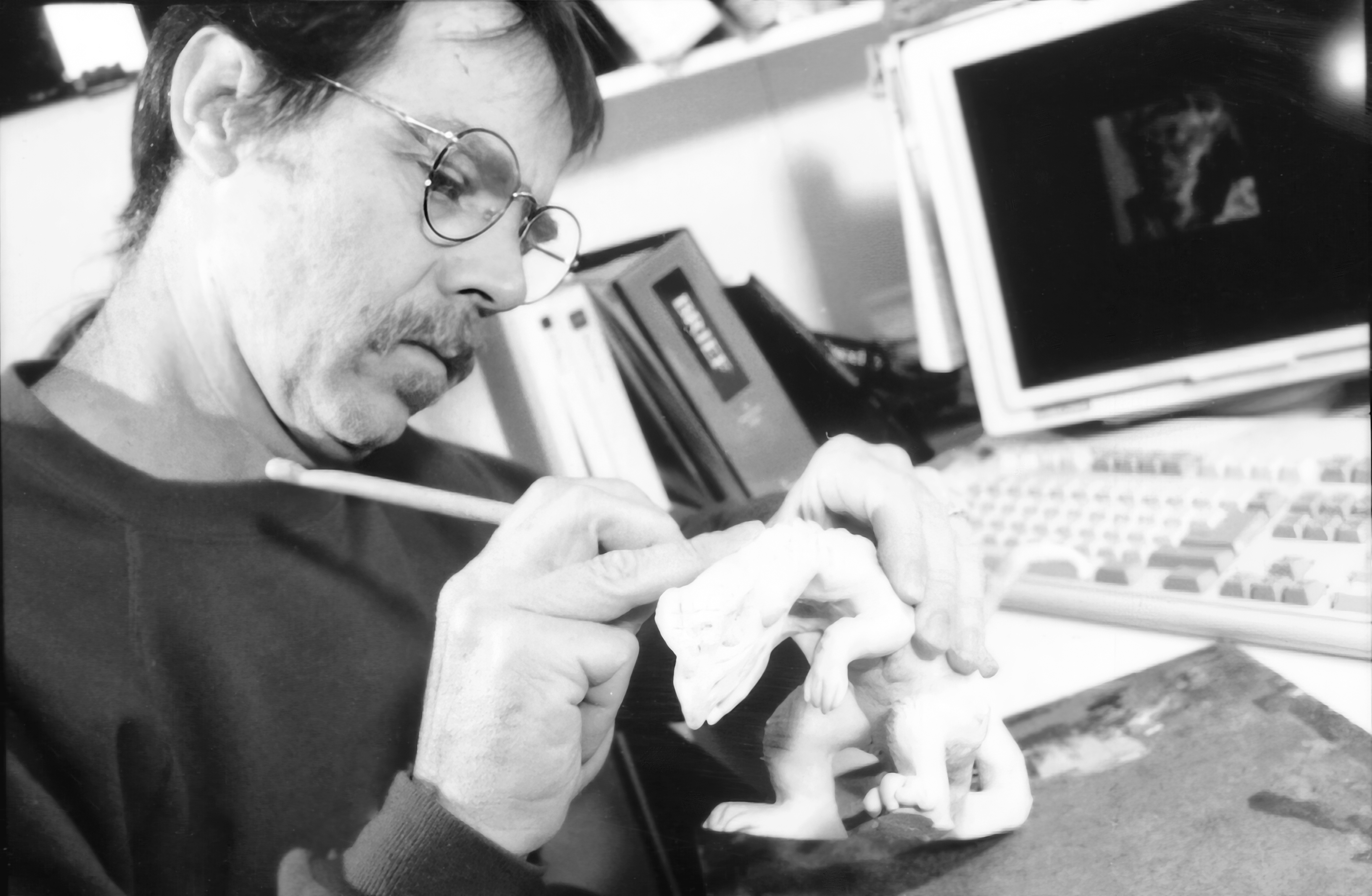
Saurus stop motion clay model

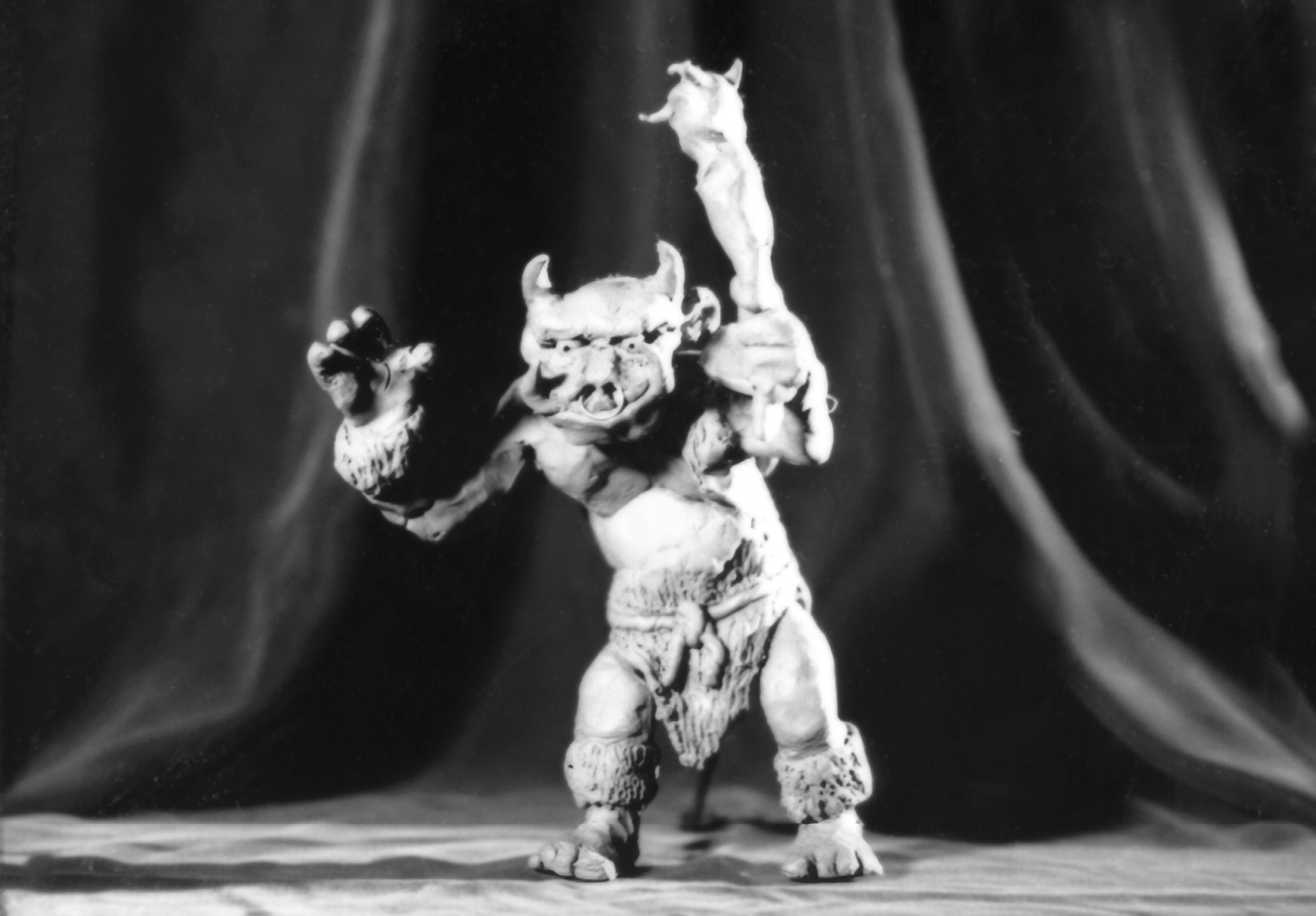
Ogre clay model

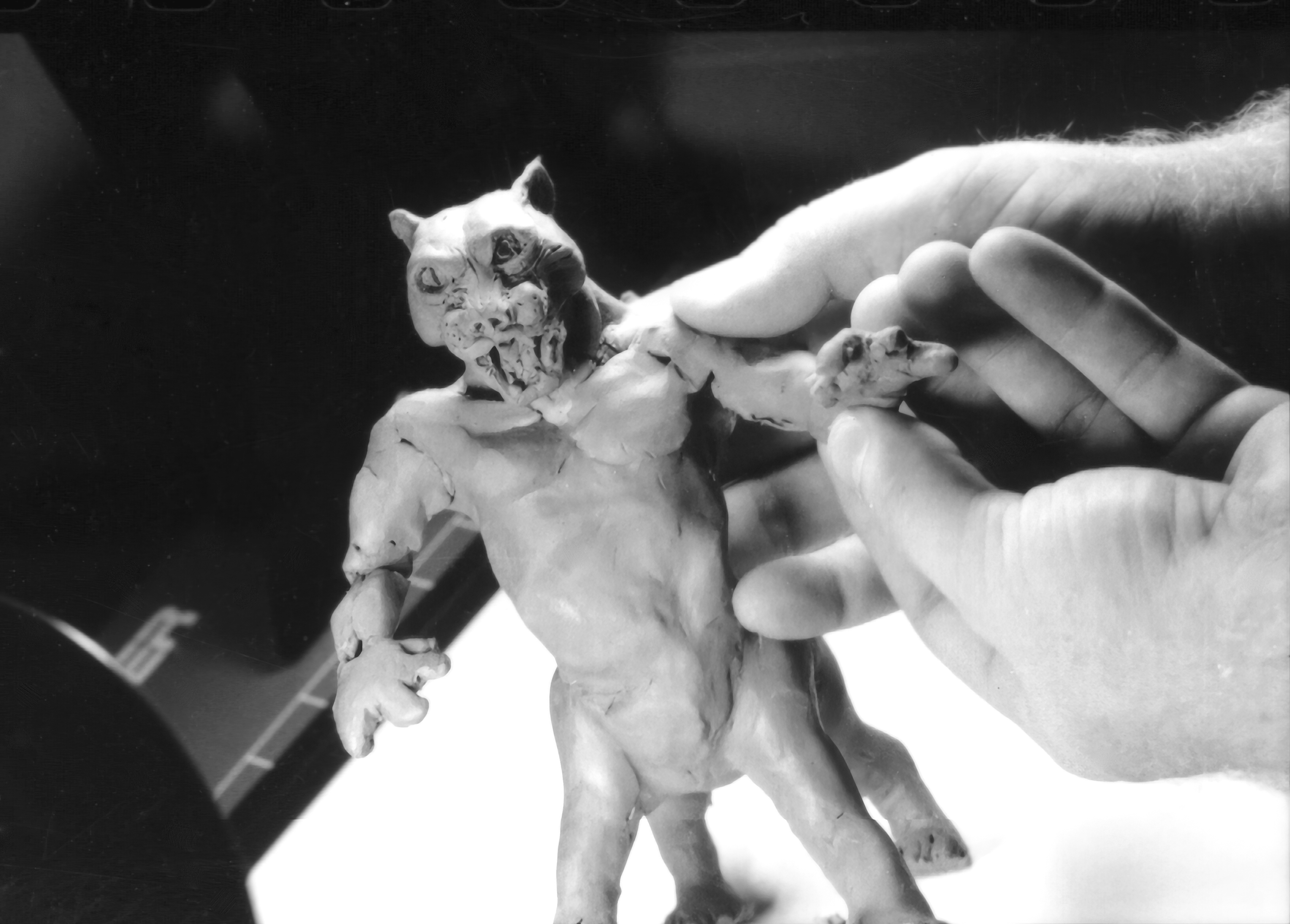
Cheetaur clay model
