= Quest for Glory II: Trial by Fire =

1990 video game

- Developer(s): Sierra On-Line
- Publisher(s): Sierra On-Line
- Director(s): Bill Davis (creative)
- Producer(s): Guruka Singh-Khalsa
- Designer(s): Lori Ann Cole; Corey Cole
- Programmer(s): Robert Fischbach
- Artist(s): Kenn Nishiuye
- Composer(s): Christopher Braymen; Mark Seibert
- Series: Quest for Glory
- Platform(s): MS-DOS, Amiga
- Release: 1990
- Genre(s): Adventure/role-playing
- Mode(s): Single-player

Quest for Glory II: Trial by Fire is the second video game in Sierra On-Line's Quest for Glory series, and the sequel to Hero's Quest: So You Want to Be a Hero.

== Gameplay ==
The game's interface is a text parser, which requires the player to input commands from a set (but unknown) list to have the character perform actions.

The game follows the path of its predecessor, although there are distinctions in gameplay. Most of the game takes place in the fictional city, and on a restricted time frame; the entire plot is concluded in 30 days. Many of the puzzles in the game do not appear or cannot be solved until certain days. This keeps gameplay on a tight, linear narrative. The game is also difficult to navigate, as it has an odd perspective and mapping system. The problems with the navigation are compounded by the maze-like layout of the fictional city. This layout was employed as a primitive form of digital rights management: completing early quests was very difficult without the map in the manual provided with purchases of the video game. This difficulty is reduced once the player obtains a magical map which transports their character instantly to hotspots.

The player has the opportunity to advance their character, explore side-quests, and have the character take up a career appropriate to its class and skill. For example, a magic-user can earn the title of "Wizard" with the sponsorship of the wizard Erasmus, if he can overcome a series of magical challenges and graduate from the Wizards' Institute of Technocery. A fighter may earn a membership in the Eternal Order of Fighters. A thief may perform several thefts, including the running gag of stealing the Maltese Falcon. However, the player is not locked out of different side quests depending on class. If the character is a fighter with some magical ability (e.g. a magic user imported from Quest for Glory I playing as a fighter) this cross-training can be utilised to complete other quests. It is possible for the character to become a Wizard, complete every theft in the game, and join the Eternal Order of Fighters.

The game contains plenty of pop culture references, such as the Cookie Monster, and easter eggs, such as being able to don X-ray glasses at a particular time in order to see a character nude.

This is also the first game of the series where the hero may be awarded the title of Paladin. To achieve this status, the hero must act honorably throughout the game and Rakeesh, the liontaur (lion-centaur) will present to you his Paladin sword, Soulforge. Since the title of the Paladin is given at the end of the game, the Paladin abilities and Soulforge are only usable with characters that are imported into Quest for Glory III: Wages of War and later games.

The game features a real-time combat system.

== Plot ==
The story is inspired by various Middle Eastern myths and stories, including Arabian Nights.

Quest for Glory II takes place in the city of Shapeir and its surrounds, a land which is host also to Katta, humanoid, cat-like creatures. Directly following from the events of the first game, the newly proclaimed Hero of Spielburg travels by flying carpet with his friends Abdulla Doo, Shameen and Shema to the desert city of Shapeir. The city is threatened by magical elementals of fire, earth, wind, and water, while the Emir Arus al-Din of Shapeir's sister city Raseir is missing and his city fallen under tyranny.

After defeating the four elementals that threaten Shapeir, the Hero travels to the city of Raseir, which is missing its emir. There, he is imprisoned by Khaveen and under hypnosis helps the evil tyrannical wizard Ad Avis to resurrect the evil genie Iblis. In the final fight, the Hero attacks the palace and battles with Ad Avis, who falls to his presumed death begging for assistance from his Dark Master. As thanks for the Hero's success in liberating Raseir and restoring its lost splendor, the Sultan of Shapeir, Harun al-Rashid, rewards the Hero by adopting him as his son.

== Development ==
According to Corey Cole, a developer and producer for the game, Quest for Glory II cost $450,000. Trial by Fire was the last EGA game to be created by Sierra On-Line, and followed development processes intended for the graphically superior VGA games which followed, which made its development difficult.

The manual is illustrated by Marvel Comics artist Ernie Chan.

=== Characters and references ===
Quest for Glory II is the only game in the series without any influence of Erana in it. It does, however, feature a reference to Erana, as she is in one of the portraits of great mages in the Wizards' Institute of Technocery. If the Hero requests her sponsorship in his initiation as a wizard, he is told that Erana had not been answering the WIT's summons for many years now.

There are various Easter eggs throughout the game, such as the Starship Enterprise from the television series Star Trek appearing during the opening credits. The astrologer appears to have been based on Omar Khayyám.

As in the other games of the series, there are a large number of in-jokes and mythological references, especially, from 'The Arabian Nights. One of them is the name of the Sultan, Harun al-Rashid.

The game contains many references to classic films. The caravan scene is an homage to Lawrence of Arabia. Signor Ferrari and Ugarte, characters portrayed by Sydney Greenstreet and Peter Lorre in the movie Casablanca, appear in Raseir, as does the Maltese Falcon from the movie of the same name, which also featured Greenstreet and Lorre in other roles. Caricatures of the Marx Brothers also play important roles.

There are several references to other games or movies in magician Keapon Laffin's shop: a doll of princess Rosella (from the King's Quest series), a Cookie Monster doll, and an antwerp doll (a reference to the first game), among other things.

The final city in this game is Raseir, an anagram for Sierra, the company that produced the game, and the antagonist, Ad Avis, is named after Sierra's then-new creative director, Bill Davis. Both names were chosen by the designers as parodies, as subtle references to a changing atmosphere within Sierra: Raseir is an Orwellian city, Ad Avis its totalitarian dictator.

== Reception ==
Although the game is generally well liked, its time management aspect had a mixed reception, with some critics feeling it arbitrary.

UK magazine ACE gave the Amiga version a score of only 600 out of 1000, praising its size, but criticizing it for its average graphics, grating music, slowness and for the large amount of disk swapping needed while playing. In 1991, Dragon gave the game 5 out of 5 stars. Computer Gaming World stated that the game was more linear and less replayable than its predecessor, but had an excellent conclusion.

Both Michael Baker and Tyler Willis of RPGamer gave the game 4 out of 5 starts, praising the game's strong narrative, superb writing, and graphical design.

In 2011, Adventure Gamers named Quest for Glory II the 81st-best adventure game ever released.

== Legacy ==
QFG II is the only game in the series to not have originated or have been remade beyond the EGA graphics engine by Sierra On-Line. However, AGD Interactive released a VGA remake of the game using the Adventure Game Studio engine on August 24, 2008.
