= King's Quest V =

1990 video game

King's Quest V: Absence Makes the Heart Go Yonder!
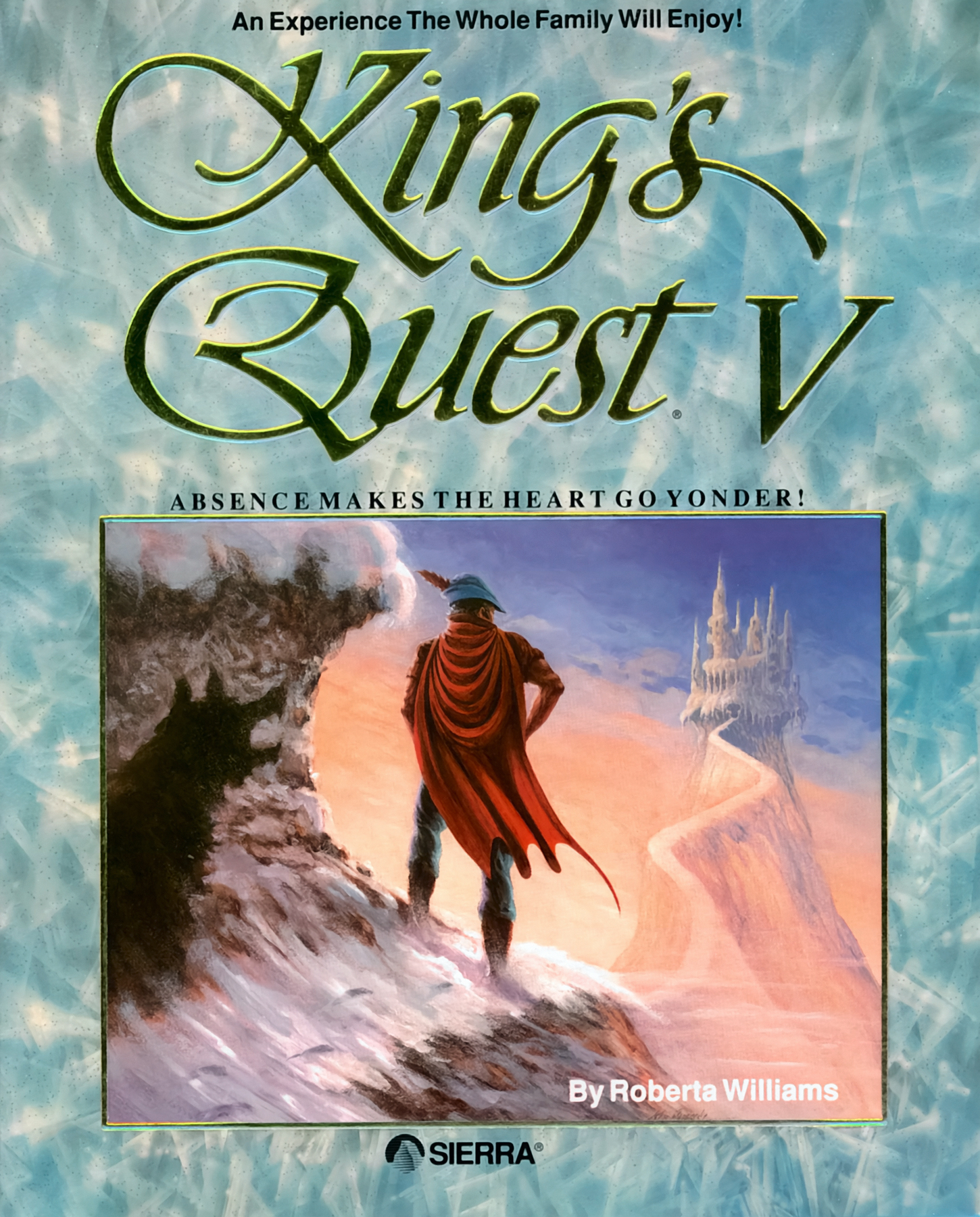
- Developer: Sierra On-Line
- Publisher: Sierra On-Line
- Designer: Roberta Williams
- Programmer: Chris Iden
- Artist: Andy Hoyos
- Writer: Roberta Williams
- Composers: Ken Allen; Mark Seibert
- Series: King's Quest
- Engine: Sierra Creative Interpreter
- Platforms: MS-DOS, Macintosh, Amiga, FM Towns, NEC PC-9801, NES
- Release: November 1990: MS-DOS November 1990; Macintosh, Amiga, FM Towns, NEC PC-9801 1991; NES 1992
- Genre: Adventure
- Mode: Single player

King's Quest V: Absence Makes the Heart Go Yonder! is an adventure game developed by Sierra On-Line. It was published originally for PCs and home computers in 1990 and ported to other computers in 1991 and the Nintendo Entertainment System in 1992. The fifth entry in the King's Quest series, the game follows King Graham of Daventry as he journeys through the pseudo-medieval fairy tale-inspired realm of Serenia, on a quest to rescue his family from the wizard Mordack. It is presented as an interconnected set of locations, or flip-screens, with a pseudo-3D art style. The player interacts with locations and items using an icon-based point-and-click interface, a first for the series, and must avoid numerous hazards and obstacles in their quest.

King's Quest V was developed by Sierra using an expanded version of the game engine that was originally developed for King's Quest IV (1988), the Sierra Creative Interpreter, and was one of the first games to be released on CD-ROM. Other versions of the game were released on floppy disks, sometimes with lower-quality graphics. It was designed by Sierra co-founder Roberta Williams as a blend of common fairy tales and fantasy tropes, and returned Graham as the protagonist for the first time since King's Quest II (1985) due to popular demand. The gameplay itself was designed to be easier than prior games, in order to, along with the new interface, expand the audience into more casual players. Unlike prior games, the artwork was hand-painted rather than composed of computer drawing instructions.

The game sold 300,000 copies by early 1992, and led the series to 1.5 million sales overall. Critics praised the advances in graphics and animation over prior games as well as the new interface. Opinions were mixed on the gameplay, as certain reviewers found specific puzzles obtuse or frustrating, and its story, which was criticized by some as overtly cute and family-oriented. The game won "Best Fantasy Role-Playing/Adventure Program" at the 1991 Software Publishers Association awards, as well as Computer Gaming World's 1991 Adventure Game of the Year. It has been included in several compilation releases. The King's Quest series, which includes a further three games by Sierra, has been termed its flagship series.

== Gameplay ==
MS-DOS VGA screenshot, with Graham facing Cedric beneath the point-and-click interface. The CD version of the game combined some of the icons.

King's Quest V is a single-player adventure game set in the pseudo-medieval fairy tale-inspired realm of Serenia, in which the player controls the character King Graham to rescue his family from the wizard Mordack. The game world is divided into dozens of locations, or flip-screens, with one location visible at a time. These locations are presented in pseudo-3D as if viewed from the side, with the player moving Graham around the screen in front of and behind other elements of the location.

In addition to moving Graham, the player can interact with the objects, obstacles, and creatures within the location. This is done using an icon-based point-and-click interface: the player selects the walk icon and then a location to move Graham, an eye icon to be given a description of items or locations clicked on, or a hand icon to interact with an object. Many items can be taken and put in the player's inventory; most are used to solve puzzles or unlock new locations. The inventory icon lets the player use items contextually on an element of the screen. A few puzzles in the game require the player to act quickly or else be unable to complete the game, though most do not. In the floppy disk versions of the game, a copy protection scheme occasionally asks the player to cast a spell given in the game's manual.

Some locations have other characters which Graham can talk to with a speaking icon or who may kill him. In the CD-ROM version of the game, these conversations are voice acted, while in other versions they are shown through text boxes. Graham can also die from numerous hazards in the game, such as drowning or falling; upon death, the player can reload the game from the last time they saved it. At the conclusion of the game, the player is given a score based on items collected and actions taken; unlike prior games in the series, almost all of the score is based on items and actions required to complete the game, with few optional elements.

== Plot ==
King Graham of Daventry returns from a walk in the forest to find his castle, and family within, have mysteriously disappeared. A talking owl named Cedric flies to him and explains that the evil wizard Mordack used magic to pull the castle out of the ground and send it flying through the sky, though he does not know why. Seeking to help him, Cedric uses fairy dust to fly Graham to his employer, the good wizard Crispin, in the land of Serenia. There, Crispin provides him with his old, weak wand and a piece of whitesnake, which allows its user to speak with animals and the natural world. He also orders Cedric to accompany Graham on his quest and lead him to Mordack.

While exploring Serenia, including a town, a dark forest, and a desert, and helping its inhabitants, Graham meets with a traveling fortune teller, who shows him a vision of his family shrunken and imprisoned within Mordack's castle. From the vision, Graham learns that Mordack is the brother of the wizard Manannan, whom his son Prince Alexander once turned into a cat. (Note: As depicted in King's Quest III) He also hears Mordack explain to Alexander that the spell can only be reversed by the one who cast it, and thus he kidnapped Graham's family in order to force Alexander to undo it. Alexander does not know how to do so, however, even though Mordack threatens to feed his hostages to Manannan.

Graham travels across the mountains and the ocean, dealing with a yeti, harpies, and a large two-headed roc, while rescuing Cedric from dangerous situations. Eventually, the pair reach Mordack's castle, with Graham forced to gain entry on his own. Once inside, Graham encounters Cassima, a young princess from the Land of the Green Isles, whom Mordack is holding prisoner. With her help, Graham gains access to Mordack's laboratory, and uses a device to repower Crispins' wand. After Cedric accidentally saves Graham's life upon Mordack discovering his intrusion, Graham and Mordack have a magical duel, ending with Mordack's death when Graham conjures a rain storm after Mordack transforms into a ring of fire.

Crispin arrives after the duel is over, and uses his magic to restore Graham's family to normal. Graham introduces them to Cassima, and Alexander asks to see her in the future. After Crispin heals Cedric, he sends Cassima home to the Green Isles, and Graham, his family, and his castle back to Daventry.

== Development and release ==
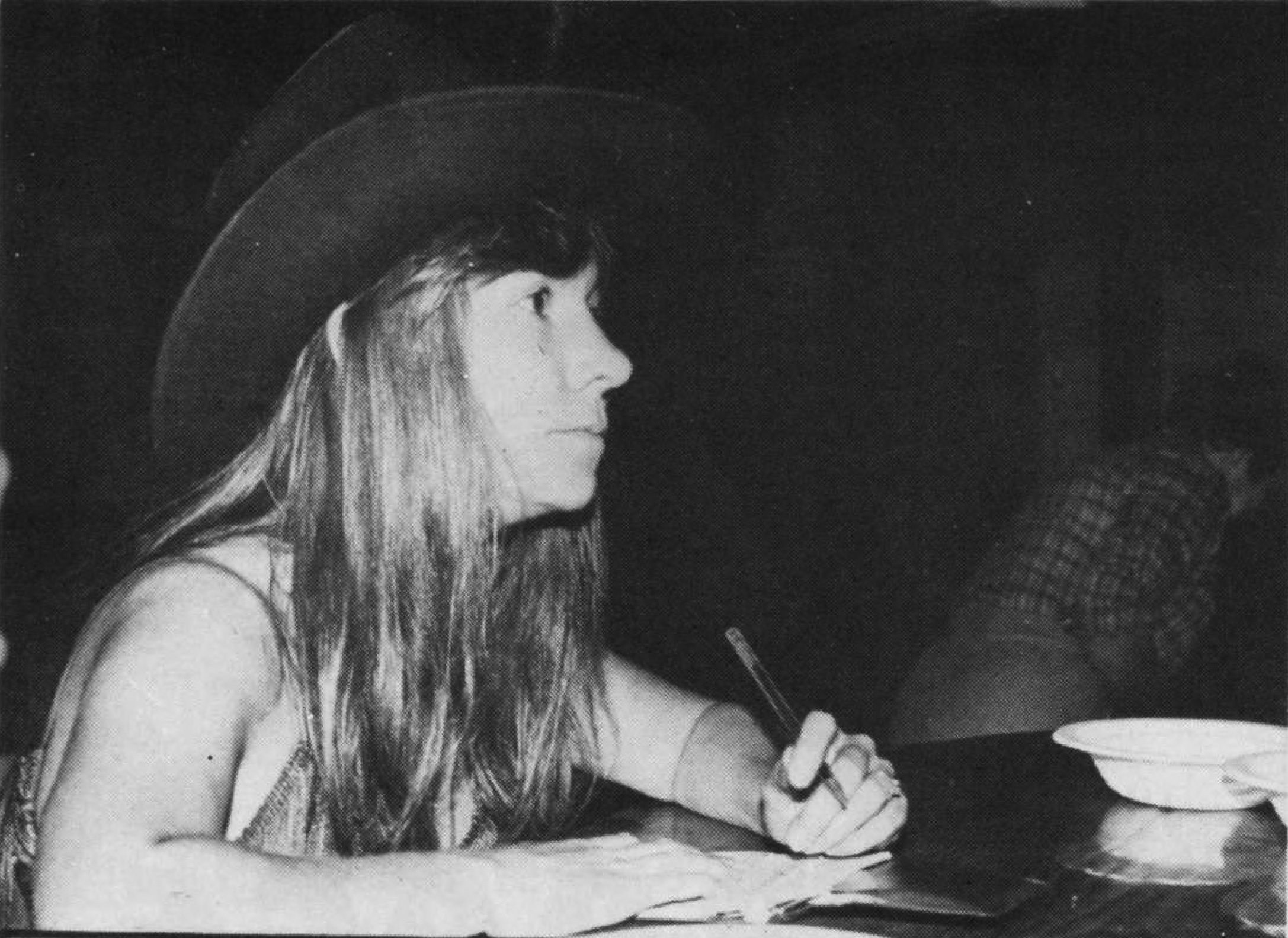
Roberta Williams in 1981

Sierra On-Line was founded in 1979 by Roberta and Ken Williams as On-Line Systems, and in 1984 released King's Quest, later termed King's Quest I, with Roberta Williams as designer alongside a team of six programmers and artists. She made the game world as a blend of common fairy tales that could be directly experienced as a game. It was followed by three sequels between 1985 and 1988, and after their release Sierra began working on a fifth title in the series.

The first three games in the series had used the same engine for the game to interpret and react to player inputs called the Adventure Game Interpreter (AGI), and for King's Quest IV Sierra had developed a new adventure game engine, the Sierra Creative Interpreter (SCI). The new engine allowed for higher quality animation and higher-resolution graphics, and additionally added support for sound cards which could provide more realistic sound effects and music, but like the AGI, all input was text-based. For King's Quest V, the SCI engine was enhanced to replace the text-based parser with an icon-based point-and-click interface. The game was designed by Roberta Williams, and built by a team of around fifty people over ten months, with Bill Davis as the creative director. It was Sierra's first game to have a development budget of over US$1,000,000 (equivalent to $2,464,340 in 2025).

Sierra stated in 2015 that the core elements of a King's Quest game were family-friendly humor, fairy tale themes, cute characters, a clear story, and non-violent solutions to problems. Williams, when designing the game, planned from the start to make King Graham the protagonist again due to player demand, but initially had trouble developing a plot so soon after finishing work on The Colonel's Bequest (1989) two weeks prior. While considering several plot ideas, her son Chris mentioned the idea of the castle being destroyed by an evil wizard, and she took the plot from there. The gameplay itself was designed to be easier than prior games, in order to expand the audience into more casual players. Replacing the text interface with a point-and-click interface was also intended to appeal to a wider audience, as it removed the requirement for players to use the same words that the developers were thinking of and spell them correctly. Williams also found that it meant she could take the time previously spent on writing responses to invalid inputs and spend it on other aspects of the design, and that she had to be more careful in designing puzzles. She did, however, find that having to create the interface and the game in the same limited time period meant that she included fewer alternative solutions to puzzles than she would have liked.

The development process began with Williams drafting the story and puzzles of the game on paper, before the other developers then implemented that design. Unlike prior games in the series, wherein the artwork was saved as a set of drawing instructions rather than images, for King's Quest V, once Roberta approved the final sketch of a given scene, it was painted in acrylics on a board and scanned in. The artists then selected areas and set their priority, or how far in the foreground or background they are. The character animations were made by video taping Sierra employees acting in rudimentary costumes, and then painting each frame of animation over the images, which Sierra marketed as "cinemagraphic". The music of the game was composed over the course of three months by Mark Seibert and Ken Allen, and the voice acting was done by members of the development team. The title is a play on the phrase "absence makes the heart grow fonder".

=== Release ===
Sierra first announced the game at the Consumer Electronics Show in June 1990, with a planned release that year. It initially stated that the game would come out first in 256-color VGA on floppy disks for MS-DOS, to be soon followed by versions for CD-ROM as well as Amiga, Macintosh, and Atari ST computers. King's Quest V—along with a re-release of Mixed-Up Mother Goose (1987)—was to be not only Sierra's first games on CD, but one of the first games ever on the format. The CD version added voices, with localized releases in Japanese, French, and German, as well as additional music and sound effects over the floppy disk versions. Later that summer, Sierra announced that there would be three versions of the game released: the CD-ROM version, a floppy disk version with the same 256-color VGA graphics, and a 16-color EGA version for older computers. These were released for MS-DOS in November 1990. The Amiga and Macintosh floppy disk versions followed in 1991, though the Atari ST version was never released.

Sierra also initially announced that in 1991 it would sell a bundle of the CD versions of King's Quest V, Mother Goose, Jones in the Fast Lane (1991), and Stellar 7 (1990), along with a Sound Blaster sound card and a mixer to combine the sound card and CD sound sources. This bundle was later cancelled, as Ken Williams claimed the hardware market was changing too rapidly. Ports for the Japanese FM Towns and PC-98 computers were released in 1991. A Nintendo Entertainment System version of the game with reduced graphics was later developed by Novotrade International and published by Konami in June 1992. A Sega CD port was announced in 1992, but was never released.

== Reception ==
Reception

Review scores
Publication	Score
Amiga Power	83%
Dragon	4/5
PC Games (US)	71%
The Games Machine (Italy)	85%
The One	90%
CU Amiga	89%
PC Review	5/10
Videogame & Computer World	9/10

King's Quest V was the best-selling computer game of January and February 1991, according to the Software Publishers Association, and remained in the top ten to the end of the year. The CD version stayed popular for several years, rising into the top ten best-selling CD games of the month as late as June 1993. King's Quest V sold 300,000 copies by early 1992 according to Sierra, with Computer Gaming World confirming in February 1993 that the game had been certified by the Software Publishers Association as having sold more than 250,000 copies. By November 2000, PC Data reported that King's Quest V's sales in the United States alone had reached between 300,000 and 400,000 units. Prior to the 1992 release of King's Quest VI, Sierra said that the series had reached 1.5 million sales overall, which it claimed was the most of any computer adventure game series.

Opinions on the gameplay were mixed. Scorpia of Computer Gaming World said that the puzzles were easy and could be brute forced by trying every item in the player's inventory, but found frustrating the puzzles that required quick reactions or where a wrong choice or direction would instantly kill Graham, especially in the desert. Matt Regan of CU Amiga similarly said that the game's puzzles were a mix of trivial and impossible. The reviewer for Dragon and Paul Presley of The One Amiga found the game challenging, and they and Leslie Mizell of Game Players found the game challenging and good for players of multiple skill levels. Theo Clarke of Strategy Plus said that the puzzles were all easy given the game's clues, but Russ Ceccola of Compute! and the reviewer for PC Games, however, said that it was possibly too challenging due to some convoluted plotting. The point-and-click interface was widely praised; the reviewer for Videogame & Computer World and Mark Ramshaw of Amiga Power particularly noted it as superior and easier to use than text-based parsers.

King's Quest V, especially the CD version, was noted in contemporary reviews as being difficult to run on most computers of the time. Strategy Plus, Game Players, and Amiga Power all said that it took "the very limit of current PC games hardware" to run the game without lengthy loading from disks. Strategy Plus and Computer Gaming World also both noted that the game itself would run slowly on computers with older processors. Paul Presley of PC Review especially found it difficult to run the CD version of the game at all with the hardware limitations of their computer.

The graphics were widely praised; Computer Gaming World called the game "a graphic tour-de-force" and CU Amiga said it was a "visual delight". Dragon, The Games Machine, and PC Games all praised the hand-painted backgrounds, with Strategy Plus calling it significantly better than prior Sierra games. Don Trivette of PC Magazine praised the animations as well, as did The Games Machine. The music was also applauded, with Dragon and Compute! calling it "brilliant" and "superb", Computer Gaming World saying that it was the best of any Sierra game, and Videogame & Computer World comparing it to movie soundtracks. The Games Machine, in contrast, said that the audio for voices was "monotonous, crackly, and grating"; retrospective coverage has also noted the voice acting as having low-quality audio. Computer Gaming World concluded that the combination of graphics and music created "the feeling of being in some magical realm, where anything can happen".

The story and writing itself was noted as being very "cute" and "Disney-like", with mixed opinions on its appeal to adults; PC Review and Dragon said it was good for a family audience, and Computer Gaming World and Videogame & Computer World enjoyed the plot. The One Amiga and PC Games, however, found it too much of a cute fairy tale. Amiga Power furthermore found the plot to be clichéd and unoriginal.

== Legacy ==
According to Sierra On-Line, combined sales of the King's Quest series surpassed 3.8 million units by the end of March 1996. King's Quest V won "Best Fantasy Role-Playing/Adventure Program" at the Software Publishers Association awards in 1991. Computer Gaming World named the game as its 1991 Adventure Game of the Year, and in 1992 named it to the magazine's Hall of Fame for games readers rated highly over time. In 1996 it named King's Quest V the 94th best game ever.

The King's Quest series, which has been described as Sierra's "flagship series", includes a further three games by Sierra, beginning with King's Quest VI in 1992 and concluding with King's Quest: Mask of Eternity in 1998. King's Quest V has been released in several collections of games in the series in the 1990s and 2000s. It is also included in the modern King's Quest Collection on Steam and the King's Quest 4+5+6 collection released on GOG. In 1988, Silicon Valley Books published The King's Quest Companion, a combination hint guide and novelization by Peter Spear of the games in the series. Updated editions were released through 1997 as further games were released in the series.

== Sources ==
- Mills, Shawn (2020). The Sierra Adventure: The Story of Sierra On-Line. ISBN 978-1-71675-872-0.
- Spear, Peter (1993). The King's Quest Companion (3rd ed.). Osborne/McGraw-Hill. ISBN 978-0-07-881815-8.
- Spear, Peter (1997). The King's Quest Companion (4th ed.). Osborne/McGraw-Hill. ISBN 978-0-07-882401-2.
- Trivette, Donald B. (1988). The Official Book of King's Quest: Daventry and Beyond (PDF) (1st ed.). Compute! Books. ISBN 0-87455-155-2.
- Trivette, Donald B. (1991). The Official Book of King's Quest: Daventry and Beyond (PDF) (2nd ed.). Compute! Books. ISBN 0-87455-245-1.
- Williams, John (1994). King's Quest Collector's Edition – Care Guide (PDF). Sierra Entertainment.
