= Jones in the Fast Lane =

1991 video game

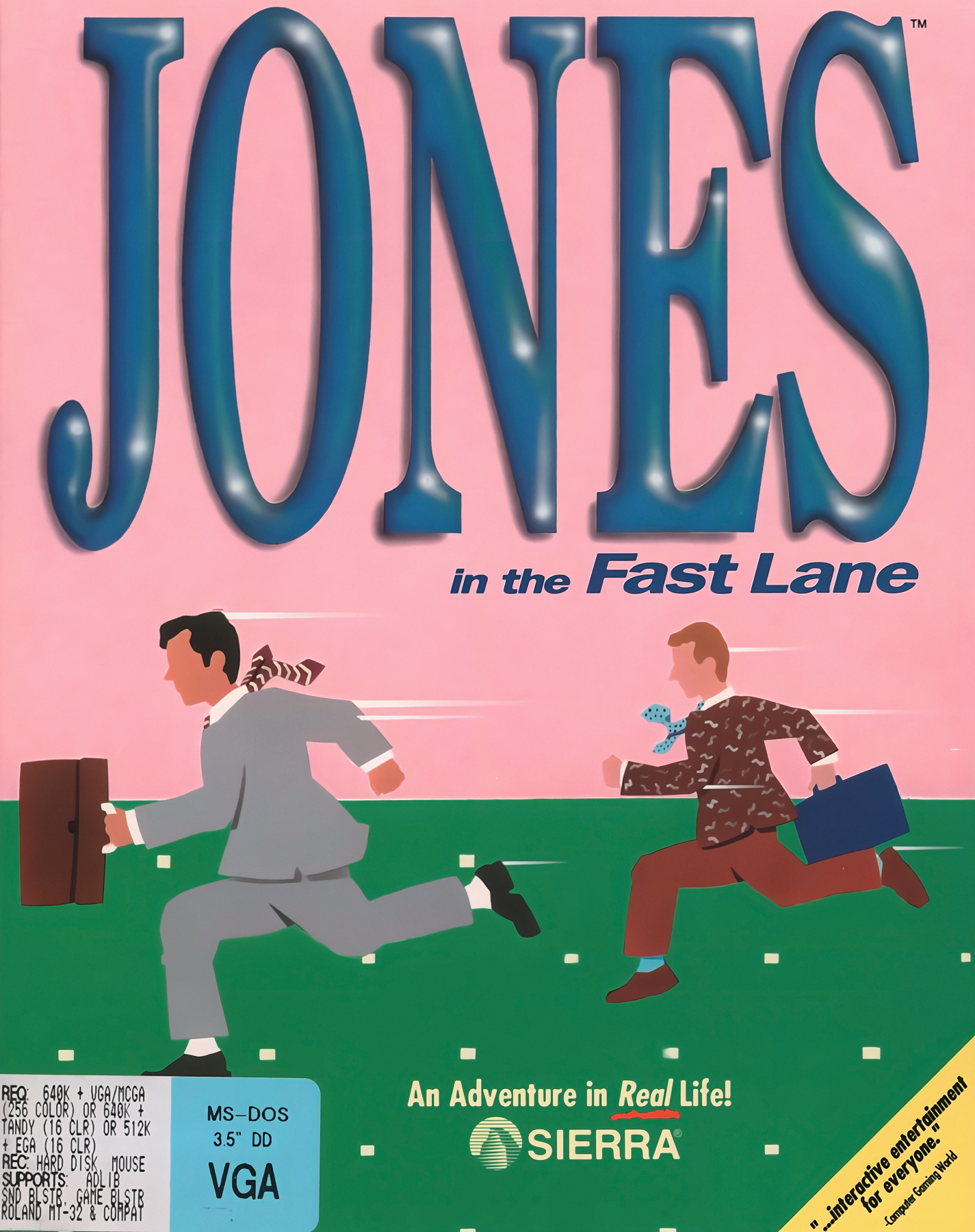
- Cover art
- Developer: Sierra On-Line
- Publisher: Sierra On-Line
- Director: Bill Davis
- Producer: Guruka Singh Khalsa
- Programmer: Warren Schwader
- Artists: James Larsen; Andy Hoyos
- Writers: Josh Mandel; Sol Ackerman; Warren Schwader
- Composer: Ken Allen
- Engine: SCI1
- Platforms: MS-DOS, Windows 3.1x
- Release: NA: 1991 (Floppy disk); NA: 1992 (CD-ROM)
- Genre: Social simulation
- Modes: Single-player, multiplayer

Jones in the Fast Lane is a social simulation game for MS-DOS compatible operating systems. It was developed and published by Sierra On-Line in 1991. Using a board game motif, the objective is to attain certain amounts of money, happiness, status, and education. The exact amounts needed are defined by the player(s) when the game begins. The game's name and goals are a play on the concept of keeping up with the Joneses.

== Gameplay ==
Screenshot

The game world is represented by a board game-like ring of buildings in squares, resembling a cross between Monopoly and Careers. The game can be played by up to four players, who take turns "living" their respective weeks. If only one player is present, he or she may play against the titular "Jones".

Each player is represented by a coloured marble on the board. Players are free to move around in either direction, only limited by the time remaining per turn. Time is used up by moving to a new location and by performing actions like working, attending class, or resting. Each turn represents a week of the character's life, during which the player decides what the character does.

On weekends, each character experiences an "Oh What a Weekend" event, which uses up some money (usually less than $200), or, if the player has got a computer, creates some money in the form of earnings. These events are usually based on a purchase that the player made during his or her previous week, such as attending a show if the player purchased theater or concert tickets. The event can also be random, described to the player with traditional Sierra humor, e.g. "You went to Las Vegas in a $20,000 car and came back in a $200,000 Greyhound bus."

If the player chooses to deposit all his or her cash in the bank at the end of week or simply ends the week with no cash, then no money will be spent over the weekend. This also prevents a visit to the doctor, which uses up time.

The object of the game is to be the first player to achieve 100% success. This is achieved by reaching the top of four goals. The goals are wealth, happiness, education and career. Wealth is achieved by having a certain level of money in the bank, shares and cash in hand. The player normally earns this money by going to work. Happiness is achieved by achieving other goals, acquiring goods and taking time off work. Education is achieved by completing the available university qualifications. The number of qualifications the player must complete will depend upon how high the goal level is set. Career is achieved by climbing the career ladder into a management position in a particular job.

The game has several fail states, such as when a player exits the bank or Black's Market, the player may have his or her money stolen by Wild Willy. Wild Willy, from time to time, may also rip off the Low Cost Housing apartments, taking items from all players living there, such as TV sets and VCRs. Wild Willy will never rip off the Security Apartments. Other fail states may include a bank glitch, causing the loss of savings in the banks and the loss of the players' jobs.

The game has a changing economy where prices may increase or drop, including rents and wages. If prices drop, the player will normally stay on the same wage, but if the player changes jobs he or she may be forced to take a pay cut. The player can choose to lock in a lower rent when prices are low and continue to pay that price for the remainder of the game regardless of increases to prices.

Most buildings feature a live-action clerk or store person who greets the player with a variety of humorous phrases, complete with lip-syncing.

== Development ==
The game's working title was Keeping Up with Jones. Jones in the Fast Lane was entirely developed as a set of storyboards before artwork or coding commenced. The "board game" interface was aimed at ensuring the rules were intuitive and accessible to younger or inexperienced players. The 256-color VGA graphics were impressive for the time, with most computer games still produced in 16-color EGA. Produced in 1990, its 1992 CD-ROM version was one of the first games to run in Windows 3.1x, which was released that year.

Monolith Burger, a fast food restaurant in Jones in the Fast Lane, is a reference to the restaurant of the same name in another Sierra series, Space Quest. Bill Davis, Jones in the Fast Lane's designer, stated that it is "the game you'll bring out when friends drop by, or when the family just can't take one more evening of Trivial Pursuit."

Porcelain Fortress was inspired by Jones in the Fast Lane to create the 2019 game No Time to Relax.

== Reception ==
The One gave the MS-DOS version of Jones in the Fast Lane an overall score of 88%, calling it a "good example" of how to implement the gameplay of a board game on a computer. The One praises Jones in the Fast Lane's graphics, music and gameplay, expressing that gameplay has a "generally good feeling", noting the game's digitized actors and the varying music for each game location, furthermore stating that Jones has "first-class presentation". The One praises the computer AI, saying that it offers "a challenge", as well as Jones' multiplayer, expressing that "Playing the game with others incites plenty of excitement .... It's this kind of intensely competitive atmosphere that makes Jones a winner."

Strategy Plus's Brian Walker wrote, "As in most Sierra games, the joy comes from the process of discovery, and Jones is no exception to this." He considered the game "fun, and easy to play", but found it overpriced given its simplicity. Walker summarized it as "one of life's less essential purchases."

Contemporary reviews describe the game as a "humorous romp through modern life" and praised the graphics and clever wordplay, but noted it was essentially a computerised board game.
