= Index of Windows games (0–9) =

This is an index of Microsoft Windows games.

This list has been split into multiple pages. Please use the Table of Contents to browse it.

Title	Released	Developer	Publisher
007 First Light	2026	IO Interactive	IO Interactive
007 Legends	2012	Eurocom	Activision
007: Quantum of Solace	2008	Treyarch	Activision
1001 Spikes	2014	8bits Fanatics	Nicalis
100ft Robot Golf	2017	No Goblin	No Goblin
101: The Airborne Invasion of Normandy	1998	Interactive Simulations	Empire Interactive
10 Second Ninja X	2016	Four Circle Interactive	Curve Digital
11-11: Memories Retold	2018	DigixArt, Aardman Animations	Bandai Namco Entertainment
The 11th Hour	1995	Trilobyte	Virgin Interactive
12Riven: The Psi-Climinal of Integral	2008	KID, Cyberfront	KID, Cyberfront, SDR Project
12 O'Clock High: Bombing the Reich	1999	TalonSoft	TalonSoft
140	2016	Double Fine Productions	Abstraction Games
1428: Shadows over Silesia	2022	KUBI Games	
15 Days	2009	House of Tales	DTP Entertainment
1914 Shells of Fury	2007	h2f Informationssysteme	Strategy First
1979 Revolution: Black Friday	2016	iNK Stories	iNK Stories
198X	2019	Hi-Bit Studios	Sonka
1993 Space Machine	2016	Modesty	
2000:1: A Space Felony	2017	National Insecurities	Humble Games
2002 FIFA World Cup	2002	EA Canada	EA Sports
2006 FIFA World Cup	2006	EA Canada	EA Sports
The 25th Ward: The Silver Case	2018	Grasshopper Manufacture	Nippon Ichi Software
25 to Life	2006	Avalanche Software	Eidos Interactive
2064: Read Only Memories	2015	MidBoss	MidBoss
2Dark	2017	Gloomywood	Bigben Interactive
NHL Open Ice	1997	Midway Games	Midway Home Entertainment, GT Interactive
3 Skulls of the Toltecs	1996	Revistronic	Warner Interactive Europe
3-D Body Adventure	1995	Knowledge Adventure	Levande Böcker
3-D Ultra NASCAR Pinball	1998	Dynamix	Sierra Attractions
3-D Ultra Pinball	1995	Dynamix	Sierra On-Line
3-D Ultra Pinball: Creep Night	1996	Dynamix	Sierra On-Line
3-D Ultra Pinball: Thrillride	2000	Dynamix	Sierra Entertainment
3D Maze Man: Amazing Adventures	1998	Webfoot Technologies	eGames
3D Railroad Master	1998	Computer Systems Odessa Corp.	Abracadata
3D Ultra Lionel Traintown	1999	Dynamix	Sierra Attractions
3D Ultra Minigolf Adventures	2007	Wanako Games	Sierra On-Line
3DiTeams	2007	Duke University Medical Center/Virtual Heroes, Inc.	Duke University Medical Center/Virtual Heroes, Inc.
The 3rd Millennium	1997	Cryo Interactive	Cryo Interactive
428: Shibuya Scramble	2018	Spike Chunsoft	Spike Chunsoft
4x4 Evo 2	2001	Terminal Reality	Gathering of Developers
4x4 Evo	2000	Terminal Reality	Gathering of Developers
5	2008	Ram	Visual Art's
50 Short Games	2014	Stephen Gillmurphy	
5D Chess with Multiverse Time Travel	2020	Thunkspace	
60 Seconds!	2015	Robot Gentleman	Robot Gentleman
6180 the moon	2014	PokPoong Games; Turtle Cream	Turtle Cream
688(I) Hunter/Killer	1997	Sonalysts Inc.	Electronic Arts
7 Billion Humans	2018	Tomorrow Corporation	Tomorrow Corporation
7 Days to Die	2013	The Fun Pimps	The Fun Pimps
7 Mages	2016	Napoleon Games	
7 Sins	2005	Monte Cristo	Digital Jesters
7 Wonders	1997	Computer Multimedia Systems	NewCom
7 Wonders of the Ancient World	2007	Hot Lava Games	MumboJumbo
The 7th Guest	1997	Trilobyte	Virgin Games
7th Legion	1997	Epic MegaGames, Vision Software	MicroProse
8-Bit Armies	2016	Petroglyph Games	Petroglyph Games
8-Bit Hordes	2016	Petroglyph Games	Petroglyph Games
80 Days	2005	Frogwares	Frogwares
80 Days (2014 video game)	2014	Inkle	Inkle
9: The Last Resort	1996	Tribeca Interactive	
911 Fire Rescue	2001	Sunstorm Interactive	WizardWorks
911 Operator	2017	Jutsu Games	PlayWay
99Vidas	2016	QuByte Interactive	QuByte Interactive
99 Levels to Hell	2013	bom667	Zaxis
99 Spirits	2012	Toraiki	Toraiki
