= Stellar 7 =

1983 video game

- Developers: Damon Slye; Dynamix (remake)
- Publishers: NA: Software Entertainment Company (Apple II); NA: Penguin Software (C64); EU: U.S. Gold; WW: Dynamix (remake)
- Designer: Damon Slye
- Programmer: Piotr Lukaszuk (remake)
- Artist: Mark Peasley (remake)
- Platforms: Apple II, Commodore 64, Amiga, MS-DOS, Classic Mac OS
- Release: 1983: Apple II; 1984: C64; Remake; 1990: MS-DOS; 1991: Amiga; 1993: Mac
- Genre: Vehicle simulation
- Mode: Single-player

Stellar 7 is a first-person tank simulation video game based on the 1980s arcade game Battlezone in which the player assumes the role of a futuristic tank pilot. The game was created by Damon Slye for the Apple II and Commodore 64 in 1983, then remade in the early 1990s for MS-DOS, Amiga, and Classic Mac OS. There are three sequels: Arcticfox (1986), Nova 9: The Return of Gir Draxon (1991), and Stellar 7: Draxon's Revenge (1993).

== Gameplay ==
The player's tank, the Raven, has a front-facing cannon with an unlimited supply of bullets. The cannon can fire up to two shots at a time. The tank also has a cloaking device that, when triggered, renders it invisible to enemies for about a minute. Gauges on the right side of the screen indicate the amount of shields and power remaining. The tank starts with enough power to cloak twice, and power slowly trickles away as the time passes. The game ends when either shields or power runs out.

Each of the seven levels represents a different star system (hence the title of the game). The player's objective is to get to the last level and defeat the enemy boss, Gir Draxon. Each level is depicted as a nearly featureless plane dotted by geometric obstacles—some indestructible and most not—and various enemies. After the player destroys a certain number of enemies, a warp link will appear that provides a gateway to the next level.

Special power-ups can be accessed by pressing the tab key to toggle between the different icons at the bottom left of the screen and then pushing enter, or simply by pushing the letter key corresponding to the desired icon. The icon for the chosen item will turn purple while activated. Each power-up is represented by a certain symbol and can be used up to three times throughout the game, depending on the difficulty setting.

The MS-DOS version of this game is somewhat different. The graphics are more advanced and rendered in a full range of colors, and has more complex world background paintings. Also, the cloaking device is not integrated into the tank and does not end the game or destroys the tank when it ends. Each world is guarded by a boss that must be defeated before the warp-link to the next level appears. Most of the bosses are not particularly complicated compared to the sequel (Nova 9), but they present a reasonable challenge for the time. The power-up system also works differently. By killing three of specific enemy types, a power-up will drop, and then activate when touched; different enemies produce different power-ups following this system. Finally, the game has a "Continue" feature, as opposed to simply ending when the tank is destroyed. Other differences exist between the enemy types and behaviors and the same applies to power-ups.

== Plot ==
Gir Draxon, an evil alien overlord in charge of a powerful interstellar empire has conquered a range of star systems and has now arrived in the Solar System on Mars, intending on crushing humanity. The hero of the story has a super-tank that he can use to defeat Draxon's forces, though it was called into service before being finished and thus is protected only by energy shields and has no armor. From a game mechanics perspective, this explains why the tank simply is destroyed when its shields (hit points) run out. The hero fights his way through 7 star systems controlled by Draxon's empire, until arriving on the last planet, Arcturus, to face Gir Draxon. The alien overlord confronts the hero in personal combat in his own super-tank; when defeated, an escape pod is clearly seen rocketing off into space, making it clear that Draxon survived.

The third game in the series, Nova 9, vastly expanded the in-game plot, added cut scenes, dialog, and more story-related tension. Not much information is provided about the world's background at the time.

== Reception ==
Softline stated in 1983 that "combining first-rate graphics and sound effects with fast-paced, arcade-style excitement makes Stellar 7 hard to beat in every sense". Video magazine reviewed the Apple II version of the game, describing it as "a severe test for even the most skillful home arcaders" whose "varied action makes it a particularly satisfying game for solo players". Creative Computing in 1984 described Stellar 7 on Apple as an excellent Battlezone adaptation. Praising its 3-D realism, the magazine concluded "Play it once, and you are forever addicted". Tom Clancy in 1988 named Stellar 7 one of his two favorite computer games, stating that "it is so unforgiving, it is just like life". In 1991 the DOS version of the remake received 5 out of 5 stars in Dragon.
