= Aces of the Deep =

1994 video game

- Developer: Dynamix
- Publisher: Sierra On-Line
- Producer: Mike Jones
- Designers: Langdon Beeck; Mike Jones; Dennis A. Kilgore; Alan Roberts
- Programmers: Langdon Beeck; Piotr Lukaszuk
- Artists: Jarrett Jester; Kyle Miller
- Composer: Jan Paul Moorhead
- Platform: MS-DOS
- Release: 1994
- Genre: Submarine simulator
- Mode: Single-player

Aces of the Deep is a World War II submarine simulator game developed by Dynamix for MS-DOS in 1994. The game was re-released by Sierra On-Line for Windows in 1995 as Command: Aces of the Deep. Aces of the Deep was the last installment of Dynamix's Aces series, which included the flight simulators Red Baron, Aces of the Pacific, and Aces Over Europe. However, unlike its predecessors, Aces of the Deep simulates a Kriegsmarine U-boat during World War II.

A unique feature was that Aces of the Deep came with a realistic Kriegsmarine War Grid map in which the player used in reference to finding their patrol zones. There is also an extensive in-game manual that covers the development of the U-boat, time-line based maps that show kill-to-loss ratios, and, on the CD-ROM version, video interviews with former German U-boat captains.

== Gameplay ==
The game includes single mission mode, where the player can choose to attack a convoy, a taskforce of warships (consisting of cruisers and/or battleships), or a carrier task-force in a variety of conditions. There are also several historical missions where the player can replay the role of some of Germany's greatest U-boat captains.

Alongside the single missions, Aces of the Deep includes a single player Career Mode where the player can choose which year of the war he wants to start his career, up until the end of the war. Career features the "Nightclub" for war news, scuttlebutt, and viewing the tonnage board. Within the Career Mode the player can receive promotions, medals, and opportunities to take command of newer U-boats. There are three models of U-boats in several variations for the player to choose from, each of which becomes available during its historical period.

The game includes a rich variety of ships, ranging from oil tankers and merchant ships to large troop ships, several different escorts such as corvettes, frigates and destroyers, and warships such as cruisers, battleships and carriers. It also includes a variety of aircraft on anti-submarine patrols. All these vessels are historically based, and their appearance in the game coincides with their historical appearance on the battlefield. The tactics and weapons used by the ships within the game are also historically based.

Command: Aces of the Deep updated the graphics to a higher resolution. This re-release also integrated an expansion that brought in the Type XXI and Type XXIII U-boats.

== Expansions ==
An expansion package for either the floppy or CD versions of Aces of the Deep adds brand new missions, areas and a special prototype XXI U-boat submarine.

Some of the more interesting features are the six new historical missions as well as the ability to enter (but possibly not leave due to currents) the Mediterranean Sea. Also included are buoyancy gauges which allows a quicker reading of your depth in the ocean. Most amazing is the prototype Type XXI U-boat, which includes sonar and radar abilities as well as two kinds of torpedo types for its exclusive use.

== Re-releases ==
In 1995, there also was an updated Windows version released on CD-ROM called Command: Aces of the Deep. While the gameplay is unchanged it adds new textures, voice acting and video interviews with German submariners. It also added the option, with a compatible sound card & microphone, to use voice control for certain submarine actions, like dive and fire, which is why the game received the expanded title. An on-line manual gives detailed information about the historical background and submarine tactics. It also features historical maps, movies, photos and articles.

== Reception ==
Reception

Review score
| Publication | Score |
|---|---|
| PC Gamer | 82% |

In 1996 Computer Gaming World ranked Aces of the Deep as the 71st best game of all time, calling it "still unrivaled for creating an authentic atmosphere."
