= Front Page Sports =

Front Page Sports was a series of video games created by Sierra On-Line.

- Front Page Sports Baseball
- Front Page Sports Football
- Front Page Sports: Golf
- Front Page Sports: Ski Racing
