= 3-D Ultra NASCAR Pinball =

1998 video game

- North American box art
- Developer: Dynamix
- Publisher: Sierra Attractions
- Series: 3-D Ultra Pinball
- Platforms: Windows, Mac OS
- Release: December 1, 1998
- Genre: Pinball
- Modes: Single-player, multiplayer

3-D Ultra NASCAR Pinball is a 1998 pinball video game for Windows and Mac OS, and the fourth game in 3-D Ultra Pinball series. It was released under the title 3-D Ultra Pinball: Turbo Racing in Europe. The game uses an improved graphics engine first used in 3-D Ultra Pinball: Thrillride, which takes advantage of greater color depth and resolution up to 800x600 pixels. The game includes multimedia information about four NASCAR tracks, namely Bristol Motor Speedway, Talladega Superspeedway, Atlanta Motor Speedway, and Watkins Glen International Raceway; but only includes a single Speedway table alongside Garage and Pit Stop tables.

== Gameplay ==
Up to four players play a virtual pinball simulation with a NASCAR theme.

Players can play a full season of races racing as Dale Earnhardt, Bobby Labonte, Terry Labonte or Bill Elliott. The choice of driver only affects some graphics, and some callouts by the in-game commentators. Play begins on the Garage table in which the player uses a single ball to hit targets to improve their car for the race. This is followed by a 60-second qualifying lap on the Speedway table which determines the players starting position in the race. Four ramps on this table represent the four turns of the racetrack. When the race begins, players have up to five balls or until a timer ends to finish the race. During a race players can start the Pit Stop table, to increase score and improve efficiency of their car. The players finishing position in each race is tracked across an entire NASCAR season.

== Development ==
The pit crew on the Pit Stop table were motion captured.

Reception

Review scores
Publication	Score
Computer Gaming World	3/5
IGN	3/10
PC Gamer (US)	65/100
Gamezilla!	79%
Happy Puppy	5/10

== Reception ==
The game was nominated for "PC Family Title of the Year" at the 2nd Annual Interactive Achievement Awards organized by the Academy of Interactive Arts & Sciences.

Game reviews were mixed; IGN found the game to be sub-par without attention to detail, with dated physics and graphics, though found the design of the table to be clever.

The Chicago Tribune said the game does a good job of presenting the various stages of a race day, but that only die-hard NASCAR fans would enjoy it.

Gamezilla! found a solidly-constructed fun game with crisp sounds that is entertaining for a modest price, although doesn't break any "significant ground" in gaming.

HappyPuppy criticized the lack of depth.

== See also ==
- NASCAR Racing
