= Rise of the Dragon =

1990 video game

- Developers: Dynamix; Game Arts (Sega CD)
- Publishers: Sierra On-Line; Sega (Sega CD)
- Directors: Jeff Tunnell; Alan McKean
- Designer: Jeff Tunnell
- Programmers: Dariusz Lukaszuk; Richard Rayl; Kevin Ryan
- Artists: Randy Dersham (art director); Robert Caracol (concept art)
- Writers: Jerry Luttrell; David Selle
- Composers: Don Latarski (original score); Christopher Stevens (music); Noriyuki Iwadare (Sega CD)
- Platforms: Amiga, MS-DOS, Classic Mac OS, Sega CD
- Release: MS-DOS; Q4 1990; Amiga; 1991; Mac; September 1991; Sega CD; JP: September 25, 1992; NA: 1993
- Genre: Point-and-click adventure
- Mode: Single-player

Rise of the Dragon is a point-and-click adventure video game developed by Dynamix and published in 1990 by Sierra On-Line for MS-DOS. It was the first Cyberpunk game from Dynamix, distinct from its portfolio of action and flight simulators. Set in a future dystopian version of Los Angeles, circa 2053, it follows the story of detective William 'Blade' Hunter as he investigates the death of the mayor's daughter, linked to a dangerous new drug, MTZ. The gameplay combines detective work, strategy, and action. Players must solve puzzles that influence the storyline, interact with characters who remember past choices, and tackle action sequences. If players fail these sequences multiple times, the game may offer to automatically complete them.

Rise of the Dragon was ported to Classic Mac OS and Amiga. A Sega CD version added voice acting and some changes in content. The game's reception was generally positive, with critics noting its effective capture of a cyberpunk atmosphere, detailed graphics, and the non-linear approach to puzzle-solving. It garnered awards for artistic achievement but received some criticism for its control scheme and user interface.

== Gameplay ==
Gameplay in Rise of the Dragon is similar to that of Dynamix's other 1990s adventure games, The Adventures of Willy Beamish and Heart of China. The screen shows the current room roughly from the protagonist Blade's perspective. Movement occurs with the cursor, which becomes an arrow to proceed to another room or a magnifying glass to get closer to a part of the current scene.

The game has a time meter that reflects the passage of time in the game. Each of Blade's actions takes up a certain amount of time. Some game events will only occur at particular times. The player must find a way to delay the plans of the game's villains, or the game will end after only three days and Blade will not have time to save the day. Travelling between locations can take up a lot of in-game time, so players must plan their moves strategically.

Several puzzles in Rise of the Dragon have multiple possible solutions. Blade's activities can influence the plot of the game later on. Game characters remember his earlier behavior, and if he says the wrong thing to key characters they will refuse to help him with his work, which can render the game unwinnable.

Rise of the Dragon features two action scenes and an aim-and-shoot scene. It is possible to beat the game without playing through all of these scenes. If the player tries and fails to complete the action scenes several times, the game will offer the chance to automatically win the sequence and move on to the next scene.

== Plot ==
In 2053, William 'Blade' Hunter is a former Los Angeles Police Department officer turned private detective. When the mayor's rebellious daughter Chandra is found dead and horribly mutated after experimenting with a new designer drug called MTZ, Blade is called upon to track down those responsible. Blade makes contact with a streetwise friend of Chandra's nicknamed "the Jake", who indicates Chen Lu as the dealer who supplied Chandra with the lethal drug. Blade goes to Chen Lu's apartment only to find Lu assassinated with an overdose of MTZ, as punishment for attracting public attention by causing the death of a politician's daughter.

As Blade tries to reconcile with his girlfriend Karyn, who works at the Crime Records Bureau, he enlists her help to track down Lu's accomplices and discover the mutagenic nature of the MTZ drug. It is revealed that the MTZ business is part of an underground Chinese Mafia operation led by Deng Hwang, a megalomaniacal drug kingpin intent on world domination. Blade also meets an old fortune teller, who tells him the present year coincides with that of the foretold coming of Chinese dragon Bahumat.

Blade disrupts the MTZ production schedule by blowing up the local drug plant, but in doing so he is spotted by Hwang's men. Hwang has the Jake captured in an attempt to lure Blade into a trap, but Blade manages to rescue the Jake and later sabotages the Triad's plans to poison the Hollywood reservoir with MTZ and exterminate the population of Los Angeles. In retaliation, Hwang has Karyn kidnapped and strapped to a chair, threatening to inject MTZ into her system.

Blade infiltrates Hwang's headquarters and, depending on the player's actions, either manages or fails to rescue Karyn. He eventually comes face-to-face with Hwang himself, who suddenly transforms into the dragon Bahumat. In a climactic final battle, Bahumat is defeated by Blade. Outside the headquarters, Blade is greeted by the mayor but angrily punches him for using Blade as a pawn in his covert drug bust and endangering his life and Karyn's. Blade then walks away either with Karyn, if she has survived, or alone.

== Ports ==
Developed by Game Arts, the Sega CD version adds voice audio to the game (including Cam Clarke in the main role as William 'Blade' Hunter). It was given an MA-17 rating by the Videogame Rating Council. A scene with a French kiss and implied sex was removed from the Sega CD release.

== Reception ==
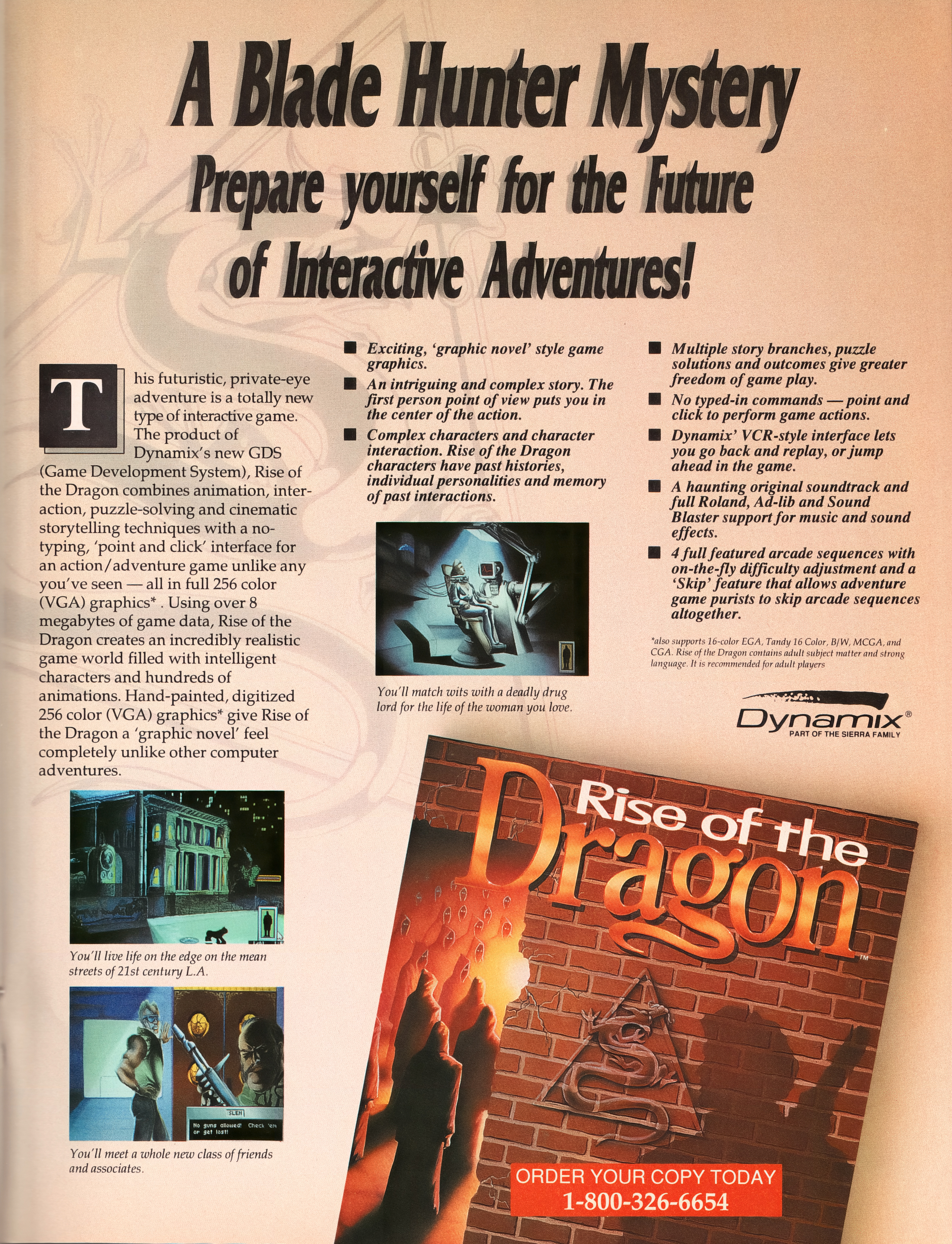
Magazine ad

Reception

Review scores
Publication	Score
Dragon	5/5 (DOS)
The One	92% (Amiga); 89% (DOS)
Electronic Gaming Monthly	7.6/10 (Sega CD)

Award
Publication	Award
Computer Gaming World	Special Award for Artistic Achievement (1991)

Rise of the Dragon was a commercial hit; Craig Ritchie of Retro Gamer later called it "very successful".

Computer Gaming World stated that Rise of the Dragon more effectively depicted a cyberpunk atmosphere than other games. The magazine liked the story, non-text parser interface, audio, and the fact that completing the arcade sequences was optional, and concluded that the game "is not only an outstanding product in its own right, but points the way for the future of graphic adventures". Dragon gave the game 5 out of 5 stars.

The One gave the Amiga version of Rise of the Dragon an overall score of 92%, noting "evident" stylistic influence from Blade Runner, and praising the game's graphics, stating that "Rise of the Dragon has probably some of the most detailed artwork yet seen in an adventure". The One calls Rise of the Dragon a "very entertaining futuristic tale, with plenty of challenge" and praises the game's plot twists, and the game's multiple endings. The One also expresses the need for lateral thinking in regards to the game's puzzles, stating that the player must "put a lot of thought into what [they're] doing". The One criticises the controls and UI, calling the controls "a little limiting", and expresses that they require getting used to. The One's review of the DOS version of Rise of the Dragon echoed the opinion of the Amiga version, giving it 89%, and praising its graphics and "near-faultless" design.

Jim Trunzo reviewed Rise of the Dragon in White Wolf #30 (Feb., 1992), rating it a 4 out of 5 and stated that "Rise of the Dragon mesmerizes the gamer, drawing him into the story within the first half hour of play. And once in the claws of the Dragon, there really is no way out. Unless you can destroy him."

In 1991, Rise of the Dragon won a Special Award for Artistic Achievement from Computer Gaming World. In 1996, the magazine ranked it as the 83rd best game of all time, stating: "So good that a rival publisher tried to steal it, this cyberpunk game used rotoscoping, hot spot mapping, and cinematic cuts long before they were standard", and the 12th most innovative computer game for pioneering of "using a dynamic, hot-spotted map as the game world travel interface". In 1991, PC Format named Rise of the Dragon one of the 50 best computer games ever. The editors wrote: "When you do finish marvelling at the excellent on-screen graphics, you'll want to get right into the action too".

Electronic Gaming Monthly deemed the Sega CD version "an almost perfect translation of the PC title". Though they criticized the absence of replay value, they approved of the gritty tone and "atmospheric" graphics, and scored it a 7.6 out of 10.

A Computer Games Strategy Plus retrospective in 2000 summarized Rise of the Dragon as "an underrated classic [...] way ahead of its time".
