= Red Baron II =

1997 video game

- Developer: Dynamix
- Publisher: Sierra On-Line
- Director: Tucker Hatfield
- Producer: Graeme Bayless
- Designers: Doug Johnson; Brian Apgar; Eric Lanz
- Programmer: Brian Apgar
- Artist: Douglas Brashear
- Platform: Microsoft Windows
- Release: NA: December 16, 1997; EU: 1997; Red Baron 3D: NA: October 29, 1998; EU: 1998
- Genre: Combat flight simulator
- Modes: Single-player, multiplayer

Red Baron II is a video game for the PC, developed by Dynamix and published by Sierra On-Line. It is the follow-up to the flight simulation Red Baron, released in 1990. Red Baron II was released in December 1997. A patch was released in 1998 that added support for 3D acceleration and renamed the game to Red Baron 3D. Red Baron 3D was also released as a retail product.

== Gameplay ==
The game features four modes of play: Fly Now (a quick combat mode); Single Mission, which includes several missions and a mission generator to create new ones; Campaign mode, which featured a dynamic campaign which replicates combat on the Western Front of Europe from 1916 through 1918; and peer-to-peer online play.

The game features many German, British, and French combat aircraft of World War I, and features pseudo-realistic flight physics and mechanics such as weapon malfunction, flak, engine damage, and pilot injury.

== Reception ==
Red Baron II

Aggregate score
Aggregator	Score
GameRankings	65%

Review scores
Publication	Score
CNET Gamecenter	7/10
Computer Games Strategy Plus	2/5
Computer Gaming World	3/5
GameRevolution	A−
GameSpot	7.1/10
GameStar	78%
Next Generation	4/5
PC Gamer (UK)	53%
PC Gamer (US)	59%
PC PowerPlay	92%
PC Zone	60%

Red Baron II received above-average reviews. Next Generation called it "a fine addition to the series, and despite small, technical shortcomings, it establishes itself as one of the most entertaining flight experiences on the market today."

The game was nominated for the "Best Sim Game" award at the CNET Gamecenter Awards for 1997, which went to Jane's Longbow 2.

In 2004, the staff of Computer Gaming World nominated the game's Full Canvas Jacket mod for their 2003 "Flight Simulation of the Year" award, which ultimately went to Flight Simulator 2004: A Century of Flight.

== Coupon ==
Some copies of the game included a coupon for 75 cents off a 12-inch Red Baron pizza. In 2014, YouTube user Clint Basinger of Lazy Game Reviews found the coupon bundled in with the game and, after finding out the coupon had no expiration date, took the coupon to a Food Lion and bought himself a Red Baron pizza with the coupon.

== Red Baron 3D ==
Red Baron 3D is a patch for Red Baron II which improves graphics and mechanics of the game and gives full multiplayer support. Red Baron 3D features 22 different flyable World War I aircraft, along with 18 other types flown by AI pilots.

=== Reception ===
Red Baron 3D

Review scores
Publication	Score
AllGame	4.5/5
Computer Gaming World	4.5/5
GameSpot	9/10
GameStar	78%
Jeuxvideo.com	15/20
Next Generation	4/5
PC PowerPlay	87%
The Cincinnati Enquirer	3.5/4

Red Baron 3D received more favorable reviews than Red Baron II. Next Generation said of the game, "If you've ever hankered to climb into an open cockpit and do battle with the early knights of the sky, this is your baby. All you need is a leather helmet, a pair of goggles, and a white silk scarf."

The single-player campaign of Red Baron 3D received particular acclaim, with critics commending the game's realistic portrayal of aerial combat and the various missions players were tasked with completing. The game's AI was also noted as being challenging and unpredictable, keeping players engaged and on their toes throughout the campaign.

The game was nominated for "Simulation of the Year" at GameSpot's Best & Worst of 1998 Awards, which went to European Air War.
