= Arcticfox =

1986 video game

- Cover art by John Mattos
- Developer: Dynamix
- Publishers: NA: Electronic Arts; EU: Ariolasoft
- Producer: Joe Ybarra
- Programmers: Damon Slye; Richard Hicks; Jeffrey Tunnell; Kevin Ryan
- Artist: John Burton
- Platforms: Amiga, Apple II, Atari ST, Commodore 64, ZX Spectrum, MSX, MS-DOS
- Release: 1986
- Genre: Vehicle simulation
- Mode: Single-player

Arcticfox is a science fiction tank simulation video game developed by Dynamix and published by Electronic Arts in 1986. It was published in Europe by Ariolasoft.

== Description ==
The game is set in a fictional 2005 where aliens have taken over Antarctica in an attempt to steal the Earth's oxygen. The player is sent to eradicate the intruders using a new super tank codenamed Arcticfox.

== Gameplay ==
Gameplay screenshot (Atari ST)

The player must pilot the tank into enemy territory with the goal of knocking out the alien base. The player uses the tank's abilities to destroy the aliens' ships and equipment. The Arcticfox tank is equipped with a cannon, guided missiles, land mines, and is outfitted with radar, a GPS device, and fore and aft viewscreens. The player fights a variety of enemy units including planes, tanks, bunkers and communication towers.

The vantage point for the game is the cockpit of the Arcticfox tank. The player can see out of the main viewscreen as well as the tank's sundry features such as the radar screen. The view also shows the character's hand on the joystick which moves in accordance with the tank's movements. Enemy targets are visible on the view screens and on radar.

== Publication history ==
In 1983, Damon Slye of Dynamix created Stellar 7, a science fiction tank simulation game reminiscent of the video arcade game Battlezone. In 1986, Dynamix released a sequel, Arcticfox, for Atari ST, Commodore 64, ZX Spectrum, MSX, MS-DOS, and Apple II.

A third game in the series,Nova 9: The Return of Gir Draxon, was released in 1991.

Arcticfox's design team at Dynamix went on to produce The Incredible Machine and Red Baron.

== Reception ==
Roy Wagner, writing for Computer Gaming World, called Arcticfox "the first original new [EA game] that uses the distinctive features of the Amiga", calling the graphics and sound "Sensational!". It advised using a joystick instead of the mouse. In 1996, the magazine ranked the Amiga version of Arcticfox as the 138th best game of all time, calling it "the seminal 3D polygon-based shooter".

Compute! also praised the Amiga version, and stated that the game would appeal to those who enjoyed both strategy and arcade action.

In Issue 8 of Gateways, Charles and Sydney Barouch noted this game was "very reminiscent of the arcade game Battlezone, but the improvement here consists mainly in a highly sophisticated control panel and the addition of color." The Barouches concluded, "As a shoot-'em-up, it plays well but is challenging in that it requires a lot of practice to get much done."

John Manor of Antic loved the immersive gameplay of the Atari ST version, and concluded that it was a game that the players will return to play time and time again.

Tom Malcolm, writing for Info, gave the Commodore 64 version four-plus stars out of five, mentioning its "great 3-D graphics", "intuitive control interface", and control over missiles.

The staff of Crash magazine were critical of the ZX Spectrum version of the game, giving it an overall score of 41%.

== See also ==
- Skyfox (1984), EA's first game with the "fox" suffix. The sequel, Skyfox II, was developed by Dynamix.
