= Take a break =

"Take a break" means to take a rest.

Take a break or Take a Break may also refer to:

- Take a Break (magazine), a UK magazine
- Take a Break (album), a 2003 cover album by Me First and the Gimme Gimmes
- "Take a Break" (Hamilton song), a song from the 2015 Broadway musical Hamilton
- "Take a Break", a song by German dance group Scooter from The Stadium Techno Experience
- Take a Break! Pinball, a computer game
- Take a Break (Music Festival / Party), a Dallas, Texas–based House-Music Festival.

== See also ==
- "Take a Break from Your Values", a 2014 episode of season 2 of Orange Is the New Black
