= Front Page Sports Football Pro =

1993 video game

- Developer: Dynamix
- Publisher: Dynamix
- Platform: MS-DOS
- Release: 1993
- Genre: Sports

Front Page Sports Football Pro is sports video game developed and published by Dynamix. It was released for MS-DOS in 1993 as part of the Front Page Sports Football video game series.

== Gameplay ==
The second version of the game. Front Page Sports: Football Pro was the first football game for IBM PC compatibles that allowed gamers to join an online league to compete. Each week during a simulated season, league members would send their team files to a designated commissioner to simulate the games. The commissioner would run the simulation and then return updated files to owners (typically via a web page) for the next week of play. Team owners could trade players with each other, make roster moves, and function as if they were real general managers.

== Reception ==
Reception

Review score
Publication	Score
Electronic Entertainment	9 out of 10

Computer Gaming World in 1993 stated that Front Page Sports's "remain the best in the business", and liked the uploadable game plans. It criticized the game's AI, however, for not improving sufficiently from the predecessor's, and stated that the documentation had declined in quality. The magazine concluded that "Front Page Sports Pro is a nice step forward ... but that is all it is: a step", and "nothing but an upgrade to a great product", and only recommended it to those playing in online leagues. Football Pro won the magazine's Sports Game of the Year award in June 1994. The editors wrote, "Since its inception, Front Page Sports Football has been the leading football game among our readership, and the addition of real players and statistics in the latest edition makes it even better".

FPS Football Pro was named the best sports game of 1993 by Computer Games Strategy Plus. In 1994, PC Gamer US named Football Pro the 19th best computer game ever. The editors wrote, "When it comes to PC football sims, there's really only one game in town. [...] Trades, drafts, injuries, thrilling graphics, an NFL license, and just about anything else you could think of make this the best PC football around."

In 1998, PC Gamer declared it the 46th-best computer game ever released, and the editors called it "still the best all-around football game out there".
