= 3D Ultra Minigolf (game series) =

Video game series

3D Ultra Minigolf is a series of arcade-style miniature golf titles. It began in 1997 with 3D Ultra Minigolf, with 3D Ultra Minigolf Adventures and its sequel, 3D Ultra Minigolf Adventures 2 developed by Wanako Games. 3D Ultra Minigolf Adventures has been released for Microsoft Windows and Xbox 360. The sequel was released for Xbox 360 and the Sony PlayStation 3.

== 3D Ultra Minigolf ==
3-D Ultra Minigolf, designed by Dynamix, and published by Sierra was released in May 1997. The game had 18 holes in total. GameSpot gave this game a 4.3.

== 3D Ultra Minigolf Deluxe ==
3-D Ultra Minigolf Deluxe was released by Dynamix in July 1998 and added nine new holes along with the eighteen original holes from the original. The game featured online game play, although the original had a patch to version 1.01 available that also allowed online play.

== 3D Ultra Minigolf Adventures ==
3D Ultra Minigolf Adventures was developed by Wanako Games and published by Sierra Online. It was released on December 20, 2006 for Microsoft Windows, and April 18, 2007 for Xbox 360. The game was originally going to be released in 2001 under the name Minigolf Maniacs for PC and PlayStation 2, but the closure of Dynamix left the game unfinished, and many level designs and mechanics were re-fitted for Adventures. The original Minigolf Maniacs has since received a fan completion in collaboration with the original developers, released as freeware in 2007.

== 3D Ultra Minigolf Adventures 2 ==
3D Ultra Minigolf Adventures 2 was produced by Artificial Mind and Movement Inc. and released by Konami Digital Entertainment. The game was developed by Wanako Games. The game features over 50 minigolf holes for up to four players to complete.

The Daily Herald states that 3D Ultra Minigolf Adventures 2 was released in September 2010 for Xbox 360 and PS3. However, PlayStation Network version of the game says it was released on November 16, 2010.

== See also ==
- 3-D Ultra Pinball
- 3D Ultra Lionel Traintown
