= Front Page Sports Baseball =

Front Page Sports Baseball Series
- Developer: Dynamix
- Publisher: Sierra On-Line
- Genres: Sports, Simulation
- Modes: Single player, Multiplayer, Career

Front Page Sports Baseball was a series of baseball games created by Dynamix in the mid to late 1990s. It remains popular as a simulation engine for online leagues.

== Editions ==
The first edition was Front Page Sports: Baseball '94 for DOS. This was followed by the release of Front Page Sports: Baseball Pro '96 released on 30 June 1996. Front Page Sports: Baseball Pro '98 was released on 31 May 1997.

== Gameplay ==
In batter/pitcher mode, the view is 2D. When the ball is in play the game switches to 3D mode. Team colors can be adjusted, but there are no logos on player uniforms. Each team holds 50 players: 25 players on active roster, 15 in AAA, and 10 in low minors.

== Reception ==
=== '94 ===
A reviewer for Next Generation gave Front Page Sports Baseball '94 four out of five stars, lauding it for the ability to control every aspect of the game in order to recreate any baseball game in history. He added that "Injuries, recovery time, weather conditions, and both amateur and free-agent draft options create an amazingly realistic approach to the management of baseball, while the multiple camera angles, joystick and mouse controls, and crisp VGA graphics keep the arcade aspect of play fresh and exciting."

=== '96 ===
Reception

Review score
Publication	Score
Computer Game Review	86/100

Computer Game Review's Tasos Kaiafas called the game "not much of a step up from the last".

=== '98 ===
Stephen Poole of GameSpot gave Front Page Sports: Baseball Pro '98 an 8 out of 10, commenting that "But just as with Sierra's Football Pro games, arcade-style play is not this game's strong point. The graphics, at least from the batter-pitcher perspective, are certainly decent - until you notice there's no option for a pitcher-batter perspective, and that, with the exception of skin tone, all the players are generic in the way they look, the way they step up to the plate, and the way they swing. On the up side, you do have a nice variety of managerial options available in the hands-on mode, as well as extensive control over pitching (type, location, speed) and batting (type of swing and area to look for the pitch). The game looks and feels a lot like real baseball - the animations are dead-on without looking canned and the ball physics seem to be about right."

== PB.INI file ==
The pb.ini file is a standard windows configuration file. Each section affects game play. Some physical factors cannot be altered in a ridiculous way however. For example, there is a section to alter pitch breaks, but you cannot create a "bugs bunny" change up or an unrealistic curveball. But the file can be tweaked it so that a pitcher could throw 200 mph or cause a batter to hit the ball 1000 feet. Turf resistance and bounce can be altered; as well as the effect that altitude and temperature has on gameplay. How a pitcher would pitch was based on the count, and game situation. All of the player related factors in the pb.ini file use the player's ratings or a percentage of them based on the corresponding entry in the pb.ini file. Most factors have a base number, then a percentage of the player's rating was added to this base. Here is how bat speed is calculated.

swingspeedbase=70

swingspeedPHpct=30

This means that the bat speed for a player with a 0 PH rating would be 70 mph, a player with a 99 PH would have a 99.7 mph swing (99/30). This method also applies to pitch identification, run speed, catch chance, and so on.

This file gives the game ultimate control. However it was not until recent years that some of the file's effect on the game was clearly understood. Some entries are still not understood completely. Most were learned through trial and error.
