= Arctic Fox (disambiguation) =

Arctic fox (Vulpes lagopus) is an animal native to Arctic regions.

Arctic Fox may also refer to:

- Arcticfox, a first person action computer game
- Operation Arctic Fox, a joint Finnish-German offensive during World War II
- Arctic Fox, a web browser forked from Pale Moon
