= Take a Break! Pinball =

1993 video game

- Developer: Dynamix
- Publisher: Sierra On-Line
- Platform: Microsoft Windows
- Release: 1993
- Genre: Pinball
- Modes: Single-player, multiplayer

Take a Break! Pinball is a 1993 pinball computer game collection by Dynamix/Sierra On-Line. It contained several individual boards based on various Dynamix or Sierra series such as King's Quest, Space Quest, The Adventures of Willy Beamish, Leisure Suit Larry, and Nova 9: The Return of Gir Draxon. It is the second game in the Take a Break! series of casual Windows games. It was designed for Windows 3.x.

== Tables ==
All tables are based on Synamix/Sierra IP including Kings Quest, Stellar 7, Willy Beamish and Space Quest.

=== Quest for Daventry ===
This table is based on King's Quest V. The game follows the narrative of the adventure game with objectives based on locations and encounters from that game. As objectives are completed on the board, new locations are opened up on the map. On this table, there was a bug that made the ball invisible after entering the Endless Desert Temple Stone Wall Trap. This was later patched with an updated DLL file.

=== Planet Pinball ===
Three tables are based on Space Quest IV.

=== Larry's Big Score ===
A single table is based on Leisure Suit Larry 5. It was later released as a stand-alone game in the early Leisure Suit Larry collections.

=== Flipped Out Willy ===
This table is based on The Adventures of Willy Beamish.

=== Draxon ===
Two tables based on Nova 9.

== Development ==
The game uses over 1,000 animations, and 1.5MB of digitized speech and sound effects.

A pre-release version was shown at CES in 1993.

== Reception ==
Reception

Review scores
Publication	Score
Com Club	11/20
Game Players PC Entertainment	2/5
PC Player	61%
PC Review	4/10

Computer Gaming World in 1993 liked Take a Break! Pinball's adventure game-like boards, but criticized the high CPU requirements, stating that performance "can be so bad as to be unplayable on a 386, and irritating on a 486".

PC Review criticized the game, which ran in a small window that couldn't be resized. The music was described as "not bad", but bearing little resemblance to that used on a real pinball machine. The manual was criticized for lacking important installation information.

PC Player praised the table designs and the overall presentation. The animations playing in the window on the right were called a distraction, and only of use to spectators. The jerky movement of the ball was criticized, making the game worse than it could have been.

Game Players PC Entertainment criticized several aspects of the game, and noted that when using the mouse to control the flippers it was easy to pause the game by mistake.

Com Club found the game to run unpleasantly slow on a 486 PC with sluggish movement of the ball ruining the game; using a Pentium based PC it was playable. The table designs and sound were praised.

Interactive Entertainment CD-ROM magazine criticized the colorful graphics on the some tables, saying that they made it "nearly impossible to keep your eye on the ball". They said that "taken as a serious pinball simulation, it falls short in more than one area".

== See also ==
- King's Quest V: Absence Makes the Heart Go Yonder!
- Space Quest IV: Roger Wilco and the Time Rippers
- Leisure Suit Larry 5: Passionate Patti Does a Little Undercover Work
- The Adventures of Willy Beamish
- Nova 9: The Return of Gir Draxon
