= 3-D Ultra Pinball: Creep Night =

1996 video game

- North American Windows box art
- Developer: Dynamix
- Publisher: Sierra On-Line
- Series: 3-D Ultra Pinball
- Platforms: Windows, Mac OS
- Release: 1996
- Genre: Pinball
- Mode: Single-player

3-D Ultra Pinball: Creep Night is a 1996 pinball video game for Microsoft Windows and Mac OS, and the second game in 3-D Ultra Pinball series.

== Gameplay ==
3-D Ultra Pinball: Creep Night is a game in which players use the flippers and pinballs to defend against monsters by using the Castle, Tower, and Dungeon as settings for each table.

== Reception ==
Reception

Review scores
Publication	Score
Computer Gaming World	4/5
GameRevolution	7/10
Génération 4	4/5
Joystick	80% (PC); 60% (Mac)
PC Games (DE)	68%
Gamezilla	88%

Charlotte Panther reviewed the game for Computer Gaming World, recommended it for beginning and experienced players, and stated that "Creep Night is an entertaining game with plenty of scope for replayability."

3-D Ultra Pinball: Creep Night received a score of 3 out of 5 from MacUser.

Robert Edvardsson from Mac Game Gate praised the sound effects, music, and graphics, calling it "one of the finest pinball simulators available for the Mac."

The reviewer from PC Multimedia & Entertainment rated the game 88% and said that "Creepnight offers the right balance of excellent sights and sounds, with non-stop addictively compelling gameplay!"

Monica Stoscheck for German magazine PC Player gave the game 4 stars, while German magazine PC Joker rated the game 74%, and Czech magazine Score only rated it 3 out of 10.

Chuck Miller from Gamecenter said that "A belfry of configurable preferences, multiple skill-level adjustments, and a brood of toggleable detail options make Creep Night one of the most adaptable pinball games to scare up attention."
