= Damon Slye =

American video game designer

Damon Slye (born June 15, 1962) is an American video game designer, director, and programmer. In 1984, he founded Dynamix with Jeff Tunnell in Eugene, Oregon. He is best known for creating the historic flight simulations Red Baron, A-10 Tank Killer, and Aces of the Pacific.

Slye's first product was Stellar 7, an action game for the Apple II which used 3D wireframe graphics. He followed it up with Arcticfox, the first original title Electronic Arts published for the new Amiga computer.

In 1994, Slye left Dynamix and the game industry, saying that he wanted a "sabbatical" to study math and physics as well as "playing chess, and skiing, and playing basketball, and doing a lot of reading", but expected to be "building products again" in a year. He founded Mad Otter Games in 2007.

== Games ==
- Stellar 7 (1982), Penguin Software
- Arcticfox (1986), Electronic Arts
- Skyfox II (1987), Electronic Arts
- Abrams Battle Tank (1988), Electronic Arts
- Project Firestart (1989), Electronic Arts
- MechWarrior (1989), Activision
- Deathtrack (1989), Activision
- David Wolf: Secret Agent (1989), Dynamix
- A-10 Tank Killer (1989), Dynamix
- Stellar 7 (1990), Dynamix
- Red Baron (1990), Dynamix
- Red Baron: Mission Builder (1992), Dynamix
- Aces of the Pacific (1992), Dynamix
- Aces of the Pacific, Expansion Disk, WWII:1946 (1992), Dynamix
- Aces Over Europe (1993), Dynamix
- Ace of Aces (2008), Instant Action
- Villagers and Heroes (2011), Mad Otter Games
