= David Wolf: Secret Agent =

1989 video game

- Developer: Dynamix
- Publisher: Dynamix
- Designers: Kevin Ryan; Damon Slye
- Artists: John Burton; Tom Collie; Kobi Miller; Brian Hahn; Mark Brenneman; Cyrus Kanga
- Composers: Bryce Morcello; Alan McKean
- Platform: MS-DOS
- Release: 1989
- Mode: Single-player

David Wolf: Secret Agent is an interactive movie published by Dynamix in 1989 for MS-DOS.

Several action scenes allow the player to attempt to perform various feats for David Wolf, such as flying a hang glider while shooting down enemies, racing down a highway while dueling with enemy cars and helicopters, or landing on an enemy parachutist or landing on top of a moving truck.

== Plot ==
The protagonist is David Wolf, a secret agent serving an intelligence agency named Peregrine. The Viper criminal organization has stolen a SF-2a "Shadowcat" stealth fighter and kidnapped its chief designer, Dr. Kelly O'Neill, intending to target Washington, D.C. with a nuclear bomb.

The first lead is a Monte Carlo casino where O'Neill was spotted with Garth Stock, a pilot who recently defected to Viper. During a failed attempt to rescue O'Neill, David Wolf learns that the Stealth is to be launched from Drax Island, west of Cyprus, and after a long car chase, he escapes by a means of a submarine. On his way to Drax, David Wolf is set up by Stock who rigged his plane, but Wolf escapes by stealing his parachute and lands on a truck driving to the Viper airport base.

Wolf discreetly attempts to reclaim the plane and there he sees O'Neill having escaped. Together they operate the plane against Viper and deliver it to USS Nimitz.

== Gameplay ==
David Wolf: Secret Agent is a cinematic game that features digitized 3-D graphics. Players are unable to select or influence the dialogue choices for the characters, nor choose actions for David Wolf to complete. The players is only able to use the keyboard or joystick in six areas of the game. The player uses a VCR interface to select options including the difficulty level for action sequences, the speed of text for the characters, and the detail of the 3d engine. The player can also use this interface to jump directly to any of the arcade scenes.

== Reception ==
Charles Ardai of Computer Gaming World stated that the game had too few action sequences, and that the initially witty dialogue became inane and unintentionally funny. While approving of the quality of the "visually stunning" digitized footage, he concluded that the game would not be worth playing more than once. The game was reviewed in 1990 in Dragon #154 by Hartley, Patricia, and Kirk Lesser in "The Role of Computers" column. The reviewers gave the game 3 out of 5 stars.

Computer Gaming World included the game in its list of Worst Games of All Time, and Worst Back Story of All Time.

== See also ==
- Operation Stealth, contemporaneous game involving a secret agent and a stolen Stealth fighter
