= 3-D Ultra Pinball (video game) =

1995 video game

- North American Mac OS box art
- Developer: Dynamix
- Publisher: Sierra On-Line
- Series: 3-D Ultra Pinball
- Platforms: Windows, Mac OS
- Release: October 25, 1995
- Genre: Pinball
- Mode: Single-player

3-D Ultra Pinball is a 1995 pinball video game for personal computers and the first in the 3-D Ultra Pinball video game series, published by Sierra On-Line.

== Gameplay ==
This game is based on the space simulation game Outpost. There are three tables named "Colony", "Command Post", and "Mine". Each table holds a set of five challenges. Smaller "mini-tables" are featured with their own set of flippers. The goal is to build and launch a starship, completing the game's entire course.

== Development ==
A port on the Sega Saturn was planned, but it was cancelled for unknown reasons.

== Reception ==
Reception

Review scores
Publication	Score
MacUser	3.5/5
Next Generation	2/5
PC Gamer	86%

Reviewing the Macintosh version, a Next Generation critic commented that "there is some substance to the argument that pinball is not a game meant for the monitor, but 3-D Ultra Pinball works, and it works very well". He particularly praised the fact that the graphics and physics both include elements not possible on a real pinball table, while remaining "true to the pinball spirit". Despite this, he gave it only two out of five stars. It received a score of 3.5 out of 5 from MacUser.

CNET said "For pinball players who like the idea of computer razzamatazz to enliven the game and suggest new playing possibilities, 3-D Ultra Pinball is a great twist on an old classic"

According to market research firm PC Data, 3-D Ultra Pinball was the 18th-best-selling computer game in the United States for the year 1996. According to Sierra On-Line, its sales surpassed 250,000 copies by the end of March 1996.
