= Project Firestart =

1989 video game

- Developer: Dynamix
- Publisher: Electronic Arts
- Designers: Jeff Tunnell; Damon Slye
- Programmers: Dariusz Łukaszuk; Paul Bowman; Richard Rayl
- Artists: John Burton; Dariusz Łukaszuk
- Composer: Alan McKean
- Platform: Commodore 64
- Release: 1989
- Genre: Survival horror
- Mode: Single-player

Project Firestart is a cinematic survival horror game for the Commodore 64 computer system. It was designed by Jeff Tunnell and Damon Slye and published by Electronic Arts in 1989. Taking place in the 21st century, the game follows a government agent dispatched to a space research station to learn why the scientists there abruptly cut off communication with Earth.

Well received upon its release, the game is regarded as one of the earliest survival horror games. It pioneered many conventions of the genre including limited ammunition, an emphasis on escaping enemies and puzzle solving over combat, solving a central mystery, and multiple endings.

== Plot ==
In 2061, agent Jon Hawking of the United System States is sent to the research ship Prometheus, in orbit around the Saturn moon Titan. Hawking's mission is to make contact with the members of Project Firestart, an initiative of the System Science Foundation, who have recently dropped out of communication with their superiors on Earth. Hawking is further instructed to retrieve all of the scientific data on board the Prometheus and then to destroy the ship, based on the USS' belief that Project Firestart has been compromised and could potentially pose a threat to Earth. Should Hawking fail in his mission, the USS will remotely activate the Prometheus' self-destruct sequence on the assumption that Hawking himself has been killed.

On board the Prometheus, Hawking discovers the entire crew brutally killed and the ship infested with large, hostile creatures. Retrieving the ship's science logs, Hawking discovers that Project Firestart was a genetic engineering program that sought to create a mining species resistant to extreme cold and low oxygen levels by combining the DNA of oxen with a new species of fungi discovered in asteroids around Titan. Hawking further learns that one of the scientists on the project, Dr. Arno, secretly altered the DNA of the mining creatures in an attempt to create a species of super soldiers. The plan backfired, as Arno's creations proved to be mindlessly hostile and capable of asexual reproduction. Unable to contain the monsters, the crew of the Prometheus was slaughtered. SSF Agent Annar Kensan, who was working in secret with Dr. Arno, survived by placing himself in cryosleep; upon Hawking's arrival on the Prometheus, he awakens. Also in cryosleep is Mary, another Firestart scientist, who survived the massacre because she was placed in suspended animation after suffering a minor injury.

The creatures spawn a giant, white version of themselves, which begins attacking them. The monster seeks out Hawking, who discovers that it is completely invulnerable to all of his weaponry. Using the Firestart scientists' notes on the genetic flaws in their original organisms, he must improvise a way to kill the creature using the resources available to him on board the ship.

=== Endings ===
The ending of the game varies depending on different actions taken by the player:

1. If the player rescues Mary and escapes the ship with the science logs, Hawking is attacked on board the escape shuttle by Kensan, who does not want knowledge of the experiments to leak out. By firing their weapon at the right time, the player can shoot and kill Kensan; on board the rescue craft, Hawking is reunited with Mary.
2. If the player does not rescue Mary but escapes with the science logs, Hawking is still attacked by Kensan. The player can still kill him, and be brought on board the rescue craft.
3. Failing to fire at the right time will result in Kensan overpowering Hawking and killing him. The Prometheus is destroyed, but Kensan escapes with Dr. Arno's research notes to continue the project.
4. Leaving without the science logs results in Hawking's superiors chastising him as a coward and a failure.
5. Escaping on the shuttle without sending an SOS distress call or informing HQ of the destruction results in the craft drifting through space. The shuttle is never picked up and the player dies when the oxygen runs out.
6. Dying on board the Prometheus results in the creatures overrunning the ship, multiplying uncontrollably. The USS remote detonates the station, destroying it and the creatures.

== Gameplay ==
The game is a side-scrolling, pseudo-3D action-adventure game. The player's character can run left or right through environments, shooting enemies with his laser gun and entering doors. The game adopted a cabinet projection for giving the action greater depth, and some areas allowed for movement into and out of the background. The HUD and on-screen information is very limited, just showing the health of the main character and the amount of ammo available.

Some of the terminals throughout the space station contain logs and journals of the personnel, which provide a history of the genetic project and thus the backstory - a revolutionary feature in 1989, which has become very common in modern video games. Occasionally, due to a player action or at fixed points in the game, the game would pause for a cutscene featuring either the hero or the monsters.

== Reception ==
Project Firestart was generally well received by the press in 1989. Zzap!64 rated the game 91%, with the following comment: "Project Firestart is jam-packed with the sort of fast-paced, polished presentation and chilling atmosphere which make software epics". German magazine Power Play, rated the game 78/100, saying it was "characterized by an incredibly dense atmosphere", but at the same time criticizing its use of a disk-exchange system, which requires the player to swap the disks many times mid-game. Computer Gaming World noted the game succeeds outside the traditional mold of action or adventure games and said, "While the game may fail to satisfy devout action gamers because the pacing of the action is slow or doctrinaire role-players because of the lack of true interaction and character development, it is a suspenseful blend of music, graphics, decision-making, action, clues, plot, and even, romance."

== Legacy ==
IGN has called it the first "fully formed vision of survival horror as we know it today", citing its balance of action and adventure, limited ammunition, weak weaponry, vulnerable main character, feeling of isolation, storytelling through journals, graphic violence, open exploration, cut-scenes, multiple endings and use of dynamically triggered music—all of which were characteristic elements of later games in the survival horror genre. Penny Arcade has similarly described it as "the Survival Horror template in its entirety".
