= Outpost 2: Divided Destiny =

1997 video game

- Developer: Dynamix
- Publisher: Sierra On-Line
- Director: Patrick Cook
- Designers: Allen McPheeters; Patrick Cook
- Platform: Windows
- Release: August 18, 1997
- Genre: Real-time strategy
- Modes: Single player, Multiplayer

Outpost 2: Divided Destiny is a real-time strategy computer game developed by Dynamix, released in 1997 by Sierra Entertainment. It reuses and refines some of the concepts from the original Outpost, but there is no direct continuity between the storylines or the gameplay.

== Storyline ==
The plot is revealed through a combination of the game's mission briefings and a novella which was written by J. Steven York and included with the game. The novella follows two characters: Axen Moon of Eden, and Emma Burke of Plymouth, who were childhood friends and lovers.

=== Main plot ===
A massive asteroid called "Vulcan's Hammer" causes an extinction event on Earth. A handful of engineers and scientists escape in the starship Conestoga. The ship travels in interstellar space with the passengers in stasis. After many centuries, the ship's onboard supplies begin to run out and its A.I. is forced to awaken the captain and some colonists. They give orders to touch down on the most habitable planet in range, though it is still quite harsh to human life. They name it New Terra and establish the colony of Eden. After many years orbiting New Terra, the Conestoga eventually crashes due to orbital decay.

Some years after the landing, disagreement over the colony's direction sparks division among its members. The main Eden faction wants to pursue terraforming, while separatists believe that humanity should adapt to live in the planet's natural environment. The ruling council decides in favor of terraforming. Subsequently, members of the separatist group steal materials and transports in order to form their own splinter colony, Plymouth. Using the sole communications satellite, the two colonies continue the debate remotely. Eventually, Eden announces that they have begun terraforming the planet. In response, the leaders of Plymouth sever relations with Eden by shutting down the communications satellite with the deactivation code. Shortly afterwards it's discovered that no one has the reactivation code, meaning the satellite is offline permanently. This shuts down any direct dialog between the two factions though it is shown in the novella that communication via other routes takes place during specific events.

Eden's terraforming process uses a bioagent that breaks apart oxygen bonds, carrying the potential to also destroy 'boptronic' (bio-optronic) computer systems and humans by breaking down their organic molecules. At first Eden performs a number of tests with early versions of the bioagent in testwells aligned with a fault line leading almost all the way up to Plymouth's colony. "The Blight", the uncontrolled expansion of the bioagent, is unleashed upon New Terra when one of their advanced labs explodes. Eden has to evacuate to run from the, at first, mostly unknown cause of the disaster. The water produced by the breaking of oxygen bonds lubricates dormant fault lines, and the air released begins to thicken and storm. These result in more frequent occurrences of earthquakes, lightning storms, and other natural disasters. In Plymouth, a dormant volcano erupts nearby, also forcing them to leave the area. To top off the disasters, the planet does not have enough atmosphere to burn off asteroids as it passes through an asteroid belt. Both factions soon come to the conclusion that The Blight will quickly engulf the entire planet, extinguishing all life. They decide to evacuate New Terra, but as they discover there are not enough resources left on the planet for two spaceships, confrontation is inevitable.

=== Ingame ===
The ingame storyline branches off as there are numerous differences depending on whether Eden or Plymouth is chosen to play. Certain events have another outcome, occur differently or not at all. In the novella, developments in the story are different between the viewpoints of the two characters. These differences are not limited to the broad happenings of the game but can occur as changes to the storyline of which only a reading player is aware. Besides these inconsistencies the information given in each side of the story is usually true for the other side. Some things are often omitted from one perspective which causes insights in one side of the story to be obtained only after reading the other. Most of the storytelling in the novella also explains and adds to most of the games' briefings where the player is usually kept in the dark. Thus, a player who hasn't read the novella has only a small amount of knowledge of what is happening behind the scenes and what the motives and causes are for mission objectives.

Both storylines feature frequent colony relocations to stay ahead of The Blight and other natural disasters, which serves as a plot device to make the player "start again" for each mission. The overall objective of both storylines is to gather sufficient research and resources to build a new starship and evacuate the planet. Subplots and events common to both sides include the takeover of Eden by a totalitarian, eugenics obsessed regime, a race to salvage data and components from the original starship, the fight for possession of the Gene Banks, and the revelation that the bio-electronic Savant sentient computers relied on by both sides are absorbed intact in to the Blight and replicate, making the Blight-conquered New Terra a paradise for them. At the culmination of both storylines the Savants and main characters of both sides discard political concerns and secretly cooperate to finish the starship design, exceeding specification and allowing the children of the other colony to be evacuated with the winning side.

=== New Terra ===
New Terra is like Mars: cold, dry, and nearly airless, though with enough resources to allow a decent human colony to be established. No technical data is given about it, like the size, age, or average distance from its parent star. However, there are some hints about it through the game, the Novella, and the help manual.

New Terra's solar system has an asteroid belt, as said both in the game and in the manual. Also, the games hint at one point that there is at least one gas giant planet in the star system. As shown in the title screen, New Terra has a small spherical grey moon that has yet to be named. New Terra's geography is made mostly of an orange sand and rock, although there are some other kinds of terrain. Since New Terra had past volcanism, it has also lava basins and has a non-native plant lifeform, part of an old failed terraforming experiment of Eden. New Terra's poles contained frozen water like Mars, and the sand may be mostly oxidized iron.

The planet has been hit by many meteors and is mostly homogenized in the metal department. This makes seams of mineable resources much rarer than on Earth. These seams are roughly even mixes of metals though, just thicker than the natural crust. They are defined by "Common Metals", light elements like iron, aluminum, silicon, and others from the upper half of the table and Rare Metals such as gold, lead, copper, zinc, mercury, cobalt, and other heavy elements. There are references that lead to the conclusion that there are many semi-precious and precious gemstones included in their mining.

== Gameplay ==
Unlike traditional real-time strategy games, Outpost 2 emphasizes colony management over the destruction of enemies. The game can be played in one of three modes: Campaign, Colony, or Multiplayer. In each mode the player can select either the Eden or the Plymouth colony. Eden's research is more advanced and their military is oriented towards brute force, while Plymouth's morale is more stable and their military is oriented towards speed and trickery. Most units and buildings on each side share the same function while having a unique set of game sprites. In addition, each faction also has units and buildings that are exclusive to that side or have slight alterations to the equivalent on the other side.

Morale is a critical factor for the colony, and because it can fluctuate rapidly, much of the player's attention is spent on ensuring that it remains at optimal levels. Low morale often results in decreased efficiency and worker shortages, which in turn can cause buildings to shut down. Extended periods of low morale can lead to colony stagnation and recession. Morale is improved by maintaining a healthy surplus of basic necessities and efficient worker distribution, while it is decreased by food shortages, disasters, and overcrowding.

Combat units can be built according to the player's specifications. There are three generic chassis, each of which can be equipped with one of eleven different weapon turrets; half of these are available to each faction. There are also miniature robots available to Plymouth that have several useful roles in combat. The technology for each chassis and weapon type must first be researched before it becomes available as an option.

Research happens in three specific buildings. The Basic Lab is only encountered in the campaign to rebuild the databases lost during the evacuation. Next is the Standard Lab which mostly features research enabling new buildings as well as upgrades to buildings, units and the colony. Finally, the Advanced lab allows research on further advantages for your colony, most of the weapons program and a space program to build your spaceship.

=== Game modes ===
In a Campaign game, the player can play through 24 scripted missions, 12 for each colony. These missions challenge the player to maintain population levels, collect resources, construct kits and vehicles, and perform research, all within a strict time limit, to keep moving the colony away from either the advancing blight or lava flows. If the player fails to make these preparations on time, the blight and/or lava flows will engulf the colony and destroy it. The exact requirements vary between missions and difficulty levels. If enemies are present, the player must also allocate resources to defense, adding to the overall challenge. Later on, relating to the storyline, other missions or objectives must be accomplished such as salvaging parts of the original Conestoga to rescuing scientists and stealing the Genebank from the other faction.

In a Colony game, the player plays a single long-term scenario with broad objectives, and usually no time limit. Four scenarios are included in the game, with a 5th having been released later on. Fan-created colony games can also be downloaded from various locations on the internet.

In a Multiplayer game, two to six human players play against each other, either in a straightforward military confrontation, a race towards a predefined objective, or a race to accumulate resources within a time limit. Multiplayer games can be played over a local area network or the Internet; however, since the Sierra Internet Gaming System (SIGS) stopped supporting online play for Outpost 2, the most common avenue of playing online is through virtual networks such as Hamachi.
