= Heart of China =

1991 video game

- Developer: Dynamix
- Publisher: Sierra On-Line
- Director: Jeff Tunnell
- Designer: Jeff Tunnell
- Programmer: Louie McCrady
- Artist: D. Brent Burkett
- Writers: David Atman; Jeffrey Tunnell; Tom Brooke; David Selle
- Composers: Don Latarski; Christopher Stevens
- Platforms: Amiga, MS-DOS, Classic Mac OS
- Release: 1991
- Genre: Adventure
- Mode: Single-player

Heart of China is a point-and-click adventure game developed by Dynamix and published by Sierra On-Line in 1991. The game follows the exploits of pilot Jake "Lucky" Masters as he tries to rescue nurse Kate Lomax from a ruthless Chinese warlord.

== Plot ==
In 1930s Hong Kong, struggling former World War I fighter pilot Jake "Lucky" Masters is recruited by rich businessman E.A. Lomax for a dangerous mission. Lomax's daughter Kate has been kidnapped by ruthless warlord Li Deng and imprisoned in Deng's Chengdu fortress. Lucky must rescue Kate, but to do so he must enlist the help of a mysterious ninja named Zhao Chi. Each day Lucky has not rescued Kate, his reward money decreases by $20,000.

After sneaking into Deng's fortress, Lucky and Chi snatch Kate and escape. Unfortunately, Kate is bitten by a snake during the rescue and the only medicine that can save her is in Kathmandu in Nepal. After further adventures in Istanbul, the trio makes its way to Paris. The game features multiple endings, with the player's actions determining which one is seen.

== Gameplay ==
The primary gameplay is done via a point and click interface where players can use the mouse, keyboard, and/or joystick to interact with the game environment, converse with NPCs, and solve puzzles to progress the game. Portions of the game can be played from Jake's, Chi's, or Kate's perspectives, and some segments require specific characters to properly complete. There are two optional arcade-style action sequences: One where the player drives a tank through the plains of Chengdu, and another where the player has a swordfight atop the Orient Express.

Certain choices can delay the team (diminishing the reward given in the epilogue). There are several possible endings to the game and many ways to die or otherwise fail.

== Development ==
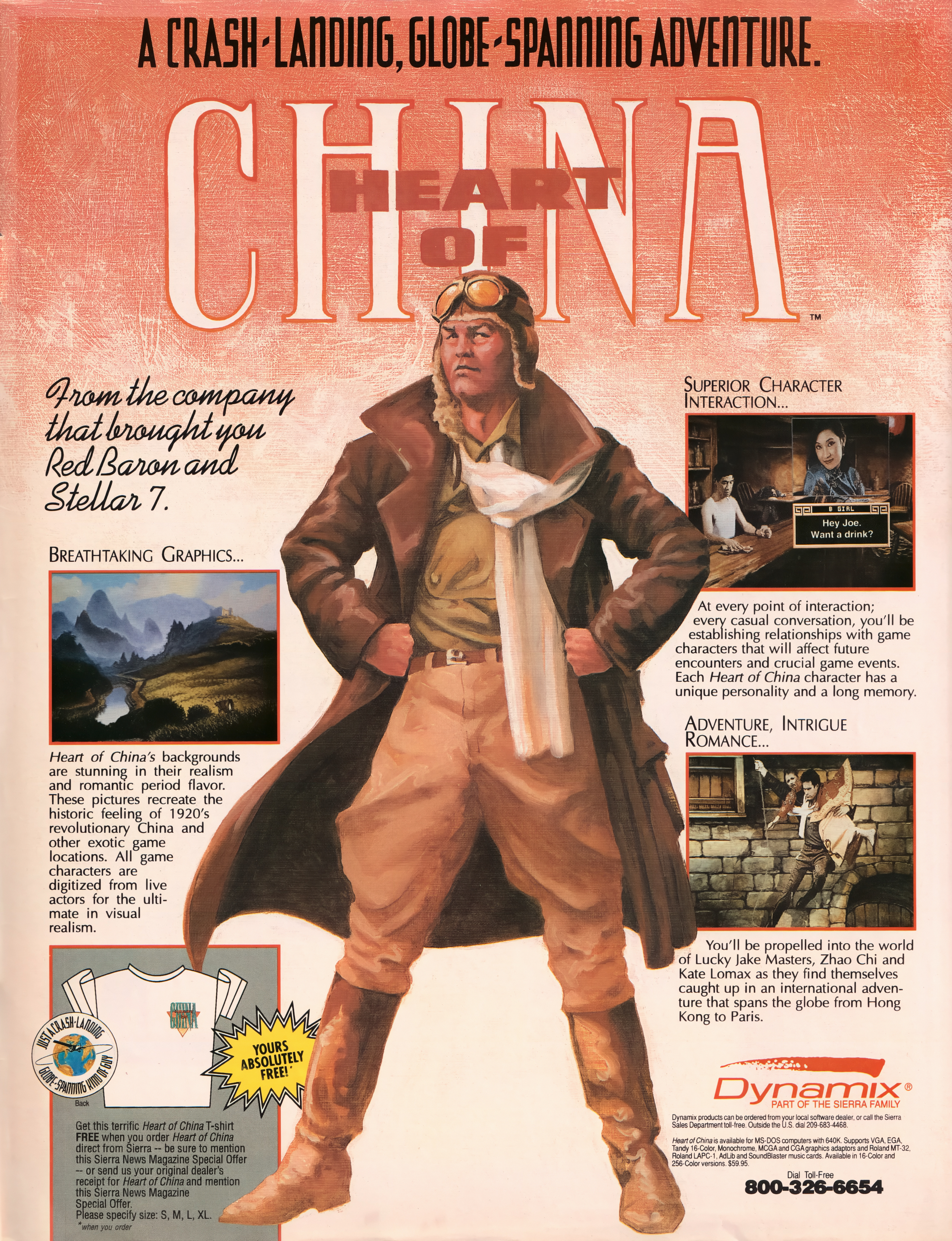
Heart of China magazine ad.

The game was developed on the proprietary Dynamix Game Development System that was first used in Rise of the Dragon. In regards to Heart of China's point-and-click adventure UI, Dynamix president Jeff Tunnell stated that "With our 'point-and-click' interaction system, our goal was to eliminate the frustration factor from adventure gaming, so that nothing interferes with the experience of the game." The artwork used a mixture of digitized photos of live actors and hand painted sets. The game supported VGA resolution in 256 colors. Because of tight production budgets, Dynamix had to recruit the cast of actors from the company's own employees and even their families.

== Reception ==
Reception

Review scores
| Publication | Score |
|---|---|
| Dragon | 5/5 (MS-DOS) |
| ACE | 910/1000 (Amiga) |

Heart of China was commercially successful.

ACE gave the game 910 out of 1000 points, calling it "a significant breakthrough in the interactive storytelling genre" and stating that unlike contemporary games such as Rise of the Dragon and Space Quest IV it does not just have excellent graphics and sound, but also a proper narrative storyline. The reviewer also mentions the story's similarity to that of the Tom Selleck film High Road to China. Computer Gaming World stated that "Heart of China is everything a good adventure movie should be: fast-paced, tense, ingenious, witty, varied of locale and light of plot. Above all, it is entertaining". The magazine praised the graphics, music, and story, and concluded that it was "a cinematic experience to be savored". In Dragon, the game got 5 out of 5 stars.

British gaming magazine The One reviewed the DOS version of Heart of China in 1991, stating that "Now that Dynamix has combined full-colour paintings, live actors and digitising to achieve the stunning look of Heart of China, the 'interactive movie' seems just that little bit closer."

In 1991, PC Format declared Heart of China one of the 50 best computer games ever. The editors wrote, "Stunning digitised scenes are the stars and create a tremendous atmospheric experience that has a tough adventure in there as well."
