= Suzuki's RM 250 Motocross =

1989 video game

- Developer: Dynamix
- Publisher: Gamestar
- Designer: Jeff Tunnell
- Platform: MS-DOS
- Release: 1989
- Genre: Racing
- Mode: Single-player

Suzuki's RM 250 Motocross (also known as just Motocross) is an MS-DOS racing game developed by Dynamix in 1989. The races are exclusively on man-made stadium supercross tracks.

== Gameplay ==
The game consists of a race season of 10 races, with the option to practice outside of the season mode. Before starting the race, the player can adjust parts of their bike, such as tire pressure, gear ratios, suspension, and more. The race itself contains varying jumps, light or sharp turns, loose dirt, and actual damage to your bike that could eventually knock you out from finishing.
