= Driver's Education '99 =

1998 video game

Driver’s Education ’99
- Developer: Dynamix
- Platform: Windows
- Release: October 1998
- Genre: Educational

Driver's Education ’99 is a 1998 video game developed by Dynamix.

== Gameplay ==
Driver's Education '99 is an interactive driving simulation aimed at teaching teens safe and responsible driving practices. The game offers over 70 detailed lessons tailored to the 1999 traffic regulations for all 50 states. Players navigate through a Virtual City—an immersive 3D environment replicating urban and rural landscapes—where vehicles behave unpredictably to simulate real driving conditions. Throughout gameplay, users receive feedback from "Driver Ed," an AI instructor that reinforces proper techniques and monitors the player's actions. Lessons cover critical topics including the effects of alcohol and drugs, road rage prevention, and defensive driving strategies. Modules include content from organizations like MADD, AAA Foundation for Traffic Safety, and Motor Trend Magazine. These lessons emphasize the mechanics of driving, like tire wear and stopping distances, and offer simulations of impaired driving scenarios. Gameplay supports various control setups, including mouse steering, joysticks, and force feedback wheels.

== Development ==
The game was originally scheduled to release in September 1998. The game was adopted for Utah high schools statewide.

== Reception ==
Reception

Review score
Publication	Score
New York Daily News	3.5/4

Roy Bassave from New York Daily News gave the game a score of 3.5 out of 4 stating "But this program can ease jitters beginners have about getting on the highway - and it's great refresher for veteran drivers".
