= Trophy Bass =

1995 video game

- Developer: Dynamix
- Publisher: Sierra On-Line
- Series: Trophy Bass
- Platforms: Windows, Macintosh
- Release: 1995
- Genre: Fishing

Trophy Bass is a 1995 fishing video game developed by Dynamix and published by Sierra On-Line. It is the first game in the Trophy Bass franchise.

== Reception ==
Reception

Review scores
Publication	Score
Computer Gaming World	4/5
PC Gamer (US)	90%
Computer Game Review	84/78/75
PC Entertainment	B−

Combined sales of the game and its sequel, Trophy Bass 2, surpassed 500,000 units by November 1997. In the United States, Trophy Bass was the 10th best-selling computer game of 1997, with 356,280 units sold. The following year, it fell to 21st place, selling an additional 231,901 copies. Its revenue in 1998 alone was estimated at $2.42 million. The first two Trophy Bass games together topped 1.5 million units in sales by July 1999.

Ned Gaskins of PC Gamer US summarized it as "a great simulation, and a hell of a lot of fun." He wrote, "[W]hen you haul in your first 14-pound bass (they exist, really!), Trophy Bass proves to be as exhilarating as any shoot-'em-up. It's just an all-around good game, and one you'll spend hours at a stretch playing." In Computer Gaming World, Kevin Turner called it "a wonderfully entertaining game", and wrote that "anyone with a passing interest in fishing, or looking for an alternative sports game (besides golf) will love Trophy Bass."

Trophy Bass was a runner-up for Computer Gaming World's 1995 "Sports Game of the Year" award, which ultimately went to NBA Live 95. The editors wrote that Trophy Bass "rewards patient gamers with the best fishing simulation yet."
