= Front Page Sports: Baseball Pro '98 =

1997 sports video game

- Developer: Sierra On-Line
- Publisher: Sierra On-Line
- Series: Front Page Sports Baseball
- Platform: Microsoft Windows
- Release: NA: May 29, 1997; EU: 1997
- Genre: Sports video game
- Modes: Single player, multiplayer

Front Page Sports: Baseball Pro '98 is a baseball sports video game released for Microsoft Windows in 1997. It was developed and published by Sierra On-Line, and is part of the Front Page Sports Baseball series.

== Reception ==
Reception

Aggregate score
Aggregator	Score
GameRankings	80%

Review scores
Publication	Score
AllGame	4.5/5
CNET Gamecenter	8/10
Computer Games Strategy Plus	4/5
Computer Gaming World	2.5/5
Game Informer	7.25/10
GameSpot	8/10
PC Gamer (US)	60%

The game received favorable reviews according to the review aggregation website GameRankings.
