= Abrams Battle Tank =

1988 video game

- Developers: Dynamix; Realtime Games Software (Genesis)
- Publishers: Electronic Arts; Sega (Genesis)
- Designer: Damon Slye
- Programmer: David McClurg
- Artists: Kobi Miller; Cyrus Kanga
- Composer: Bryce Morcello
- Platforms: MS-DOS, Genesis
- Release: MS-DOS; 1988; Genesis; 1991
- Genre: Vehicle simulation
- Mode: Single-player

Abrams Battle Tank is a video game developed by Dynamix and published by Electronic Arts in 1988 for MS-DOS. Designed by Damon Slye, the game is a 3D vehicle simulation of the M1 Abrams tank. The 1991 Sega Genesis port by Realtime Games Software was renamed to M-1 Abrams Battle Tank.

== Gameplay ==
The simulation depicts the tank's four crew positions. The missions are arcade game-like with a fixed sequence of actions to perform.

== Ports ==
The first level

The port from MS-DOS to Genesis was performed by Realtime Games Software in the UK using their own 3D engine that was earlier used in Carrier Command with some tweaks to adapt it to the Genesis and the needs of the tank scenario.

== Reception ==
In 1989, Dragon gave the MS-DOS version of the game 3 out of 5 stars. Computer Gaming World gave the game two and a half stars out of five, stating that Abrams Battle Tank was a good game but a poor simulation. The magazine cited the commanding officer's briefings, at one point threatening failure with execution, as unprofessional and offensive to military personnel. In a 1994 survey of wargames the magazine gave the title two out of five stars, stating that newer games had superseded it and criticizing the simulation of a single tank instead of a company or squad. Compute! agreed that the game was not very realistic, but advised players to "accept the game as a graphically excellent, tactically complex simulation".

In 1994, PC Gamer US named Abrams Battle Tank the 50th best computer game ever.
