= Take a Break! Crosswords =

1992 video game

- Developers: Dynamix; Presage Software (Macintosh)
- Publisher: Sierra On-Line
- Platforms: Windows; Macintosh
- Release: 1992
- Genre: Puzzle

Take a Break! Crosswords is a 1992 puzzle video game developed by Dynamix and published by Sierra On-Line for Windows and Macintosh. The Macintosh version was developed by Presage Software.

== Gameplay ==
Take a Break! Crosswords players are challenged to a collection of 750 crossword puzzles drawn from Dell Magazine, each sortable by difficulty (Easy, Medium, Hard), size (ranging from 13x13 to 19x19), and author. The game offers a variety of play styles, including over twenty themed specialty puzzles—from holiday challenges to Star Trek tributes and punanagrams. Gameplay unfolds within a Windows-compatible interface that keeps the entire puzzle visible onscreen, eliminating the need for scrolling. Players can tailor their experience by selecting a proficiency level (Apprentice, Puzzler, or Fanatic), enabling or disabling auto-checking, and choosing whether to be scored against a time limit. Additional features include hints, a 65-page built-in crossword dictionary, automatic word advancement, and the ability to highlight intersecting clues. Digitized speech, sound effects, and animated graphics enhance the presentation, while puzzles can be printed for offline play.

== Reception ==
Reception

Review scores
Publication	Score
Computer Game Review	79%
Génération 4	72%

The Oregonian said "Developed by Eugene-based Dynamix, "Take a Break Crosswords" should be a popular gift option for the upcoming holiday season".

Compute! said "Although designed for breaks in the workday, Crosswords Deluxe is an ideal way to jump-start your brain on those particularly slow mornings. It's more natural than caffeine, but no less habit-forming".
