= 6180 the moon =

2013 video game

6180 The Moon
- Developers: Turtle Cream; PokPoong Games
- Publisher: Turtle Cream
- Composers: Seongyi Yi; Haeeun Kim
- Engine: Unity
- Platforms: OS X, Windows, New Nintendo 3DS, Linux, Wii U, Nintendo Switch, Xbox One
- Release: Windows: WW: March 9, 2013; OS X: WW: September 19, 2014; Linux: WW: November 24, 2014; Xbox One: NA/PAL: December 11, 2015; Wii U: NA/PAL: February 25, 2016; New Nintendo 3DS: JP: March 8, 2017; PAL: March 16, 2017; NA: June 29, 2017; Nintendo Switch: NA: May 24, 2018; EU: May 31, 2018
- Genre: Puzzle-platform
- Mode: Single-player

6180 the moon is a 2013 puzzle-platform game developed by Turtle Cream and Miara Sung. It was initially released for Microsoft Windows in March 2013 as part of an Indie Royale bundle. The game follows the story of the Moon searching for the Sun after it has gone missing, leaving the people of Earth to suffer in eternal night.

== Gameplay ==
Gameplay screenshot

The player controls the Moon, shown as a simple white circle. The Moon only has the ability to jump and move left and right, however, the tops and the bottom of the level boundaries loop, giving the player more options to tackle the platforming challenges the game presents. The goal of each level is to get from the starting point to the exit block. Every level is grouped into a certain "world" each of which is based on a planet (it also includes the Sun), with each world having a different thematic mechanic.

== Plot ==
The Moon prepares to set and allow the Sun to rise, however, the Moon notices the Sun is missing. The Moon then begins a journey to find the Sun, and tell him to come back to Earth. On the way, the Moon talks to each of the planets, who give their opinions or advice on the situation. At the end, the Sun tells the Moon that he never left, and the Moon begins the journey back.

== Development ==
6180 the moon was developed by Turtle Cream. The first alpha version of 6180 the moon took one hour and forty-three minutes (6180 seconds) to make, before adding in the story, or most of the other levels and worlds that appear in the finished game.

== Reception ==
6180 the moon was received positively. John Walker of Rock Paper Shotgun called it "a very pretty thing", and Spencer Hayes of Destructoid said "There is something about [puzzle platformers] that just doesn't click with me like they did before. Except for 6180 The Moon. That game is rad." TotalBiscuit said the game is "brilliant... Really impressive... A fantastic piece of work." Phil Spencer wrote "This game is on Steam tomorrow, worth getting it. #6180themoon, another one we need on xb1." 6180 the moon was selected for the Experimental Gameplay Workshop at the Game Developers Conference 2013, for the IndieCade 2013 showcase, and won Best Game at Tokyo Game Show 2014, among other honors.
