= Stellar 7: Draxon's Revenge =

1993 video game

- Developer: Dynamix
- Publisher: Dynamix
- Platform: 3DO
- Release: NA: 1993; JP: March 20, 1994
- Genre: First-person shooter
- Mode: Single-player

Stellar 7: Draxon's Revenge is a 1993 video game developed and published by Dynamix for the 3DO Interactive Multiplayer.

The game's introduction was read by actor Michael Dorn, who was famous at this time for playing a Klingon crewman Worf on the television series Star Trek: The Next Generation.

== Gameplay ==
In Stellar 7: Draxon's Revenge, players command the Raven, a futuristic super-tank gliding on an anti-gravity cushion, armed with lasers and upgradeable weapons. As Earth's last hope against the tyrannical overlord Gir Draxon and his Arcturan Empire, the player must traverse seven alien worlds, each filled with eerie landscapes and hostile forces. Gameplay involves navigating terrain, engaging in fast-paced combat with a variety of enemy craft—some invisible or unidentified—and collecting power-ups like super-cannons, cloaking shields, and RC bombs. Each world culminates in a showdown with a formidable Guardian boss. Defeating it unlocks a Warp Link to the next planet, with the final mission requiring the destruction of Draxon's flagship to save Earth. The game offers three difficulty levels: practice (limited to the first world), standard, and a punishing "masochist" mode. Controls are intuitive, with radar and energy indicators aiding survival.

== Plot ==
The player is the driver of a "super-tank" called Raven. Raven is armed with powerful weapons and an anti-gravity device that allows it to move fast. The player must defeat the evil hordes of Gir Draxon, overlord of the Arcturan Empire, who aims to enslave Earth and its inhabitants.

== Reception ==
Reception

Review scores
Publication	Score
Entertainment Weekly	C-
Edge	5/10
Famitsu	21/40
GamePro	4.625/5

GamePro was positive about the game, commending its gameplay and action.

Joe Blenkle from The Orangevale News praised the gameplay and the graphics.

Entertainment Weekly noted an impressive opening narration, music, and graphics, but found that the controls were hard to use when fighting aliens.
