= 3D Ultra Minigolf Adventures =

2006 video game

- Developer: Wanako Games
- Publisher: Vivendi Games (Note: Released under the Sierra Online brand)
- Series: 3D Ultra Minigolf
- Platforms: Windows, Xbox 360
- Release: Windows; December 20, 2006; Xbox 360; April 18, 2007
- Genre: Sports
- Modes: Single player, multiplayer

3D Ultra Minigolf Adventures is a 2006 arcade golf video game for Microsoft Windows and Xbox 360 developed by Wanako Games and published by Vivendi Games under the Sierra Online label. The game released on December 20, 2006, for Microsoft Windows, and April 18, 2007, for Xbox 360. It is part of the 3D Ultra Minigolf series.

== Gameplay ==
The game focuses on arcade elements rather than stick to a simulation way of miniature golf. While traditional stroke rules apply, there are power-ups to be found throughout each course, like making the player's ball jump, or the hole become a vacuum. The original release of the game comes with three courses and overall 36 holes, which are set within space, a carnival, and a Wild West. The courses have their own separate conditions and traps, like scorpions in the Wild West one. One of the features present is the course editor. It allows the player to customize all aspects of the course, including the ability to place hazards and power-ups in any location. There are two modes to play, either a single-player tournament or a multiplayer game both locally and online for 2-4 players.

One of the main features is the map editor. It allows the player to customize all aspects of the course (ramps, intersections, turns), including the ability to place hazards and power-ups in any location. Tournament mode offers a choice between four characters, along with 3 control styles: Hold and Release, 3-Click, and Analog Control.

== Development ==
Sierra Online announced the development of 3D Ultra Minigolf Adventures on September 27, 2006, saying that it would release on Xbox Live Arcade in the winter of the same year. On July 25, 2007, the Lost Island expansion pack was added for Xbox Live, introducing another eighteen-hole course.

== Reception ==
Reception

Aggregate score
Aggregator	Score
Metacritic	(X360) 66/100 (PC) 35/100

Review scores
Publication	Score
Eurogamer	5/10
GameSpot	5.5/10
IGN	7.5/10
Official Xbox Magazine (UK)	7/10
Official Xbox Magazine (US)	7/10
PALGN	7/10
TeamXbox	7/10
The New York Times	(average)

The Xbox 360 version received "average" reviews, while the PC version received "unfavorable" reviews, according to the review aggregation website Metacritic.

Eurogamer said, "it's adequate amusement for the price, but still falls short of the gut-busting potential presented by online crazy golf". IGN praised the multiplayer modes and graphics, while also adding that "3D Ultra Mini Golf Adventures is a fun multiplayer game". Aaron Thomas of GameSpot criticized the pace of how the game plays and physics, but liked the multiplayer mode and the course creator. Thomas said that "3D Ultra Minigolf Adventures is an unremarkable game that fails to capture the fun of real miniature golf".

Since its release, the Xbox 360 version sold 11,049 units worldwide by January 2011. Sales of the game moved up to 34,413 units by the end of 2011.

== Sequel ==
A sequel titled 3D Ultra Minigolf Adventures 2 was released in 2010.
