= 1993 Space Machine =

- Developer: Modesty
- Platforms: Windows, Mac
- Release: WW: March 28, 2016
- Genre: Shoot 'em up
- Modes: Single-player, multiplayer

1993 Space Machine is a shoot 'em up video game released for Windows and Mac in 2016. The game was originally planned for release as Shenandoah: Daughter of the Stars on the Amiga in 1993 before the project was abandoned.
