= 3-D Ultra Pinball =

Computer game series

- Genre: Pinball
- Developer: Dynamix
- Publisher: Sierra On-Line
- Platforms: Windows, Macintosh, Game Boy Color
- First release: 3-D Ultra Pinball (1995)
- Latest release: 3-D Ultra Pinball: Thrillride (2000)
- Spin-offs: 3-D Ultra Minigolf

3-D Ultra Pinball is a series of pinball computer games developed by Sierra Entertainment's Dynamix. The games try to escape from the traditional, arcade pinball and feature animation, more than one table at once, and "temporary targets" (such as spaceships, goblins and dinosaurs appearing throughout the table).

== 3-D Ultra Pinball ==
The original 3-D Ultra Pinball game was released in 1995. This game is based on the space simulation game, Outpost. There are three tables named Colony, Command Post, and Mine. Each table holds a set of five challenges. Smaller "mini-tables" are featured with their own set of flippers. The goal is to build and launch a Starship completing the game's entire course.

== 3-D Ultra Pinball: Creep Night ==
The second game, Creep Night (1996) had a horror film set, and 3 different tables (and after finishing all challenges in a table, the player could travel to the other ones):

- Castle, fragmented in town, castle area and graveyard. Its challenges are Zombies, Goblins, Runaway (a goblin riding an ATV runs through the table), Vortex (multi-ball, in which the player must shoot in the vortex) and Wraith (a female magnetic ghost tries to capture the ball).
- Tower, a mad scientist lab. The challenges are: Rat, Energy Gate (similar to Vortex, but "single-balled"), Beast, Goblin, and Dynamo. After finishing all 5 challenges, the "Frankenstein monster" revives and is needed to hit him 5 times.
- Dungeon. The Challenges are: Gobbler (a ghost chases the ball to eat it), Spiders, Dimension Door (if hit, activates a "Simon"-like game), Trapdoor (similar to "Vortex") and Skeleton Escape (six skeletons come out of the cells for you to hit). Like in Tower, after beating them a Catapult appears, and the player must have to hit it some times.

After finishing all the 3 tables, comes a changed Castle table, with 5 new challenges.

This was also released with several demos of other software titles also by Sierra Online.

3-D Ultra Pinball: Creep Night received a score of 3 out of 5 from MacUser.

== 3-D Ultra Pinball: The Lost Continent ==
Lost Continent (1997) had a Jurassic Park-like set. It followed a storyline, in which a plane falls on an island where an evil genius, Heckla, has created dinosaurs of other animals and the cavemen who live there. Professor Spector, his assistant Mary, and adventurer Rex Hunter try to escape back to the modern world, rescue tribal woman Neeka and stop Heckla and his army of robots.

It has no challenges but features 16 tables, divided in 3 "sectors": Jungle, Temple and Chambers (Heckla's Lab).

== 3-D Ultra NASCAR Pinball ==
As the title reads, it is a NASCAR-themed pinball, released in 1998.

The game only has 3 fields: garage, track and pitstop.

It features several famous NASCAR drivers like Dale Earnhardt and Bobby Labonte as playable characters, but the choice affects only audio commentaries and field decorations.

== 3-D Ultra Pinball Power ==
Power (1999) was a compilation released in 1999, featuring the first game, Creep Night and Lost Continent, and as a bonus, The Incredible Machine and a demo of 3-D Ultra Golf.

== 3-D Ultra Pinball: Thrillride ==
The final title of the series, Thrillride, also received a Game Boy Color version, which was developed by Left Field Productions and released by Sierra in December 2000. It is set in Hersheypark with rides and theme park elements as puzzles and table features. The PC version was included in Sierra's Game Room for the PC in 2004.

== Sales ==
The series sold more than half a million copies by 1998.

== See also ==
- 3D Ultra Minigolf
- 3D Ultra Lionel Traintown
