= 3D Railroad Master =

1998 video game

- Publisher: Abracadata
- Platform: Windows
- Release: September 30, 1998
- Genre: Vehicle simulation
- Mode: Single-player

3D Railroad Master, also known as Master 3D Railroad, is a 1998 vehicle simulation video game published by Abracadata for Windows operating systems.

== Gameplay ==
In 3D Railroad Master, players take on the role of a train engineer, tasked with managing up to four diesel locomotives across model-style track layouts. The gameplay centers on simulation rather than strategy: the player is responsible for controlling speed, direction, braking, and coupling or uncoupling cars as needed. Timing is critical—arriving too early or late at destinations costs points, while rushing risks derailments, damage, or accidents involving pedestrians and livestock. The missions unfold on maps imported from Abracadata's model railroad CAD software. Each mission comes with a mapped layout and hints in the manual, though players must print their own schedules if needed. After completing the 20 included missions, replayability hinges on tweaking existing schedules or investing in the companion design software to access new layouts.

== Development ==
The game was developed by Abracadata, a company based in Eugene, Oregon.

== Reception ==
Reception

Review scores
Publication	Score
Computer Gaming World	1.5/5
Computer Games Magazine	3/5
PC Player	6/10
PC Joker	47%
The Indianapolis Star	2.5/4

Computer Gaming World said "3D Railroad Master has an unfinished and bug-ridden feel. Nearly every menu has text disappearing, missing buttons, and misaligned entries. The layouts are loaded in two steps, and this can take anywhere from 30 seconds to more than a minute. The game’s problems might be tolerable if the program were in any way enjoyable"

Computer Games Magazine said "The game's greatest weakness may be its "legs"-once you've played through the 20 missions, that's pretty much it; you can adjust the schedules in missions to create new situations, but if you want all-new layouts you have to get 3D Railroad Concept and Design-and at nearly $100 retail on top of the $60 retail you may have already paid, that's an investment only a robber baron could appreciate"
