= 99 Spirits =

2012 video game

- Cover art, featuring the player character, Hanabusa, in the front.
- Developer: Toraiki
- Publishers: JP: Toraiki; WW: Fruitbat Factory
- Platform: Microsoft Windows
- Release: JP: July 2012; WW: May 31, 2013
- Genres: Puzzle, role-playing

99 Spirits (Japanese: 九十九神, Hepburn: Tsukumogami) is a puzzle role-playing video game developed and published in Japan by TORaIKI in July 2012 for Microsoft Windows. It was localized and published in English by Fruitbat Factory on May 31, 2013 after a successful crowdfunding campaign. Two pieces of downloadable content, featuring side-stories presented in a visual novel format, were released in 2014 and 2015.

The story takes place in medieval Japan, and focuses on Hanabusa, a girl who seeks to avenge her mother's death by fighting evil spirits. By using the gems embedded in her sword, she is able to find clues to the spirits' names; players need to correctly identify the spirits to be able to harm them. By acquiring more gems, players are given access to more abilities; one such gem allows players to capture spirits and use their abilities in battle and when solving puzzles.

Reception of the game has been varied, ranging from negative to highly positive, with reviewers generally appreciating the art, sound, presentation, and inventive gameplay, while criticizing the plot, level designs, and repetition.

== Gameplay ==
A battle against an enemy spirit. Players use their sword to get clues to enemies' identities, such as letters from their names.

99 Spirits is a turn-based puzzle role-playing video game in which players fight evil spirits known as Tsukumogami. In order to hurt an enemy spirit, players must first find out the enemy's identity. To do this, players need to charge the gems embedded in the player character's sword, which is done by attacking and defending; once the first gem in the sword is filled up, players get access to clues to the enemy's identity, in the form of words or letters from or relating to its name. For instance, the clues to a katana spirit's identity may be "KA", "blade", and "NA". Once the second gem is filled up, players are able to type what they think the enemy's name is; if they correctly identify the spirit, they are able to fight it, whereas if they guess incorrectly, the player character takes some damage and the gems need to be charged again.

Throughout the course of the game, players gain access to new gems, which grant players more abilities. Among the gems is one that gives players the ability to capture spirits instead of fighting them; once players have captured a spirit, they are able to use its abilities in combat. In addition to acquiring new gems, players are able to make previously acquired gems more powerful; for instance, a powered-up version of the first gem can give players access to more clues to enemies' identities.

Outside of battles, players are able to navigate a grid-based overworld map, in which they can solve puzzles by using captured spirits' abilities. Additionally, players can fight spirits and find items in the overworld map. Among the various items, there are some that replenish the player character's health, some that sate their hunger, and some that are used to mend the player character's sword.

== Plot ==
Players control a girl named Hanabusa (英), who lives in Heian-kyō in medieval Japan. Her mother gets killed by evil spirits, so she seeks to get revenge; on her way, she receives a sword that has been passed down from her mother, which allows her to see the spirits' true forms. After a spirit that claims to be her father destroys the sword, she has to mend it and find out the truth about her father.

== Development and release ==
The game was developed by the Japanese independent developer TORaIKI, and was originally released digitally in Japanese in July 2012, with a physical release in August 2012 at Comiket 82. It was later released in English by Fruitbat Factory on May 31, 2013 after an Indiegogo campaign.

After the release of the original game, two pieces of downloadable content were made available, featuring side-stories presented in a visual novel format. The first, Cage of the Night, was made available on July 4, 2014, and the second, Weeping Demon's Bell, on February 23, 2015.

== Reception ==
Reception

Review scores
Publication	Score
RPGFan	74%
CD-Action	40/100
TechnologyTell	A−

99 Spirits has received reviews in a wide range, from negative to highly positive. The website RPGFan gave it the score 74%, while the Polish magazine CD-Action gave it 40/100, and the website TechnologyTell gave it the rating A−, and the website USgamer cited it as an example of creativity in the Japanese role-playing genre.

Both RPGFan and TechnologyTell have been positive to the game's battle mechanics, calling the battles unique and inventive: RPGFan called them exciting, but ultimately repetitive, and questioned whether the gameplay would "click" with players; and TechnologyTell said that it can be tedious to fill up the gems' gauges. CD-Action was negative to the gameplay, and called battles shallow and primitive mini-games. RPGFan criticized the overworld map for being plain and uninspired, and for having repetitive level designs. Additionally, they felt that the hunger meter was an unnecessary and forced addition, especially considering how the size of the game's inventory limited how much food the player character can carry with her.

The game's presentation has been mostly positively received. RPGFan called the art "[not] exceptional, but [...] solid and aesthetically pleasing", saying that the hand-drawn style matches the feeling and setting of the game well. They also appreciated the character portraits that are shown during dialogue, saying that they help develop characters' personality. They did however feel that the art direction was disappointing, citing the bare overworld and lack of animations for spirits and characters as examples. TechnologyTell said that the most impressive part of the presentation was the character art; they said that the designs were reminiscent of anime, and that they were eager to see what each spirit looked like. Both RPGFan and TechnologyTell appreciated the game's sound. TechnologyTell called the music "more than some generic JRPG fodder" and worth listening to both inside and outside the game, and found both the English and Japanese voice acting to be well done; this surprised them, as they had not expected that from an indie game. RPGFan said that the music fits the game perfectly, with mystical Eastern tunes that draws players into the game and sets the scene, and fast-moving, high-pitched music in battles that add to the tension, but wished there was more variety in the background music. They liked the voice acting, saying that Hanabusa's cries in battle fit perfectly. Reception for the game's story has been mixed: TechnologyTell called it inventive, and thought the focus on Tsukumogami folklore worked well; RPGFan said that it "provides little we haven't seen before" and only holds minor interest; and USgamer called the premise unoriginal.
