= Aces of the Pacific =

1992 video game

- Developer: Dynamix
- Publisher: Sierra On-Line
- Designer: Damon Slye
- Programmer: Bob Lindstrom
- Artist: Mark Peasley
- Composer: Jan Paul Moorhead
- Platform: MS-DOS
- Release: 1992
- Genre: Combat flight simulation
- Mode: Single-player

Aces of the Pacific is a combat flight simulation game developed by Dynamix for MS-DOS compatible operating systems and published by Sierra On-Line in 1992. The game takes place during World War II. Players can choose to play a single mission or a career path in United States Army Air Forces, United States Navy, United States Marines, Imperial Japanese Army, or Imperial Japanese Navy. Dynamix followed-up the game with Aces Over Europe in 1993.

An Amiga version of Aces of the Pacific was previewed, but not released.

== Gameplay ==
Aces of the Pacific features various warplanes of the World War II era, such as the F6F Hellcat and the Zero. The game includes historical missions, should the player choose to play them during the course of their career or as a single mission. Historical missions include the Japanese Navy's surprise Attack on Pearl Harbor, defense of Pearl Harbor by a handful of Army Air Corps P-40 Warhawks based at Wheeler Field, fighter/bomber combat during the Battle of Midway, the Battle of Leyte Gulf, the Battle of Coral Sea, and the mission to shoot down Admiral Isoroku Yamamoto after deciphering Japanese messages of his scheduled plans to visit island bases.

Numerous World War II aces make an appearance in the game, and the player can fly either with or against them through the course of their career. Dick Bong, Thomas McGuire, David McCampbell, Joe Foss, and Pappy Boyington are some of the American aces that appear in the game. Accomplished aces of the Imperial Japanese Navy such as Hiroyoshi Nishizawa, Tetsuzō Iwamoto, and Saburo Sakai also take to the skies of the Pacific.

If the 1946 Expansion Pack is installed, at the end of the war, the player may choose to continue in an alternate history in which atomic bombs were never used on Japan. The game calls the campaign Operation Coronet, the planned invasion of Japan. This extra campaign contains numerous prototype aircraft that were developed before the war's end but never saw combat in World War II.

== Reception ==
Reception

Review score
| Publication | Score |
|---|---|
| Zero | 93/100 |

Aces of the Pacific was a commercial hit, with sales of 350,000 units.

Computer Gaming World's Doug Fick in September 1992 called Aces of the Pacific "simultaneously awesome and disappointing." The reviewer praised the graphics, documentation, and gameplay, but found that even a fast computer could not run the software with sufficient performance, the AI enemies and sound were inferior to those of Red Baron, and that aircraft performance was unrealistic. He concluded that "Aces of the Pacific is 80% 'battle-ready'" and hoped that the developer would "provide that extra 20%." In December, Fick reported that Dynamix had significantly improved performance without sacrificing graphics, and also improved opponents' AI, sound, and aircraft realism. He concluded that "as updated, Aces of the Pacific lives up to its tremendous advanced billing and is now superior to Red Baron." In March 1993 Fick reported that he enjoyed the WWII: 1946 expansion disk, but wished that it included a mission builder as with Red Baron. He concluded that "It serves as a nice addition ... but is not essential". A 1993 wargame survey by the magazine gave the game four stars out of five, calling it "the flight simulator of World War II". The game received 5 out of 5 stars in Dragon. The editors of PCGames nominated Aces of the Pacific for their award for the best flight simulator of 1992, but gave the prize to Falcon 3.0.

In 1994 PC Gamer US named Aces of the Pacific the 12th best computer game ever. The editors wrote, "With its unsurpassed variety of aircraft and mission types, Aces of the Pacific may well be the most gratifying air-combat simulation ever made." In 1996 Computer Gaming World ranked it as the 47th best game of all time, for setting "new standards for graphics and performance." In 2003 IGN ranked it as the 92nd top game, stating: "Realism, aircraft, technology, multiplayer and many ways to kill many a folk made Aces of the Pacific an immediate hit. (...) Better flight sims have come and gone, but this was one of the first truly glorious ones and its brand is still burnt in our minds."
