= 3-D Ultra Pinball: Thrillride =

2000 video game

3D Ultra Pinball: Thrillride
- PC cover art
- Developers: Dynamix; Left Field Productions (GBC)
- Publisher: Sierra On-Line
- Series: 3-D Ultra Pinball
- Platforms: Windows, Macintosh, Game Boy Color
- Release: Game Boy Color: NA: December 29, 2000
- Genre: Pinball
- Mode: Single-player

3-D Ultra Pinball: Thrillride is a 2000 pinball game developed for Windows and Macintosh by Dynamix Inc. and for the Game Boy Color by Left Field Productions, and published by Sierra On-Line. This is the final title in the 3-D Ultra Pinball series of pinball games.

== Gameplay ==
A screenshot of Thrillride, depicting gameplay from the PC version.

Thrillride is a pinball game with an amusement park theme, set in Hersheypark. Gameplay involves the player collecting points by hitting bumpers, lighting up words, completing different rides and visiting the "snack shop". For the PC version, the game features one primary table, and a secondary Thrill Zone table. There are two multiball ramps: the Wildcat and the Coal Cracker. The former is themed as a roller coaster and the latter as a water ride. Two of the Fun Zone puzzles direct the players to secondary tables: a River Rafting table and a Lightning Racer Virtual Coaster. In addition, Thrillride features a number of minigames on the side, including hitting markers to activate the Fun Zone, or a Hershey's Hide and Seek event triggered after hitting the Snack Bar 50 times, where players must use the ball to catch the animated treats hiding around the primary table.

== Reception ==
Reception

Review scores
Publication	Score	
Publication	GBC	PC
AllGame	3/5	2.5/5
GameSpot		6.3
IGN	5/10	7.9
Adrenaline Vault		4/5

Thrillride received mixed reviews, with the PC version of the game received more lukewarm reception. Ron Dulin of GameSpot praised the "bonus tasks" and "substantial bonus games", although noted that Thrillride "is meant as nothing more than a fun diversion and not as a hardcore pinball simulation aimed at silver-ball fanatics", observing "the lack of a challenge makes the game a bit tedious". IGN stated that the "quality of the simulation is excellent", and praised the game's "smorgasboard of special modes" that "excel on all counts", whilst noting the "absence of replay value incentive". Computer Games stated that the game was "pretty fun" with "plenty of skill shots", praising the visuals of the game for being "colorful, loud (and) in your face".

The Game Boy Color version of Thrillride received mixed to negative reviews. Writing for Allgame, Jon Thompson praised the "impressive" rules list and range of "different modes and multiball events" to add to the game, but stated "the physicas of the table are not great...as the ball is quite floaty and reacts oddly to many hits and shots". In a negative review, IGN stated that the game was "not nearly as fun or addictive as it could be", observing that "the visuals are flat", with tables being "downright empty, with boring ramps and few features".
