= 99 Levels to Hell =

- Developer: bom667
- Publisher: Zaxis
- Engine: Unity
- Platforms: Windows, OS X, Linux
- Release: Windows, OS X; February 26, 2013; Linux; February 19, 2014
- Genres: Roguelike, platform, shooter
- Mode: Single-player

99 Levels to Hell is a roguelike platform shooter by Danish developer bom667 and published by Zaxis. The game has 100 levels which are randomly generated, and they are divided into 10 sections of 10 levels each. Death in a section sends players back to the beginning of the section rather than the beginning of the entire game. In the game, players assume the role of a wizard and start off with a shotgun until they can find better means such as laser weapons or magic.

== Release ==
The game released on February 26, 2013, for Windows and OS X, with a Linux release coming one year later on February 19, 2014.

== Reception ==
99 Levels to Hell received generally mixed reviews. According to review aggregator Metacritic, 99 Levels to Hell received "mixed or average reviews", with an average score of 66 out of 100 from five critic reviews.

James Cunningham of Hardcore Gamer rated the game 4 out of 5, saying, "99 Levels to Hell is a fun and bloody descent into the not-quite-bottomless depths, loaded with replayability and almost impossible to put down until the poor explorer has lost his last heart of health." Christian Dolan, reviewing the game for Eurogamer, was more critical, giving the game a 6 out of 10. He described the game as "relatively entertaining stuff", but noting that it "struggles to assert its own identity", ultimately finding it hard to not compare it to its competition.
