= 99Vidas =

2016 video game

- Developer: QuByte Interactive
- Publisher: QuByte Interactive
- Producer: Marivaldo Cabral
- Designer: Bruno Carvalho
- Composer: Rafael Langoni Smith
- Engine: Unity
- Platforms: Windows, macOS, Linux, PlayStation 4, PlayStation 3, Vita, Xbox One, Nintendo Switch
- Release: December 22, 2016: Windows, Mac, Linux; WW: December 22, 2016 PS3, PS4, Vita, Xbox One; NA: July 18, 2017 Switch; WW: November 27, 2018
- Genre: Beat 'em up
- Modes: Single-player, multiplayer

99Vidas (Portuguese for "99 Lives") is a retro-styled side-scrolling beat 'em up video game developed and published by Brazilian studio QuByte Interactive. It was first released for Microsoft Windows, macOS, and Linux in late 2016, followed by PlayStation 3, PlayStation 4, and PlayStation Vita in 2017. A Nintendo Switch version was released in November 2018.

== Gameplay ==
99Vidas is a side-scrolling beat 'em up initially featuring six playable characters, with five more being unlocked through multiple play sessions, bringing the total number of playable characters to 11. It features cooperative and competitive game modes, for up to four players, which can be played either locally or online.

Each character has unique attributes such as speed and strength, as well as an elemental alignment (fire, water, wind, lightning, et al.), which dictates the quality of their attacks, combos, and special moves. Characters gain experience points by defeating enemies and collecting special items which can then be used by the player to upgrade their abilities and combos, or to unlock new ones.

The campaign and survival modes can be played solo or by up to four players cooperatively. In campaign mode, players progress through the story together. In survival, they face unending waves of enemies, with a limited number of lives and ever-increasing difficulty, the objective being attaining high scores, which are posted to an arcade-style leaderboard. In versus mode, two to four players can play head-to-head competitive matches, where the last one standing wins.

== Plot ==
99Vidas is set in an anachronistic fictional universe inspired by 1980s and 1990s pop culture and video game aesthetic. The story starts as an artifact known as 99Vidas goes missing. This artifact is believed to hold such great power it could threaten the existence of the universe, should it fall into the wrong hands. Players play as "guardians" of 99Vidas, heroes with elemental powers whose duty is to protect the artifact.

== Development ==
Development of the game started in early 2015 as a joint project by Brazilian game studio QuByte Interactive and Brazilian gaming podcast 99Vidas, its namesake. Producer Marivaldo Cabral told IGN Brazil that the idea was to make a beat 'em up game that blended classic mechanics and aesthetics of the genre with more modern gameplay elements. Stated influences and inspirations included late 1980s and 1990s titles such as Double Dragon, Final Fight, Golden Axe, and Streets of Rage.

A demo was developed using Unity, featuring hand-drawn sprites and sound samples to emulate a 16-bit look and feel. Following its free release, a campaign was set up on Brazilian crowdfunding website Catarse in July 2015. The game raised R$127,000 Brazilian reais over the following two months, surpassing its initial goal of R$80,000 for the development on PC. This enabled the development of console ports for PlayStation 4, PlayStation 3, PlayStation Vita, and Xbox One.

The game was approved on Steam Greenlight in September 2015 and subsequently released on the Steam digital marketplace on December 22, 2016. On July 18, 2017, 99Vidas was released for PlayStation 4, PlayStation 3, and PlayStation Vita. A Nintendo Switch port was released on November 27, 2018.

=== Downloadable content ===
99Vidas received downloadable content called "The Last Battle". It adds levels, enemies, and more. The content is available for both single-player and multiplayer game modes, both local and online, and was released only for the PlayStation 4.
