= Red Baron (1990 video game) =

- Cover art
- Developer: Dynamix
- Publisher: Sierra On-Line
- Designer: Damon Slye
- Programmer: Paul Bowman
- Artist: Mark Peasley
- Platforms: MS-DOS, Amiga, Mac OS
- Release: NA: December 31, 1990; EU: December 1990; EU: 1992 (Amiga); NA: 1992 (Mac)
- Genre: Air combat simulation
- Modes: Single-player, multiplayer

Red Baron is a combat flight simulation video game for MS-DOS created by Damon Slye at Dynamix. It was published by Sierra On-Line in 1990. The game was ported for Amiga and Macintosh computers in 1992.

The game is set on the Western Front of World War I. The player can engage in single missions or career mode, flying for either the German Air Service or the Royal Flying Corps. In the course of the game the player might find themselves either flying in the Red Baron's squadron Jasta 11, or encountering him as an enemy above the front.

An expansion pack, Red Baron: Mission Builder, was released in 1992. A port of the game for the Nintendo 64 was announced, but was later cancelled.

== Gameplay ==
Gameplay screenshot

Many of the famous German, British, and French combat aircraft of World War I are available to fly including the Fokker E.I Eindecker, the Fokker Dr.I Triplane, the Sopwith Camel, and the SPAD XIII. The game features somewhat unrealistic physics as it was mainly intended as an entertainment game instead of a true flight simulator, although the unique flying characteristics of some of the aircraft were implemented such as the gyroscopic effect created by the Sopwith Camel's rotary engine and the Albatros's upper wings shearing at high negative G loads. The player also has to deal with problems the real fighter pilots of World War I faced, such as gun jams, flak, engine damage, and possibly bleeding to death if they were wounded and could not land at an aerodrome in time.

There are several types of missions in the game: dogfight; scramble; patrol; balloon busting/protection; reconnaissance escort; and bomber escort/interception; and Zeppelin hunt. There were also recreations of historical missions. The majority of the missions are carried out with one to three wingmen for the player, although the player may choose to fly missions solo if appointed as the flight leader.

- Dogfight: The player's squadron faces up with an enemy squadron. The player may choose whether to start the mission near the action or at the aerodrome.
- One-on-one dogfight: If the player scores many victories, an enemy ace may present a challenge to a one-on-one dogfight. Some enemy aces may cheat by taking along wingmen.
- Scramble: An enemy squadron approaches the player's aerodrome, and the player's squadron must intercept them.
- Patrol: The player patrols the Front. Anti-aircraft artillery and enemy aircraft are usually encountered although the latter does not always happen.
- Balloon Busting/Protection: In balloon busting missions, the player's squadron is tasked to eliminate enemy observation balloons. While stationary balloons are easy to destroy and equally qualified as victories, the player will also have to cope with enemy fighters and anti-aircraft weapons. In balloon protection missions, the player has to defend friendly balloons from an enemy squadron. Balloon busting missions may be started from the aerodrome or near the enemy balloons.
- Reconnaissance Escort: The player and wingmen escort one or two reconnaissance aircraft over the Front while enemy fighters try to destroy them.
- Bomber Escort/Interception: Gotha and Handley-Page bombers attack factories or trains. The player either escorts friendly bombers or intercepts and destroys enemy bombers.
- Zeppelin Hunt: Zeppelin dirigibles bomb the English homeland, and it is up to the player to shoot them down. This mission will not happen unless the player is flying on the Allied side.
- Historic Mission: Historic engagements can be relived on either side. Missions include the engagement for which William Bishop received his Victoria Cross and the final dogfight of the Red Baron.

The player can select any mission to fly on either the German or Allied sides. Location, aircraft type, wingmen, and famous aces can also be chosen for the mission.

A career in either the German Air Service or British Royal Flying Corps runs from December 1915 to October 1918, just before the Armistice. As time progresses, the player is transferred to various historical aerodromes in France and in England. The Front also shifts as it did during the War and battles such as Verdun are noted. More advanced aircraft are also introduced in the proper time periods. The player's number of aerial kills is kept track of and he is promoted in rank and awarded medals as he progresses, and he can eventually customize the colors of his aircraft. If the player is wounded in combat and is able to land/crash land in friendly territory, they spend several months recuperating from their wounds, but if they end up in enemy territory, they spend several months in a prisoner-of-war camp until they escape back to their side. The timeline continues during the recovery/imprisonment periods, so it is possible that the player will return to duty at a different aerodrome flying newer aircraft.

Depending on how well the player does, they can be assigned to an aerodrome that has a famous ace and can fly missions with them, and depending on the time period and the location of the aerodrome, the player can encounter the famous enemy aces that were in the area during that time period.

A multiplayer version of the game was available on The Sierra Network. Two to four pilots competed in games lasting for ten minutes or three deaths.

== Release ==
Sierra acquired Dynamix while Red Baron was being developed, and it became the first game in Dynamix's "Great Warplanes Series" that Sierra published. The press discussed the competition between Red Baron and MicroProse's Knights of the Sky. In 1997, Sierra officially released the 16-color version of Red Baron as a free download on their website as a promotion.

Dynamix ran a contest in Computer Gaming World consisting of 7 questions about the game. The reader had to answer the questions on a and send the answers to Dynamix. The first five readers to get all answers correct received a replica of the Blue Max and an autographed copy of the game.

In October 2013, an unsuccessful Kickstarter campaign was started to fund a re-release of Red Baron.

Red Baron is available for purchase on Steam and GOG.

== Reception ==
Slye later said that Red Baron's success made Dynamix become known as a developer of flight simulators. Sierra considered it the first in its Aces line of simulations. According to the company, combined sales of Red Baron, Aces of the Pacific, Aces Over Europe, Aces of the Deep, and an anthology surpassed one million units by the end of March 1996.

Warren Spector—producer of Origin Systems's WW1 simulation Wings of Glory—was a fan, calling it "an astonishing accomplishment". Computer Gaming World approved of Red Baron's accurate history and realistic flight models and combat, and option to record missions, ultimately calling it the best flight simulator. In a 1991 survey of World War I flight simulations, Computer Gaming World described Red Baron as less realistic than Knights of the Sky, but with excellent graphics and gameplay. Surveys of strategy and war games that year and in 1993, however, gave it five stars out of five and stated that it was "the best World War I air simulator ever done", with historical accuracy and superb game play. The magazine gave the Mission Builder four stars. A 1993 review of the Sierra Network multiplayer version called it "a real pleasure ... One of the best on-line gaming values yet". The game got 5 out of 5 stars in Dragon. The game sold more than 500,000 units worldwide.

Red Baron won Computer Gaming World's 1991 Simulation of the Year award, and in 1993 the magazine named the game to its Hall of Fame, stating that it stood as the high watermark of realistic air combat for many gamers. That year the magazine told a reader asking for "the most enjoyable flight simulation game" that "most of us still opt for Red Baron". In 1996, the magazine named Red Baron as #4 on its list of the best PC games of all time, positively comparing it to Spectrum HoloByte's Falcon 3.0.

In 1994, PC Gamer US named Red Baron as the 17th best computer game ever. In 1991, PC Format placed Red Baron on its list of the 50 best computer games of all time.

In 1998, PC Gamer declared it the 20th-best computer game ever released.
