= The Adventures of Willy Beamish =

1991 video game

- Developer: Dynamix
- Publishers: Sierra On-Line; Activision (Windows)
- Director: Jeff Tunnell
- Programmer: Louie McCrady
- Artist: Shawn Sharp
- Writers: Meryl Perutz; Tony Perutz; David Selle; Tom Brooke
- Composers: Christopher Stevens; Jan Paul Moorhead; Don Latarski
- Platforms: Amiga; MS-DOS; Classic Mac OS; Sega CD
- Release: Amiga, MS-DOS: WW: 1991; Macintosh: WW: 1992; Sega CD: WW: 1993
- Genre: Adventure
- Mode: Single-player

The Adventures of Willy Beamish is a graphic adventure game developed by Dynamix and published in 1991 by Sierra On-Line. The player takes on the role of the eponymous youngster in a game that somewhat parodies the adventure genre. The game pioneered the use of in-game graphics drawn to resemble classic hand-drawn cartoon animation. It was initially released for MS-DOS and the Amiga (on 12 3.5" floppy discs) and was ported to the Sega CD in 1993. CD versions of the game complemented the in-game text with speech and included a few other cosmetic changes. A sequel was reportedly planned starring Willy Beamish as a late teenager, but the project was canceled.

The game was re-released by Activision in March 2017 on GOG.com with support for Microsoft Windows bundled with DOSBox.

== Plot ==
MS-DOS screenshot

Nine-year-old Willy Beamish is introduced as a brat archetype of the late 1980s, being the middle child in a typical upper-middle-class American family. Willy is passionate about science fiction, hanging out with his gang in their tree house and playing video games, being highly skilled with his Nintari console (a portmanteau of Nintendo and Atari). His existence is not entirely idyllic, though, as he is periodically tormented by a number of people. These include various staff members at school, a vicious teenage school bully named Spider, and his two sisters, Brianna and Tiffany, respectively, a preschool prodigy and an angsty teenager. Their parents, Gordon and Sheila, are portrayed respectively as a middle-aged career pursuer and a glamorous soccer mom. They both love Willy, but are at their wits' end with his mischief, and are seriously considering enrolling him in military school. Willy is occasionally visited by the ghost of his grandfather, who serves as his conscience. His adventures unfold over the first few days of summer vacation in the fictional American town of Frumpton.

Willy Beamish is sent to detention on the last day of school after his pet frog Horny disrupted the final school assembly by dislodging the principal's toupee. After either evading detention or waiting it out, Willy returns home to his family. As they all gather for dinner, Willy's father Gordon, who was due a promotion at work, shocks the entire family by announcing his unexpected layoff. To cut family expenses, Willy is denied the entry fee to the video game championship he was training for. Also, his access to the Nintari console is revoked due to a "C" grade tainting an otherwise satisfactory report card, which Willy has failed to hide from his parents. Willy leverages his elder sister Tiffany's weaknesses to get back the Nintari key she was given custody of and resume training.

The next day, Willy learns that Tootsweet, the local producer of artificial sweetener, is sponsoring a frog jump contest with a prize in cash and decides to enlist Horny. At the same time, Gordon applies for a job as head of public relations at Tootsweet. Both are unaware that Tootsweet CEO Leona Humpford is conspiring with union leader Louis Stoole to send Frumpton plumbers on strike, thus leading the town to a sewer system crisis for Leona to profit from, while using the new head of PR as a scapegoat. Willy starts training Horny for the frog jump contest. Later that day, he is left in the care of a babysitter named Alicia, who transforms into a vampire bat. Willy manages to dispose of the creature by using a vacuum cleaner, only to wake up to the realization that it was a nightmare.

Willy travels by ferry to the other side of town to register his frog for the contest. On the ferry, he befriends a family of Japanese tourists. After completing the registration, Willy is ambushed by a local street gang and runs away. He stumbles again upon the Japanese tourists, who reveal themselves as ninjas and come to his aid by attacking the street thugs. Meanwhile, Gordon has obtained the job at Tootsweet: by this time, however, the plumbers' strike has caused the sewer system to overflow, polluting Frumpton's water.

At the frog jump contest, Horny places first or second, either way earning Willy enough money to participate in the Nintari championship, but all the frogs, including Horny, are captured by order of Leona, who plans to eat them in a frog legs dish. Inside Tootsweet's headquarters, Willy overhears an argument between Gordon and Leona over the sewer crisis. After evading security, Willy sneaks inside Leona's mansion, rescues the frogs, and foils Chef Childish's plan for cooking frog legs. There, he learns that Leona and Louis are planning to eliminate Gordon after he has publicly unveiled their scheme and announced his resignation. Willy is captured, but the frogs team up to help him escape. He then infiltrates the sludge processing plant and, after overcoming Leona's henchmen, rescues his father and defeats Leona and Louis by flushing them down the sewage drain. The game ends with Willy being celebrated as a local hero and claiming victory in the Nintari championship.

== Gameplay ==
Many of the challenges that Willy faces are typical choices that a nine-year-old boy must make: whether to push his little sister on the swingset (and how high to push her), whether to mow the lawn, whether to wash his dad's car, and whether to take his dog for a walk or feed him. Making unwise choices can lead to various negative consequences. For instance, if Willy does not wash his father's car, he does not receive his allowance, and cannot buy an item that he will need later in the game. In addition, Willy has a score system called the Trouble-O-meter, a thermometer with "Good Boy" at the bottom and "Cadet School" at the top. Actions that annoy Willy's parents will cause the meter to increase by one level, and really infuriating them will cause it to increase further. If the mercury reaches "Cadet School", that is where Willy goes, and the game is over.

== Ports ==
The Sega CD edition of the game has slow loading times and slightly washed-out colors. In an effort to compensate for the slow loading time, the game features a "Start" button that allows players to manipulate a set of twirling black and white balls, referred to in the manual as "Laser Balls". A glitch in some editions of the game caused the game to freeze up during certain scenes.

That edition includes a minigame on Willy's Nintari system in his bedroom (in the IBM PC compatible version, playing the Nintari just plays a cutscene of a video game). The minigame, known as Super Space K'Noidtrix, combines elements of Space Invaders, Tetris and Arkanoid.

The "talkie" CD versions of the game, besides adding voice actors, extended the game's introduction and replaced the still character portraits with animated versions. The voice actor who plays Willy Beamish is Michael Zibelman. Additionally, while the floppy PC version offered the option of MT-32 sound and music, the CD version eliminates that option, leaving only Soundblaster and Pro Audio Spectrum as sound options. Certain retail boxes of the game included a mail-in form for a free Willy Beamish-themed wristwatch.

== Reception ==
Reception

Review score
| Publication | Score |
|---|---|
| Adventure Gamers | 3.5/5 (PC) |

The Adventures of Willy Beamish was a commercial hit. Craig Ritchie of Retro Gamer called it "one of Dynamix's most popular titles of the era". It sold over 80,000 copies in the United States by early 1992.

Charles Ardai wrote in Computer Gaming World in 1993 that the CD-ROM version of Willy Beamish was disappointing compared to the corresponding version of Space Quest IV, with poor voice acting that was, in his opinion, "insulting to children and inconsiderate of adults, whose skin it will make crawl". Ardai also disliked the game's tone of "smirking, adolescent sexiness" as incongruent with a small child as the hero, and also said that the CD-ROM version of the game should have eliminated the voice acting option for a better gameplay experience. In 1994, the magazine said of the CD version that "the acting adds little to the game, and it is fair to say that some of the voices are miscast".
