= Dynamix =

American video game developer

Dynamix, Inc.
- Type: Subsidiary
- Industry: Video games
- Founded: 1984; 42 years ago
- Founder: Jeff Tunnell; Damon Slye
- Defunct: August 14, 2001; 25 years ago
- Headquarters: Eugene, Oregon, U.S.
- Parent: Sierra On-Line (1990–2001)
- Website: dynamix.com (archived)

Dynamix, Inc. was an American developer of video games from 1984 to 2001, best known for the flight simulator Red Baron, the puzzle game The Incredible Machine, the Front Page Sports series, Betrayal at Krondor, and the online multiplayer game Tribes.

== History ==
The company was founded in Eugene, Oregon in 1984 by Jeff Tunnell and Damon Slye. Their first title, Stellar 7, was released before company founding and was later remade with the Dynamix name on it. They made a number of games for the Commodore 64, among them Project Firestart, which was one of the most atmospheric titles for the C64.

In the following years, Dynamix created a line of action games for Penguin Software and Electronic Arts, including one of the first games for the Amiga, Arcticfox. Later titles were developed for Activision. After self-publishing their games for a short while, in 1990 Dynamix was bought by Sierra On-Line.

Dynamix had published A-10 Tank Killer and distributed it through Mediagenic, but the acquisition occurred during the development of Red Baron, which became the first game in Dynamix's "Great Warplanes" flight simulator series published by Sierra. Dynamix created some of their most famous games, including a line of adventures and simulators that included Red Baron and The Adventures of Willy Beamish. They also created the puzzle game The Incredible Machine, along with the spinoff Sid & Al's Incredible Toons. Another successful product line was the Front Page Sports series, designed by Pat Cook and Allen McPheeters which included Football, Baseball, and Golf. Versions of Red Baron and Front Page Sports Football were included as part of the ImagiNation Network.

As a developer, Dynamix was notable for their early use of digitized graphics, animations and sounds effects in PC, Atari ST and Amiga games. The techniques were first used in 1988 in Pete Rose Pennant Fever, and used most notably in movie tie-in games like Die Hard and Ghostbusters II, as well as David Wolf: Secret Agent and Death Track.

By 1994 Slye agreed with a Computer Gaming World statement that "Now when someone hears 'Dynamix' they immediately think 'flight simulator'". In 1994, the first game in a new series called Metaltech was released, a giant robot combat game with similarities to the BattleTech universe and games. This series resulted in two Earthsiege games and eventually Starsiege. As a side development of the Starsiege game, the successful Tribes series was created. Dynamix also created Outpost 2: Divided Destiny, the second game in Sierra's strategy/survival franchise, Outpost.

The Dynamix studio was closed by Sierra On-Line on August 14, 2001, as part of Sierra's restructuring under Vivendi Universal Interactive Publishing. Several veterans of the studio (including Tunnell), however, stayed in Eugene and founded a new studio / electronic publisher, GarageGames.

== Torque Game Engine ==
Some of the core Dynamix members started GarageGames, an independent-friendly engine developer and game publisher. They negotiated an agreement with Sierra for the source code to the Tribes 2 game engine. After reworking the code, GarageGames released it as a V12 but were soon told that an engine already had the name, so it was then called the Torque Game Engine (or TGE). The source code for TGE, a professional-grade 3D engine, was available to nearly anyone for fees starting at USD100, but has since been released as open source under the MIT License.

== List of games developed by Dynamix ==
Title	Release	Publisher
Stellar 7	1983 (Apple II); 1984 (C64)	Software Entertainment Company; Penguin Software (C64)
Sword of Kadash	1985 (Apple II, C64); 1986 (Atari ST, MacOS)	Penguin Software; Polarware (MacOS)
Skyfox (ports only)	1986 (Atari ST, MacOS)	Electronic Arts
Arcticfox	1986 (Amiga, Apple II, Atari ST, C64); 1987 (DOS); 1988 (Amstrad CPC, PC-98, ZX Spectrum); 1989 (MSX)	Electronic Arts; DROsoft (MSX)
GBA Championship Basketball: Two-on-Two	1986 (Amiga, Amstrad CPC, Atari ST, C64, DOS); 1987 (Apple IIGS, ZX Spectrum)	Activision
Championship Baseball	1987 (Amiga, Atari ST)	Activision
Skyfox II: The Cygnus Conflict	1987 (C64); 1988 (Amiga, DOS); 1989 (Atari ST)	Electronic Arts
The Train: Escape to Normandy	1988 (DOS)	Accolade
Pete Rose Pennant Fever	1988 (DOS)	Gamestar, Inc.
Caveman Ughlympics	1988 (C64); 1989 (DOS); 1990 (NES)	Electronic Arts; Data East (NES)
F-14 Tomcat	1988 (C64); 1990 (DOS)	Activision
Abrams Battle Tank	1989 (DOS); 1991 (Genesis)	Electronic Arts; Sega (Genesis)
Motocross	1989 (DOS)	Gamestar, Inc.
MechWarrior	1989 (DOS); 1992 (X68000); 1993 (PC-98)	Activision; Cross Media Soft (PC-98, X68000)
A-10 Tank Killer	1989 (DOS); 1991 (Amiga)	Dynamix
Ghostbusters II	1989 (DOS)	Activision
Deathtrack	1989 (DOS)	Activision
Die Hard	1989 (C64, DOS)	Activision
David Wolf: Secret Agent	1989 (DOS)	Dynamix
Project Firestart	1989 (C64)	Electronic Arts
Stellar 7 (re-release)	1990 (DOS); 1991 (Amiga); 1993 (MacOS)	Dynamix
Red Baron	1990 (DOS); 1992 (Amiga, MacOS)	Sierra On-Line
Rise of the Dragon	1990 (DOS); 1991 (Amiga, MacOS); 1992 (Sega CD); 2017 (Windows)	Sierra On-Line; Dynamix (Sega CD); Activision (Windows)
The Adventures of Willy Beamish	1991 (DOS); 1992 (Amiga, MacOS); 1993 (Sega CD); 2017 (Windows)	Sierra On-Line; Sega (Sega CD); Activision (Windows)
Nova 9: The Return of Gir Draxon	1991 (DOS); 1992 (Amiga)	Sierra On-Line
Heart of China	1991 (Amiga, DOS); 1992 (MacOS); 2017 (Windows)	Sierra On-Line; Dynamix (DOS); Activision (Windows)
Red Baron: Mission Builder	1991 (DOS)	Sierra On-Line
WWII: 1946	1992 (DOS, Windows 3.x)	Sierra On-Line
Aces of the Pacific	1992 (DOS, Windows 3.x)	Sierra On-Line
The Incredible Machine	1992 (DOS); 1994 (3DO)	Sierra On-Line; Dynamix (3DO)
Front Page Sports Football	1992 (DOS)	Dynamix
Take a Break! Crosswords	1992 (Windows)	Sierra On-Line
Stellar 7: Draxon's Revenge	1993 (3DO)	Dynamix (3DO)
Stellar-Fire	1993 (Sega CD)	Dynamix
Sid & Al's Incredible Toons	1993 (DOS)	Sierra On-Line
Betrayal at Krondor	1993 (DOS); 2010 (Windows)	Dynamix; Activision (Windows)
Alien Legacy	1993 (DOS)	Sierra On-Line
Space Quest V	1993 (DOS)	Sierra On-Line
Front Page Sports Football Pro	1993 (DOS)	Dynamix
Aces Over Europe	1993 (DOS)	Sierra On-Line
Take a Break! Pinball	1993 (Windows 3.x)	Sierra On-Line
Sierra Soccer	1994 (Amiga)	Sierra On-Line
Metaltech: Battledrome	1994 (DOS)	Sierra On-Line
Metaltech: Earthsiege	1994 (DOS)	Sierra On-Line
Front Page Sports: Baseball '94	1994 (DOS)	Sierra On-Line
Bouncers	1994 (Sega CD)	Sega
3-D Ultra Pinball	1995 (Windows, Windows 3.x, MacOS)	Sierra On-Line
Command: Aces of the Deep	1995 (Windows)	Sierra On-Line
The Incredible Machine 3	1995 (Windows, Windows 3.x)	Sierra On-Line
Earthsiege 2	1995 (Windows, Windows 3.x)	Sierra On-Line
Aces of the Deep Expansion Disk	1995 (DOS, Windows, Windows 3.x)	Sierra On-Line
Trophy Bass	1995 (Windows, Windows 3.x)	Sierra On-Line
Silent Thunder	1996 (Windows, Windows 3.x)	Sierra On-Line
MissionForce: CyberStorm	1996 (Windows)	Sierra On-Line
Front Page Sports: Trophy Bass 2	1996 (Windows, Windows 3.x)	Sierra On-Line
3-D Ultra Pinball: Creep Night	1996 (Windows, Windows 3.x, MacOS)	Sierra On-Line
Hunter Hunted	1996 (Windows)	Sierra On-Line
Front Page Sports: Trophy Bass 2 - Northern Lakes	1997 (Windows, Windows 3.x)	Sierra On-Line
3-D Ultra Pinball: The Lost Continent	1997 (MacOS, Windows, Windows 3.x)	Sierra On-Line
Red Baron II	1997 (Windows)	Sierra On-Line
Front Page Sports: Trophy Rivers	1997 (Windows, Windows 3.x)	Sierra On-Line
Front Page Sports: Ski Racing	1997 (Windows)	Sierra On-Line
Red Baron With Mission Builder	1997 (DOS, Windows)	Sierra On-Line
Outpost 2: Divided Destiny	1997 (Windows)	Sierra On-Line
Sierra Pro Pilot 98: The Complete Flight Simulator	1997 (Windows)	Sierra On-Line
3-D Ultra NASCAR Pinball	1998 (Windows); 1999 (MacOS)	Sierra On-Line
Starsiege	1999 (Windows)	Sierra On-Line
Starsiege: Tribes	1998 (Windows)	Sierra On-Line
CyberStorm 2: Corporate Wars	1998 (Windows)	Sierra On-Line
Pro Pilot 99	1998 (Windows)	Sierra On-Line
Red Baron 3-D	1998 (Windows)	Sierra On-Line
Driver's Education '99	1998(Windows)	Sierra On-Line
Field & Stream: Trophy Bass 3D	1999 (Windows)	Sierra On-Line
Curse You! Red Baron	1999 (Windows)	Sierra On-Line
3D Ultra Lionel Traintown	1999 (Windows)	Sierra On-Line
3-D Ultra Radio Control Racers	1999 (Windows)	Sierra On-Line
3-D Ultra Cool Pool	1999 (Windows)	Sierra On-Line
Field & Stream: Trophy Bass 4	2000 (Windows)	Sierra On-Line
Field & Stream: Trophy Hunting 4	2000 (Windows)	Sierra On-Line
Return of the Incredible Machine: Contraptions	2000 (Windows)	Sierra On-Line
RC Racers II	2000 (Windows)	Sierra On-Line
Tribes 2	2001 (Linux, Windows)	Sierra On-Line
The Incredible Machine: Even More Contraptions	2001 (MacOS, Palm OS, Windows)	Sierra On-Line
Mini Golf Maniacs (Unreleased)	2001 (Windows, PS2)	Sierra On-Line
