= Nova 9: The Return of Gir Draxon =

1991 video game

- Developer: Dynamix
- Publisher: Sierra On-Line
- Designer: Paul Bowman
- Platforms: Amiga, MS-DOS
- Release: 1991: MS-DOS; 1992: Amiga
- Genre: Shooter
- Mode: Single-player

Nova 9: The Return of Gir Draxon is a futuristic shooter video game developed by Dynamix and released by Sierra On-Line in 1991 for MS-DOS followed by an Amiga version in 1992. It is second sequel to Stellar 7.

== Gameplay ==
The player assumes the role of a futuristic tank pilot fighting alien threats across nine different star systems. The tank is designated as the Raven II and is equipped with forward-facing cannon with unlimited ammo that can fire two shot bursts, energy shields and armor (unlike the tank in the previous game Stellar 7). Damage to the player's tank after the shields are breached comes in the form of systems becoming less effective; this mostly effects mobility. Power-ups can be collected in this game, though the system works differently than in the previous game in the series. Here, up to nine power-ups can be stored and used when needed. The damage to the player's tank can permanently break power-up slots. Finally, the player's tank can be repaired by returning to a hidden asteroid base at a designated warp portal locations throughout the game. These appear on about every other world. If the tank is not particularly damaged when going to a repair portal, the player can also receive permanent upgrades to the tank as well; a few upgrades are required to advance the story, so they will happen at designated points in time even if the player's tank is badly damaged.

The game's enemies include anything from other tanks to mechanical birds equipped with a range of weapons including lasers, ballistic attacks, and mines. Each of the nine worlds has a theme to it, and the enemies on that world tend to follow the theme, such as a dinosaur world or a bug world; this was an advancement over the previous game, where enemies were often reused across worlds. Each alien world also has a boss that must be defeated, most of which require some level of creativity, such as shooting the boss in a weak point or using terrain against it. The final boss is Gir Draxon himself, in a horned skull-like super-tank. He has three phases to defeat, the first two of which require creative tactics; this level of boss complexity was rather impressive for the time.

The alien worlds were rendered as mostly featureless plains that looped around themselves eventually, though each world had a modest variety of 3D objects on it that represented rock formations or occasionally alien plant life. The worlds' backgrounds were digital paintings of alien skies that wrapped around the horizon.

The game lacks a save feature. The player has effectively two "Continues" - basically, extra lives - and that was it before the game needed to be restarted from the beginning. Experienced players would also soon notice that damage effects to the tank could be overly crippling, reducing the fun of playing or making the game unwinnable on the current life. For example, significant damage to one side of the tank could completely remove the ability to turn in a given direction; damage effects tended to pile up rapidly, since as mobility was reduced, it became harder to avoid further incoming damage or keep enemies away from the tank's wounded side. The damage effects allowed the tank to survive more damage than the unarmored one in Stellar 7, which simply died when its shields (hitpoints) ran out.

== Plot ==
Gir Draxon, the evil overlord defeated at the end of the previous game (Stellar 7) crash lands on an alien world, broken and scarred. He quickly locates a powerful alien artifact that controls the minds of his victims, slaughters the harmless alien creatures nearby, and begins rebuilding his interstellar empire. A distress call goes out from one world as he conquers it, which quickly turns to an image of obviously mind-controlled victims claiming that everything is fine. Meanwhile, the protagonist from the previous game has built a hidden facility in a large asteroid amid a vast field of asteroids where he can design more powerful tools to fight evil like Gir Draxon. The most notable creation is that of the Raven II heavy tank, a direct upgrade over the powerful but fragile Raven I from Stellar 7. He also has a robotic repair droid and an AI computer that contains the personality of his late wife, who was lost in Gir Draxon's first attack on Earth in Stellar 7.

As the hero advances through each world, defeating Gir Draxon's forces as he goes, Draxon's minions close on the hidden base. Eventually, they find it as the game nears its conclusion, and the AI destroys the base to prevent Draxon's minions from finding information on the Raven II and using it to defeat the protagonist. After Draxon is defeated in the final battle, his super-tank overloads, electrocuting and killing him. The hero then returns to the asteroid field and finds evidence that the AI computer containing his wife's personality may have survived the blast.

== Reception ==
The game got 4 1/2 out of 5 stars in Dragon. Computer Gaming World praised the game's "breathtaking graphics", high difficulty, and intelligent opponents, only criticizing the lack of a save game option. The magazine concluded that "Nova 9 is an excellent offering for arcade fans everywhere ... a thoroughly professional effort".

== Reviews ==
- Amiga Games - October 1992
- Amiga Joker - September 1992
