= Front Page Sports Football =

Video game series

Front Page Sports Football (or FPS Football), first released in 1992, was the first in a series of American football simulations released by Sierra Online. The Front Page Sports series was notable for being one of the first football simulations to include a career mode where players aged and retired, and for the number of statistics it offered. The first game did not have a license from the NFL or its players association, meaning that all teams and players offered were fictional, but subsequent versions starting with Front Page Sports Football Pro '95 in 1995 included real NFL players and teams. New versions of the game were introduced each year, with the final one coming out in 1999, however, the 1999 version was recalled. A 2000 version was also planned, however it was cancelled shortly after the 1999 version recall.

In October 2009 Cyanide, the French studio behind such games as the sport management sim Pro Cycling Manager and the adaptation of Blood Bowl, announced a closed beta of a new online version of Front Page Sports Football.

== The series ==
=== Front Page Sports Football (1992) ===
The first version of the game, Front Page Sports Football, was released in 1992 for MS-DOS. It was game publisher Dynamix's first sports simulation game.

The game divides itself into three separate, but directly connected, sections: on-field action, coaching playbook, and team management. The game allows players to compete against the computer or head to head against another player and features exhibition, single season, or career/league play.

Seasons can be designed in one of five league sizes divided into one or two conferences with up to three divisions each. Seasons culminate with divisional championships, postseason playoffs, and a final Super Bowl-style showdown.

Almost every detail of a team's franchise can be customized by the owner: team name, nickname, head coach, jersey colors, playing surface, stadium type (domed or outdoor), and nearest city. The last two options also have a direct influence on weather conditions, temperature, humidity, and precipitation, which in turn affect field conditions and player performance.

Rosters and player management featured 47-man teams, complete with injured reserve, free agent pools, drafting, training camp, and trading. Players are rated from 0 to 99 in eight performance classifications. The game did not include a player editor however the gaming community had several shareware applications and utilities available for download that allowed players to edit the players themselves, or download unofficial, user-created rosters. In career leagues, potential and actual ratings could be affected by such factors as training, injuries, and aging. This added a depth of realism not seen before.

The game recorded more than 300 statistical categories that could be displayed onscreen or printed. Detailed box scores were available during and after games, as well as match-ups from the previous week. League leader stats compare all teams and players in the league in a wide range of categories.

The game also featured a playbook editor. More than 200 stock plays were included with the game and were divided among standard offensive and defensive formations. Utilizing a point-and-click drawing interface, you can easily alter any of these pre-designed plays or create your own.

The on-field/arcade play featured three skill levels that offered full or partial control of the action and coaching duties. The game supported keyboard, mouse, and dual joysticks. Your view of the action could be changed to one of nine fixed camera positions. These views, as well as a free-floating camera, also contribute to the game's extraordinary instant-replay system. Using standard VCR-style controls, you can easily view, edit, and save pivotal plays as a highlight film.

==== Reception ====
Computer Gaming World wrote that "a better debut" by Dynamix "would be hard to imagine ... the award for the best football game on the market in the first attempt ... One of the top product releases of 1992". The magazine called the graphics and rotoscoped animation "very impressive", and liked the league mode and play editor. It named Front Page Sports: Football the 1993 Sports Game of the Year.

=== Front Page Sports Football Pro (1993) ===
The second version of the game. Front Page Sports: Football Pro was the first PC football game that allowed gamers to join an online league to compete. Each week during a simulated season, league members would send their team files to a designated commissioner to simulate the games. The commissioner would run the simulation and then return updated files to owners (typically via a web page) for the next week of play. Team owners could trade players with each other, make roster moves, and function as if they were real general managers.

=== Front Page Sports Football Pro '95 ===
The third version of the game. The '95 version was available in both diskette and CD-ROM, however, there was a difference in the two versions. The diskette version includes 3,000 stock plays while the CD-ROM version comes with 10,000. There was also a diskette upgrade over the 1993 version of the game, as well as the full version.

New and updated features included:

- implementation of a new camera system that could be placed anywhere and rotated in direction (prior versions only had pre-determined, fixed camera angles).
- adaptive AI (running the same plays over and over became much less effective as the AI adapted).

In 1996, Computer Gaming World magazine named it the 11th best computer game of all-time.

=== Front Page Sports Football Pro '96 ===
The fourth version of the game. This version was the first to feature a new high-resolution graphics engine.

The '96 version crashed to the desktop and required a patch during the first release following its release. The simulation engine started to get bogged down and took much longer to simulate games than prior years.

The game received a positive review from Computer Game Review. The magazine noted that "it's difficult to conceive how this game could be made better."

=== Front Page Sports Football Pro '97 ===
The fifth version of the series was the first for Windows 95.

=== Front Page Sports Football Pro '98 ===
The sixth version of the game also showed many of the same issues as the '97 version that seemed to indicate a rushed release or poor quality control. Several of the new issues in the '98 version included a mix-up in the second-half kickoff if the coin-toss winner chose to kick; the game crashing when switching to certain camera angles; and erroneous features like the wrong type of turf in some of the stadiums. Moreover, Sierra Entertainment failed to include a player-ratings editor within the initial release. Three major patches were released during the first month of the game.

The '98 version did have a completely revamped user interface that was a significant improvement over prior years. Actual NFL player photos were introduced in the '98 version. In addition, arcade play was now available to play via multiplayer over the Internet. Audio play-by-play was also added, although it was considered lackluster. Non-NFL stadiums and cities were now available as well and a more precise weather system was also included in the new release. Teams could also create and customize their own schedules. The '98 version also had significant improvements in Internet multiplayer play in regards to stability and matchmaking.

Despite these additions, the Madden NFL franchise had evolved quite a bit and the actual arcade / gameplay aspects of the Front Page Sports series had failed to adapt or upgrade these aspects of their game. In addition, the Madden NFL franchise mode had also evolved, and while it still didn't compete with the Front Page Sports simulation engine as far as statistics, Madden NFL for many had become a superior overall game primarily due to the gameplay aspects of its franchise. The Front Page Sports series in fact were still using primarily the same graphics and player animations as in the past two releases.

=== NFL Football Pro '99 ===
The seventh and final version of the Front Page Sports Football franchise was rebranded and rebuilt to compete with the likes of the Madden NFL series that had won over so many football fans.

The graphics were completely re-tooled and supported the now-standard 3D look of most other computer games. A stadium announcer was added and the game's interface had a new updated look. The gameplay had been much improved, especially the control of the on-field action. In the past, the control had issues with responsiveness to the point that many had opted to simply call plays and allowed the computer to control the action on the field. Despite the efforts of Sierra Entertainment to improve upon these areas, the graphics and audio aspects of the game were inferior to the Madden NFL franchise.

To further compound the problems, NFL Football Pro '99 was rushed to release to meet the 1998 holiday rush in a completely unplayable state. Sierra briefly considered patching the game but then decided to abandon the series entirely in January 1999. A recall notice was issued for the game by Sierra Entertainment on January 21, 1999, and the game was pulled from the shelves. Lingering attachment to the series caused a few hard-core fans to attempt to fix the game on their own, but many turned their attention back to the 95 or 96 games.

=== NFL Football Pro 2000 ===
This version of the game was cancelled following the recall of NFL Football Pro '99. The announcement was made via a post on the Football Pro '99 user forum at Sierra's web site, where president Dave Grenewetzki explained the reasoning behind the decision to cancel the title:

"On February 22, 1999, Sierra announced a reorganization of its development divisions to more keenly focus on its key products. Four development studios were closed and many development teams will be relocated to Sierra's headquarters in Bellevue, Washington. The consolidation included Synergistic, the Renton, WA based developer of Football Pro.

Although most of the actions we took were to help us focus our resources on key products, the decision that affected the future of Football Pro was significantly different.

When I authorized the recall of the Football Pro 99 product in January, the information at hand led me to believe that the product had been released too early and that a few more months in development would give us a game we could be proud of.

Based on that, we made some positive changes to the management and composition of the team and set them off on a path to create a series of patches to the ’99 product during development of a plan for a full release of Football Pro 2000 later in the year.

Late last week, I met with the team leader and the general manager of the division to go over the status of the product. They had done a great job of identifying the issues within the game and outlining a strategy to get them fixed. Unfortunately, the schedule they outlined didn’t give us a solid chance to have the right game for the intended Football Pro 2000 release, even with an additional seven to eight months of development.

Simple patching was not going to do it. Many fundamental changes to the underlying engine were needed and there was significant risk associated with each major change. Given the (deserved) drubbing we took when we released Football Pro 99 “too early” I decided that I was not going to repeat that mistake with the release of an incomplete “2000” product.

Although discontinuing the line today is not a popular decision among Football Pro customers, I am not interested in repeating mistakes of the past. It would be a greater disservice to our customers to compromise the development of Football Pro 2000 and release the wrong game twice.

Additional announcements will be made for resolving outstanding return and reparation issues for members of the Football Pro Home Team by Thursday, March 4. Football Pro 99 was recalled on January 21, 1999, and the Home Team was established for customers that chose to keep their version of the product. All Home Team members will be given an opportunity to receive the refunds and reparations offered as a result of the recall."

David Grenewetzki - President, Sierra

== Reception ==
According to Sierra, combined sales of the Front Page Sports series, for all sports, surpassed 500,000 units by the end of March 1996.

== Influences ==
Although the Front Page Sports Football line died an ugly death, the influence of the series lingered. In addition to the way that it forced EA Sports to adopt management options in the Madden NFL series, it spawned a host of imitators. Front Page Sports Football made it possible for later football management games to thrive. Without Dynamix and Sierra Entertainment bringing franchise play and serious stat-crunching to the masses, games like Front Office Football and Action! PC Football would have been hard-pressed to build substantial followings.
