= Outpost (1994 video game) =

1994 sci-fi game

- Developer: Sierra On-Line
- Publisher: Sierra On-Line
- Designer: Bruce Balfour
- Programmers: Dan Brotherton; Randy MacNeill; Michael Lytton
- Artists: Jon Bock; Richard Powell
- Composers: Jay Usher; Mark Seibert
- Platforms: Windows 3.1x, Macintosh
- Release: 1994
- Genre: Construction and management simulation
- Mode: Single player

Outpost is a video game developed and published by Sierra On-Line in 1994. The game was noteworthy for having a hard science fiction approach, with one of the main designers being a former NASA scientist.

Outpost was released for Windows 3.1 and the Macintosh. It was followed by a loosely related sequel, Outpost 2: Divided Destiny.

== Story ==
A massive asteroid named Vulcan's Hammer is detected to be on a collision course with Earth, and all attempts to divert it from this path have failed. The last attempt, firing a large nuclear warhead at the asteroid, actually ended up splitting it not into five chunks (which would have averted disaster) as humanity hoped, but rather two asteroids. Now, instead of destroying the earth, it will simply wipe out nearly all life on Earth's surface. Extinction is not an option, and so a mission is organized to create a colony on a world elsewhere in the galaxy as the last hope for mankind's survival. The player is in charge of that mission.

== Reception ==
Initial reviews of Outpost were enthusiastic about the game. The American version of PC Gamer rated the game at 93%, one of its highest ratings ever for the time.

James V. Trunzo reviewed Outpost in White Wolf #49 (Nov., 1994), rating it a 5 out of 5 and stated that "Outpost excels in every way. It plays like a great science fiction novel reads. The graphics, sound and game play are state-of-the-art. I am extremely impressed with the game's depth and variety of approaches to problem solving. The game is also educational without being intrusive. I learned amazing (almost frightening) facts about our space program's capabilities. It was almost like looking into the future."

Following the release of the game, the game's general bugginess and perceived mediocre gameplay, along with the lack of features described in most of the game's reviews and the game's own documentation, led to a backlash against the computer game magazines of the time by consumers who bought the game based on their reviews. In 1996, Computer Gaming World stated "the design was so incomplete that many of the actions you took made no difference in the game’s outcome. Poor documentation forced players to buy the strategy guide—conveniently authored by the game’s designer—and the interface design was no help either" and also claimed that the game had been "vilified as 'the greatest screen saver of all time'". The same issue declared Outpost was the worst computer game ever released.

In a 2012 interview, Sierra On-line co-founder Ken Williams recalled the negative reception mentioning one review calling the game "Compost", while stating that Outpost "(...) wasn't actually a bad game. It looked beautiful". Williams also stated that development was delayed and over budget, costing the company a fortune.

== See also ==
- SimMars
