= Leisure Suit Larry Goes Looking for Love (in Several Wrong Places) =

1988 video game by Al Lowe

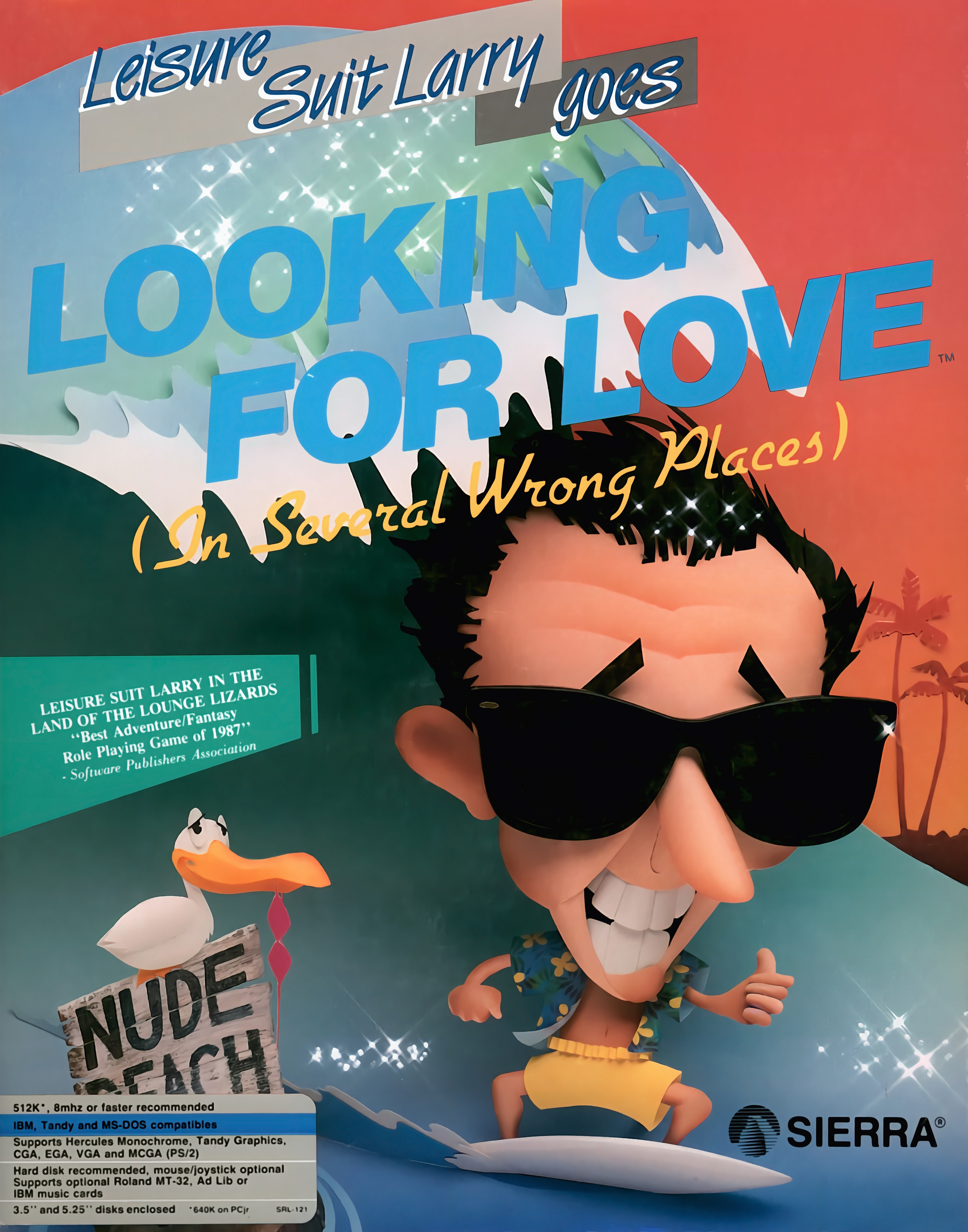
- Developer: Sierra On-Line
- Publisher: Sierra On-Line
- Director: Al Lowe
- Producer: Al Lowe
- Designer: Al Lowe
- Programmer: Al Lowe
- Artists: William Skirvin; Bonnie Borucki; Douglas Herring
- Writer: Al Lowe
- Composer: Al Lowe
- Series: Leisure Suit Larry
- Engine: SCI0
- Platforms: MS-DOS, Amiga, Atari ST
- Release: October 1988
- Genre: Adventure game
- Mode: Single-player

Leisure Suit Larry Goes Looking for Love (in Several Wrong Places) is the second game in the Leisure Suit Larry series of graphical adventure games, designed by Al Lowe and published by Sierra On-Line in 1988. Like its predecessor, Leisure Suit Larry in the Land of the Lounge Lizards, it was developed for multiple platforms, including MS-DOS, Atari ST and Amiga. It utilizes Sierra's Creative Interpreter (SCI0) engine, featuring 16-color EGA graphics and a mouse-based interface for movement. The story continues the exploits of Larry Laffer, who becomes stranded on a tropical island during an ill-fated vacation.

== Gameplay ==
Unlike the original Leisure Suit Larry in the Land of the Lounge Lizards, the game follows a linear story progression similar to Sierra's other adventure games, particularly later entries in the King's Quest series. The player character's movements are controlled via the cursor keys, the mouse or even the joystick, although a text parser is still used for all other actions. Rather than navigating through a single city, the player character is guided through a variety of puzzles and mazes. Players must take care in acquiring certain items over the course of the journey, lest they be stymied by an inescapable trap. Though there is no visible time limit, a number of pre-scripted events require players to act quickly in order to reach the next sequence.

As is standard in most Leisure Suit Larry games, the protagonist Larry Laffer's interactions with female non-player characters are accompanied by an on-screen portrait, though the images are much smaller than seen previously. The game actively punishes Larry for flirting with any woman he meets, a marked departure from the rest of the series; such acts invariably lead to Larry's violent death and a game over. Also included is a "Trite Phrase" option, which allows players to input a catchphrase which is repeated over the course of the game; the default is the notorious "Have a nice day".

== Plot ==
The opening sequence of the game finds Larry mowing the lawn of Eve, his sexual encounter from the ending of the previous game, implying the pair have remained together. However, this is quickly revealed to be an instance of an unreliable narrator, as Eve pulls into the driveway with only the vaguest recollection of who Larry is. Realizing that his affair with Eve was merely a one-night stand, a distraught Larry wanders off, winning the Lottery as well as a free vacation after stumbling into a dating game show.

During his preparations for the cruise ship, a microfilm falls into Larry's hands by mistake; this attracts the attention of the KGB, as well as the mad scientist Dr. Nonookee (a pun on "no nookie"), who both want to recover the film. On the cruise ship, Larry discovers that the woman who mistakenly chose him in the dating show let her mother go with Larry, so he makes preparations in order to escape her; he stops the ship and escapes on a lifeboat. Days later he is washed up at a resort on a Hispanophone Pacific island. As KGB agents block the way to the airport, Larry dresses up as a woman and passes through.

As the landing of the airplane will bring Larry to the agents, he opens the door and escapes the plane with a parachute. He falls in the jungle of a virgin tropical island, Nontoonyt ("None tonight"), where Dr. Nonookee has his base of operations. Passing through perils in the jungle, Larry meets Kalalau, the daughter of chief Keneewauwau, who explains to him that Dr. Nonookee prevents a company from investing on the island and develop it as a resort island. In order to marry Kalalau, Larry infiltrates the volcano and accidentally causes the death of Dr. Nonookee, liberating the native women he had hypnotized as slaves, including "Polyester Patti". In the final cutscene, Larry marries the chief's daughter, the witch doctor rejuvenates him, and he makes love to Kalalau as the volcano explodes.

Throughout the adventure there are recurring themes that contribute to the comedic effect, like visitation to identical barber shops in almost each location Larry visits; one of them is tended by Princess Rosella of King's Quest IV: The Perils of Rosella.

== Development ==
MS-DOS Screenshot

The first sequel of the series used Sierra On-Line's new adventure game engine called Sierra's Creative Interpreter (SCI), with full 320x200 resolution, mouse, and sound card support. In addition to sharing the SCI0 engine, the game parallels the King's Quest series in its realistic art style—particularly in regard to Larry's character portrait—and grand-adventure elements, including a number of diverse settings (a cruise ship, tropical islands, etc.).

Sierra On-Line intentionally toned down the titular character's sexual escapades for the sequel. According to series creator Al Lowe, this lack of Leisure Suit Larry's trademark humor is an oft-cited criticism of the game. It is also notable for being the only game in the series where Larry cannot cavort with women until the end. For this reason, the game did not include an age-verification test, although brief instances of pixelated nudity still occur at certain points. The engine also supports FM and MT-32 music.

Among the many women Larry meets over the course of the game is Rosella of Daventry—the protagonist of King's Quest IV—an example of Sierra's many cross-promotions. One of the game's final scenes includes a piano-playing "Polyester Patty", who features prominently in Leisure Suit Larry III: Passionate Patti in Pursuit of the Pulsating Pectorals and Leisure Suit Larry 5: Passionate Patti Does a Little Undercover Work under the name "Passionate Patti". Patti is blond in this incarnation, whereas future games depict her as dark-haired.

With their SCI engine, Sierra dropped disk-based protection schemes. The game has a copy protection screen where one of several pictures of women are displayed and the user must enter their phone number as given in the manual. However, some versions of the game include an undocumented way to skip this screen (as well as activating a cheat mode) by entering 0724 as the phone number (the designer Al Lowe's birthday – July 24; he put this into the game while testing so he would not need to enter the copy protection codes whenever he restarted it).

== Reception ==
Reception

Review scores
Publication	Score
Adventure Gamers	3.5/5
Adventure Classic Gaming	3/5
Amiga Action	74%
Commodore User	9/10
Computer and Video Games	90%
CU Amiga Magazine	84% (1994 re-release)

Al Lowe has said that each game in the Leisure Suit Larry franchise, including Looking for Love, sold over 250,000 copies. According to Sierra On-Line, combined sales of the Larry series surpassed 1.4 million units by the end of March 1996, before the release of Leisure Suit Larry: Love for Sail! The total sales of the first five Leisure Suit Larry games had surpassed 2 million copies by the time of Love for Sail's launch.

Leisure Suit Larry Goes Looking for Love (in Several Wrong Places) received mostly highly positive reviews upon its release, including the overall scores of 9/10 from Commodore User and 90% from Computer & Video Games. Even a 1994 re-release by Kixx earned the Amiga version an 84%.

In his contemporary review, Bob Guerra of Compute! stated that the game was a "terrific sequel to one of the best adventure games ever written" that surpassed its predecessor and was "thoroughly entertaining from beginning to end. The story is as interesting as anything you're likely to find on network television, and less predictable to boot". He praised the graphical and story details that, the magazine said, "create the illusion that you're peeking into a" living world. Retrospectively, Adventure Classic Gaming's Zack Howe opined in 2000 that while it "may not be the best game in the Leisure Suit Larry series, it is still a humorous and an entertaining title to play."

In 1991, PC Format placed the first three Leisure Suit Larry titles on its list of the 50 best computer games of all time. The editors wrote, "The three Larry games so far plumb new depths in computer entertainment — they're crude, suggestive, full of innuendo and double entendres and designed to appeal to the worst aspects of human nature — you'll love 'em."
