= Leisure Suit Larry: Box Office Bust =

2009 video game

- PAL cover art
- Developer: Team17
- Publisher: Codemasters (Note: Released under the Funsta brand name)
- Designer: Paul Dunstan
- Programmer: Paul Tapper
- Artists: Aten Skinner; Billy Allison
- Writer: Allen Covert
- Composers: Jay Waters; Oliver Wood
- Series: Leisure Suit Larry
- Engine: Unreal Engine 3
- Platforms: Microsoft Windows, Xbox 360, PlayStation 3
- Release: EU: March 27, 2009; NA: March 31, 2009; EU: April 24, 2009 (PS3); AU: April 30, 2009; NA: May 5, 2009 (PS3)
- Genre: Action-adventure
- Modes: Single-player, multiplayer

Leisure Suit Larry: Box Office Bust is an action-adventure video game developed by Team17 and published by Codemasters for Microsoft Windows, Xbox 360 and PlayStation 3. It was released on March 27, 2009 in Europe. It is the 8th game in the series, and the first Leisure Suit Larry game to be released for seventh generation consoles. It was announced on January 17, 2008 in a press release.

== Gameplay ==
Box Office Bust has open-world sandbox gameplay such as exploration, platforming, racing, and puzzle-solving. As with other games in the series, it features humor, attractive women, and suggestive themes; however, unlike its predecessor Leisure Suit Larry: Magna Cum Laude, this game does not contain nudity and sexual content despite its appeal to adult audiences. This was a decision championed by Executive Producer John Melchior, who believed that nudity was just a "mask for poor gameplay" and had stated that they (Team17) created a game with "a good solid story, clever set ups, and great pay offs."

== Plot ==
Box Office Bust features Larry Lovage, the main character of Leisure Suit Larry: Magna Cum Laude, whose uncle Larry, the original Larry Laffer, calls upon his assistance at his pornographic film studio (Laffer Studios), doing odd jobs and trying to uncover a mole from a rival studio who is attempting to sabotage Laffer Studios.

== Development ==
The game was announced by Sierra Entertainment on January 17, 2008, for release in the fall. A mobile game was also in production from Vivendi Games Mobile.

On July 29, following Vivendi Games' merger with Activision to create Activision Blizzard, the company announced that they would only publish five Sierra titles, with Leisure Suit Larry: Box Office Bust not being one of them, leaving the game in limbo. The game's publishing rights were bought by Codemasters in February 2009.

This is the second Larry game that was created entirely without any input from original Larry game designer and developer Al Lowe, though the character Big Al is a homage and caricature of Lowe.

The storyline was written by Allen Covert of Happy Madison Productions. Josh Keaton and Jeffrey Tambor star as the voices of Larry Lovage and Larry Laffer respectively. Other cast members include Covert, Artie Lange, Jay Mohr, Shannon Elizabeth, Patrick Warburton, Dave Attell, Jane Lynch, Carmen Electra, Nikki Cox, Tom Arnold, and Peter Graves. Lange, who voiced Big Al, said he was paid $30,000 for his 1.5-hour studio session. He has also stated that this installment has a higher budget than all the predecessors.

== Reception ==
Reception

Aggregate scores
Aggregator	Score
GameRankings	(X360) 26.08% (PC) 20.22% (PS3) 16.00%
Metacritic	(X360) 25/100 (PC) 20/100 (PS3) 17/100

Review scores
Publication	Score
Eurogamer	2/10
GameSpot	(PC & X360) 2.5/10 (PS3) 2/10
GamesRadar+	1/5
GameTrailers	2.3/10
IGN	2/10
Official Xbox Magazine (UK)	1/10
PC Gamer (UK)	19%
PC Zone	2.6/10
Play	24%
PSM3	1.4/10
TeamXbox	4/10

Leisure Suit Larry: Box Office Bust was met with highly unfavorable reviews. Aggregating review websites GameRankings and Metacritic gave the Xbox 360 version 26.08% and 25/100, the PC version 20.22% and 20/100 and the PlayStation 3 version 16.00% and 17/100. It is the lowest rated PlayStation 3 game on Metacritic.

Chris Walters of GameSpot described the game as "Mindless, repetitive gameplay and a truly atrocious sense of humor help Leisure Suit Larry live up to its name—it's a total bust" while Charles Onyett expressed his opinion on his review of the game on IGN as "The lowest rating numbers here at IGN are reserved for games with nearly no redeeming qualities or interesting ideas, with next to nothing enjoyable to offer players, and which under no circumstances should be purchased by anyone. Leisure Suit Larry: Box Office Bust is, without a doubt, one of those games."

GameTrailers gave the game a 2.3 out of 10, making it the lowest-rated game on the website; it also described the game as "A horrible joke in and of itself, if you buy Leisure Suit Larry: Box Office Bust the joke will be on you. We can think of a good number of other uses for your two hands; and we're using ours to give this stinker two thumbs way down."

Official Xbox Magazine (UK) gave the game a 1 out of 10, calling it an "astroturd" of a game. They also stated it was their worst-rated game of the year so far, as well as going as far as to say that it was the worst game on the Xbox 360 console thus far.

Al Lowe thanked Vivendi Games on his website for keeping him away from what he called "the latest disaster".

In PlayStation: The Official Magazine's September 2009 issue, they joked about punishing a PlayStation 3 owner's dog by making it play the Leisure Suit Larry game. The dog had urinated on his owner's PlayStation 3, which surprisingly still works.

GameSpot nominated the game for "Flat Out Worst Game of the Year" in 2009. It "lost" to Stalin vs. Martians.

Giant Bomb gave the game the Worst Game of the Year Award in 2009. Australian television show Good Game "honoured" it as the Worst Game of 2009.

Screwattack.com gave the game a SAGY award for the Worst Multiconsole game of 2009. Similarly, GamesRadar gave Leisure Suit Larry: Box Office Bust the title of the 28th worst game of all time.

== See also ==
- List of video games notable for negative reception
