= Larry Laffer =

Protagonist from the Leisure Suit Larry video game series

- Leisure Suit Larry character
- Larry Laffer in the 1991 remake of the first game (art by Terry Robinson)
- First appearance: In the Land of the Lounge Lizards (1987)
- Last appearance: Leisure Suit Larry: Wet Dreams Dry Twice (2021)
- Created by: Al Lowe
- Designed by: Mark Crowe
- Voiced by: Jan Rabson (1993–2004; 2013–2022); Jeffrey Tambor (Box Office Bust)

Larry Laffer is a player character and protagonist in the Leisure Suit Larry series of adventure video games, created by Al Lowe and Mark Crowe for Leisure Suit Larry in the Land of the Lounge Lizards in 1987 and later voiced by Jan Rabson. A man approaching middle age, Larry is a balding nerd who, following a lifelong virginity, has suddenly become obsessed with sex and now lives a new life, awkwardly trying and usually badly failing to seduce attractive women. Due to the series's popularity in the late 1980s and early 1990s, Larry was one of the well-known video game characters of that era.

== Appearances ==
In his backstory, Larry Laffer had been a nerdy geek all his life and eventually became a computer programmer. He never had close relations with friends, women, or his colleagues, and every day of his life was identical as he lived with his mother. Around his 38th birthday, his brain hit a sexual alarm and started having his first kinky thoughts, when he started reading adult magazines and could not concentrate on his work. Because of this, his life was destroyed: he was fired from his job, and upon returning home, he found his house had been sold and his mother had gone on vacation. Larry then decided to turn a page forward in his life, and he left everything to move to the city of Lost Wages (a pun on Las Vegas), where, assuming that 1970s styles were still trendy, he bought a polyester leisure suit. He sold his Volkswagen Bug to a junkyard for $94 and ended up outside Lefty's Bar, where the first game, Leisure Suit Larry in the Land of the Lounge Lizards, begins.

During the course of the series of games, Larry loses his virginity, is married twice (and dumped twice), becomes a hero of the tropical island Nontoonyt in Leisure Suit Larry Goes Looking for Love (in Several Wrong Places), and eventually, in Leisure Suit Larry III: Passionate Patti in Pursuit of the Pulsating Pectorals, meets his semi-other half, a beautiful woman known as Passionate Patti (who, for some parts of this game as well as of Leisure Suit Larry 5: Passionate Patti Does a Little Undercover Work, is controlled by the player). However, in his more recent games, Patti is absent, and Larry roams alone again. The Official Book of Leisure Suit Larry, which was written between Leisure Suit Larry 6: Shape Up or Slip Out! and Leisure Suit Larry: Love for Sail!, hints that Larry was still engaged with Patti during that period, but Al Lowe said in 1999, "I doubt Patti will return to haunt Larry again." Outside of his adventure game series, Larry appears in Sierra's Hoyle Book of Games, Volume I, The Laffer Utilities, Larry Pops Up!, Leisure Suit Larry's Casino, Leisure Suit Larry's Sexy Pinball, Leisure Suit Larry Bikini Beach Volley, the mobile game version of Love for Sail, and the online casino Larry Casino.

== Conception and design ==
Regarding Larry's male chauvinism, his designer, Al Lowe, said that Larry is intended as a satire of that type of man, rather than an endorsement of it. Lowe said he looked for an unconventional adventure game protagonist that could be "the butt of all the jokes" in a game that would not be about saving the world or rescuing princesses, but would rather deal with adult themes using humor. He recalled: "I tried to make him the opposite of a GQ model: short, overweight, balding, with comb-over hair, and so on. Larry is out of shape, losing his hair, not very successful with women, always thinking about sex – in other words, he's exactly like most guys. (...) The tough part was making Larry likable, since at first glance, he comes off as smarmy, sexist, and unlikable. I tried to make Larry resemble most guys I know: neither morons nor geniuses, basically honest and good, with a desire for more sex than they actually get. Men relate to Larry because no matter how big a loser you are, you're not as bad off as Larry!"

In Lowe's words, Larry was "modeled after a salesman for [Lowe's game company] Sierra On-Line that shall remain nameless. He would return from a sales trip and brag to us about how much ass he had gotten. Those of us sitting there coding hated him." While making Leisure Suit Larry in the Land of the Lounge Lizards, Sierra On-Line staff had to decide the character's name. They agreed that he should be named after a certain Jerry (Lowe never made his last name known to the public), who had visited him at work and became well known in the Sierra studios. Jerry thought of himself as a great lover and became an infamous point of comical reference among the staff, so the game creators agreed that since Jerry's character suited the game's protagonist, they should jokingly tribute him. However, since they thought it would be immoral to use a real person's full name as a comical reference, "Jerry" was then altered to "Larry", a similar name, in honor of injury attorney Larry H. Parker, a childhood friend of Lowe. Lowe had to find a new surname, and having in mind the many L-words of the title, skimmed through the 'L' volume of an encyclopedia to find a suitable word or name. He fell on the entry of Arthur Laffer, and the name caught his attention due to its phonetic resemblance to 'laugher'. Arthur Laffer, for years, had no idea about the existence of the games until much later, when Lowe sent a letter asking his permission for the publication of a program under the title The Laffer Utilities, a Larry spin-off which could potentially confuse the public due to the ambiguous title. Laffer asked his secretary if she knew about the games, and she told him that she had played them for years, but never made a connection. Laffer gave permission and also paid a visit to the Sierra studios.

One of Larry's trademarks is his manner of introducing himself: "Hi, my name is Larry; Larry Laffer", a reference to James Bond's introduction style, "My name is Bond; James Bond". The "Leisure Suit" part came from Al Lowe's statement to Sierra founder Ken Williams that the series' predecessor Softporn Adventure was so dated that it should be wearing a leisure suit. The rest of his look includes "a Hawaiian shirt, a gold medallion, and a chest toupee because [Lowe] wanted him to be as out of it as possible." Originally, Larry was a typical 16-colored sprite, although on box covers he was seen as a cartoon with huge triangular head and nose. Lowe said about Larry's nose: "When we started, [Sierra artist] Mark Crowe gave me a choice: Larry could have either a huge nose or no nose because with only 160 pixels horizontally, his 'nose pixel' could be either on or off. Later, as graphics developed, Larry's look became more refined, but always in keeping with his loser image." As technology advanced to allow more cartoon-like graphics, the VGA games updated the sprite to resemble the depiction of Larry on the covers. In the latter games with full voice-over soundtrack, Larry is voiced by actor Jan Rabson in all games except Leisure Suit Larry: Box Office Bust, where he is voiced by Jeffrey Tambor.

== Reception ==
Though feminists have complained about Leisure Suit Larry, it is their opponents among the opposite sex who should be offended. Sure, Larry looks at women as sex objects. But [...] unlike James Bond and so many fictional womanizers, Larry repulses women rather than seduces them.

— The Seattle Times in 1995

According to Zero in 1992, Larry Laffer has been "a favourite among PC users for years" and GameSpot later recalled how Larry's personality flaws helped to "turn the unappealing antihero into a cash cow" for Sierra On-Line at the time. In 1995, Next Generation stated that "It's widely believed that Larry (Leisure Suit and all) is the most widely played computer game character ever, thanks to the game's early introduction, its multitude of sequels, and good old-fashioned piracy." Lowe said "Sierra surveyed Larry players and found that they strongly match the gameplaying population in general, with one exception: A higher proportion are women! My theory is that women relate to Larry because at least once they've all dated a jerk like him."

German magazine PC Games ranked Larry sixth on their 2002 list of the best game characters of all time, as "nobody fails as funny as Al Lowe's notorious adventure hero." Retro Gamer included him in their 2004 list of top 50 game heroes, noting that "after several episodes, Larry is still as balding and hapless as ever, but he's just never going to stop on his endless quest for lurve." He was voted the 45th top video game character of all time in a 2011 online poll on the website of Guinness World Records Gamer's Edition.

Arcade magazine ranked him sixth on their top list of "videogame characters who live for the thrill of the chase" in 2000 and ScrewAttack placed him third on their 2010 list of the gaming's top perverts in gaming. Complex ranked him as the third top "really ugly good guy" in 2011, as well as second among top "pervs in video games" in 2012. In 2012, Zoomin.TV ranked him as number one pervert in games, ScrewAttack placed him as sixth on their list of top "hoes of gaming" and GamesRadar included him among the "13 unluckiest bastards in gaming". In 2013, Game Informer called him "one of gaming's more infamous characters, at least among the people who still remember him by name," and Complex gave him their "Mr. Thirst" award for the most lustful video game character of all time.

Larry made a homage-type cameo appearance in the Spaceballs: The Animated Series episode "Grand Theft Starship" and was referenced by Charles Stross in Asimov's Science Fiction. A "lecherous" octopus at the Seattle Aquarium was named after the character.

== Bibliography ==
- Lowe, Al; Roberts, Ralph (1994). The Official Book of Leisure Suit Larry. Compute! Books. ISBN 978-0-87455-215-7.
- Mueller, Michael; Schuchardt, Martin (1990). The Leisure Suit Larry Story. Grand Rapids, MI: Abacus. ISBN 978-1-55755-086-6.
