= Leisure Suit Larry 5: Passionate Patti Does a Little Undercover Work =

1991 video game

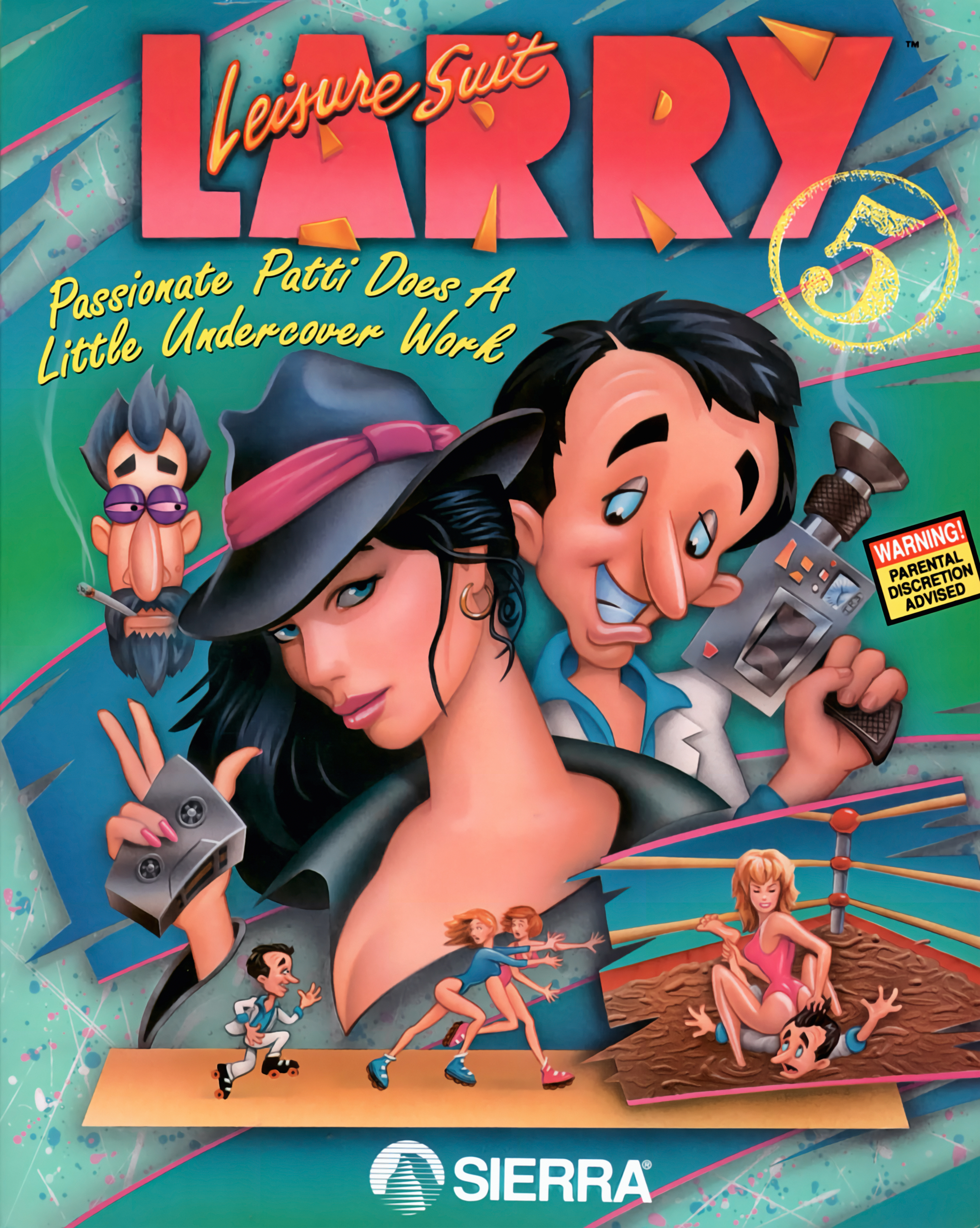
- Developer: Sierra On-Line
- Publisher: Sierra On-Line
- Directors: Al Lowe; Bill Davis (creative)
- Producer: Guruka Singh Khalsa
- Designer: Al Lowe
- Programmer: Brian K. Hughes
- Artist: Jane Cardinal
- Composer: Craig Safan
- Series: Leisure Suit Larry
- Engine: SCI1
- Platforms: MS-DOS; Amiga; Macintosh; Windows
- Release: September 7, 1991
- Genre: Adventure game
- Mode: Single-player

Leisure Suit Larry 5: Passionate Patti Does a Little Undercover Work is a graphical adventure game developed and published by Sierra On-Line for the Amiga, MS-DOS, and Macintosh computers in 1991. It is the fourth entry in their Leisure Suit Larry series and the first Larry title to have 256-color graphics and a fully icon-based interface. Being an (in)direct sequel to 1989's Leisure Suit Larry 3, its title is misleading, as there is no Leisure Suit Larry 4. The game is followed by Leisure Suit Larry 6 in 1993. It was re-released in 2017 on Steam with Windows support.

== Gameplay ==
Leisure Suit Larry 5 expands on the multi-character feature of the previous installment, with control periodically passing between the protagonists Larry and Patti. A difference in the interface is that it includes the "Zipper" icon, enabling the character to perform an erotic action.

The overall difficulty is greatly reduced in comparison with past games; neither character can become trapped or die, and losing the game is impossible. Many of the items players collect on their journey are merely optional, only triggering alternative solutions and affecting the final score, but not the game's progress.

== Plot ==
Screenshot showing the game's graphics and Hollywood setting

The absence of a Leisure Suit Larry 4 forms the game's premise: Julius Biggs has stolen the "missing floppies" and caused Larry Laffer to become amnesiac. Larry awakens working as a videotape technician at PornProdCorp, a sleazy entertainment company transitioning from adult films to mainstream television. His manipulative boss, Silas Scruemall, assigns him a cross-country mission: travel across America with a hidden camera to record three finalist women for their new TV show America's Sexiest Home Videos.

Meanwhile, FBI Inspector Desmond recruits pianist Passionate Patti for an undercover operation. The Bureau suspects organized crime has infiltrated the entertainment industry through subliminal messages embedded in rock music and rap recordings. Patti must investigate Des Rever Records in Baltimore and K-RAP Radio in Philadelphia, allegedly controlled by criminal enterprises.

Larry's journey takes him to three women across the country. In New York City, he encounters Michelle Milken, a junk bond dealer who seduces him, then steals his money and credit cards. Atlantic City brings him to Lana Luscious, a professional mud wrestler he meets on the boardwalk. His final stop in Miami introduces him to Chi Chi Lambada, a dental hygienist and former gymnast.

Patti's investigation uncovers evidence of subliminal messaging techniques and documents exposing connections to organized crime. Both investigations converge on Julius, who controls both the music industry infiltration Patti is tracking and the television production company that employs Larry.

On his way back to Los Angeles, Larry is involved in an airplane incident, lands the plane safely, and is greeted as a hero. He is invited to the White House by George H. W. Bush, where he is reunited with Patti.

== Development ==
Following Leisure Suit Larry III (1989), designer Al Lowe initially believed the series would end as a trilogy. Lowe and Sierra On-Line president Ken Williams then explored turning Larry into an online, multiplayer adventure. In early 1991, Lowe and a small team began work on Leisure Suit Larry 4, intended as the first Sierra Network online adventure. They built custom modem- and server-based code (code-named "Facemaker" and a waiting-room system) to let players create avatars and interact in real time. The project hit technical roadblocks due to dial-up speeds and graphics bandwidth limitations, and Larry 4 was abandoned.

With no viable Larry 4, Lowe joked that the next game would be "Larry 5" instead of 4, and the series adopted the in-joke that Larry 4 never existed: Larry 5 picks up the story without retelling the fourth episode. Lowe later explained that skipping over "4" freed him from the constraints of continuing Larry and Patti's happily-ever-after, and that the question, "What happened to Larry 4?", intrigued players.

Larry 5 was developed using the new Sierra Creative Interpreter (SCI1), which supported 256-color VGA graphics and a point-and-click interface, and Lowe's team redrew every scene in VGA. Replacing the text parser with a mouse-driven icon bar made puzzles easier to solve, as players no longer had to guess specific commands; the team added puzzles and interactions to compensate, along with the "Zipper" icon.

Sierra's internal surveys showed that many adventure players never finished games due to difficult obstacles, and Larry 5 was designed to be more forgiving than their previous offerings, with easier puzzles and no deaths or dead ends. The game retained the dual-protagonist structure of Larry 3.

Production was led by producer Guruka Singh Khalsa, with Lowe as writer/director and Bill Davis as creative director. The team completed the game in 1991 for MS-DOS, Amiga, and Macintosh platforms. Leisure Suit Larry 5 was released in September 1991.

== Reception ==
Reception

Review scores
Publication	Score
Computer Gaming World	"thoroughly enjoyable game"
The One for Amiga Games	

The game sold 125,000 copies within a month. Al Lowe has said that each game in the Leisure Suit Larry franchise, including Leisure Suit Larry 5, sold over 250,000 copies. According to Sierra, combined sales of the Larry series surpassed 1.4 million units by the end of March 1996, before the release of Leisure Suit Larry: Love for Sail! The total sales of the first five Leisure Suit Larry games had surpassed 2 million copies by the time of Love for Sail!'s launch.

Computer Gaming World called Leisure Suit Larry 5 "a thoroughly enjoyable game".
