= Leisure Suit Larry 6: Shape Up or Slip Out! =

1993 video game

- MS-DOS cover art for Leisure Suit Larry 6
- Developer: Sierra On-Line
- Publisher: Sierra On-Line
- Director: Al Lowe
- Designer: Al Lowe
- Programmer: Carlos Escobar
- Artist: Bill Skirvin
- Writer: Al Lowe
- Composer: Dan Kehler
- Series: Leisure Suit Larry
- Platforms: MS-DOS, Windows, Macintosh
- Release: December 1993
- Genre: Adventure
- Mode: Single-player

Leisure Suit Larry 6: Shape Up or Slip Out! is the fifth entry in the Leisure Suit Larry series of graphical adventure games published by Sierra On-Line and is a sequel to the 1991 video game, Leisure Suit Larry 5: Passionate Patti Does a Little Undercover Work. Originally developed for MS-DOS in 1993, an enhanced CD-ROM version was published a year later.

The plot continues the exploits of series protagonist Larry Laffer, who has won a free trip to a luxurious health spa populated by women. It includes revamped graphics in SVGA resolution and voice acting, a first for the series. The game is followed by Leisure Suit Larry: Love for Sail! in 1996. The game was re-released in 2017 on Steam with support for Windows.

== Gameplay ==
The lobby area of La Costa Lotta

This installment focuses more on conversations with women and puzzles than on the storyline. The entire game is spent at La Costa Lotta. There are plenty of traditional inventory-based puzzles to solve in the game. Larry can die, but the player is allowed to try again every time that happens, without the need to restore a saved game. The icon interface is similar to other Sierra games of the time, but unlike most Sierra games, the icon bar is visible at all times. The icons are more or less the same as Leisure Suit Larry 5, but now the standard “Use” command has been divided into “Use” and “Pick Up”.

The game's difficulty has been relaxed when compared to earlier titles, it is impossible to get stuck without the proper items, and although there are death scenes, you can immediately reverse your actions, so death scenes are more of an entertainment purpose. The point of the game is to meet and try your luck with all the women in La Costa Lotta. These tasks can be done in any order except for the last one. Each of these encounters will provide Larry with an object which he can offer to Shamara Payne, after which the game ends.

== Plot ==
Larry Laffer is once again single at the outset of the game, as his girlfriend Passionate Patti is off doing her own thing (she is mentioned only briefly by the narrator at one point in the game, and appears in the calendar with the game). After competing—and losing—on the television dating show Stallions, Larry gets an all-expenses-paid trip to La Costa Lotta, a refined health spa. Due to his status as non-paying guest, he is treated rudely by the staff and given the worst room on the premises. Larry would later find himself assisting a variety of women with various tasks.

Larry meets and eventually helps Gammie lose weight by figuring out how to start a weight-loss treatment machine, but he gets left after she feels far too pretty for Larry. Larry would also meet Shablee, and after finding and giving her an evening gown, she leads Larry to an evening date by the beach. The night ends after Larry realizes she's a trans woman. At one point he meets Cavaricchi and Burgundy, and after helping them, he gets invited to a sauna with the two of them but eventually ends up being left out. Larry later on meets Char and after gathering some items for her, gets asked into a room where he eventually gets electrocuted by a machine, he wakes up the next day in his room. He encounters a woman called 'Thunderbird' in the resort's weights room and acquires a pair of handcuffs for her, leading to a night of humiliation by Thunderbird, now revealed to be dominatrix.

Larry meets Merrily and she tells Larry about her dream to bungee jump from a nearby tower in the hotel, after Larry finds the key to the Bungee Tower door they both go up to get ready to jump but Larry mistakenly falls off the tower and later wakes up in his room. Eventually, Larry acquires all the required items to give to Shamara, he goes to a balcony in the hotel and speaks with Shamara. He gives her all the items and she eventually becomes happy with Larry. The game ends with both of them presumably having sex.

== Development ==
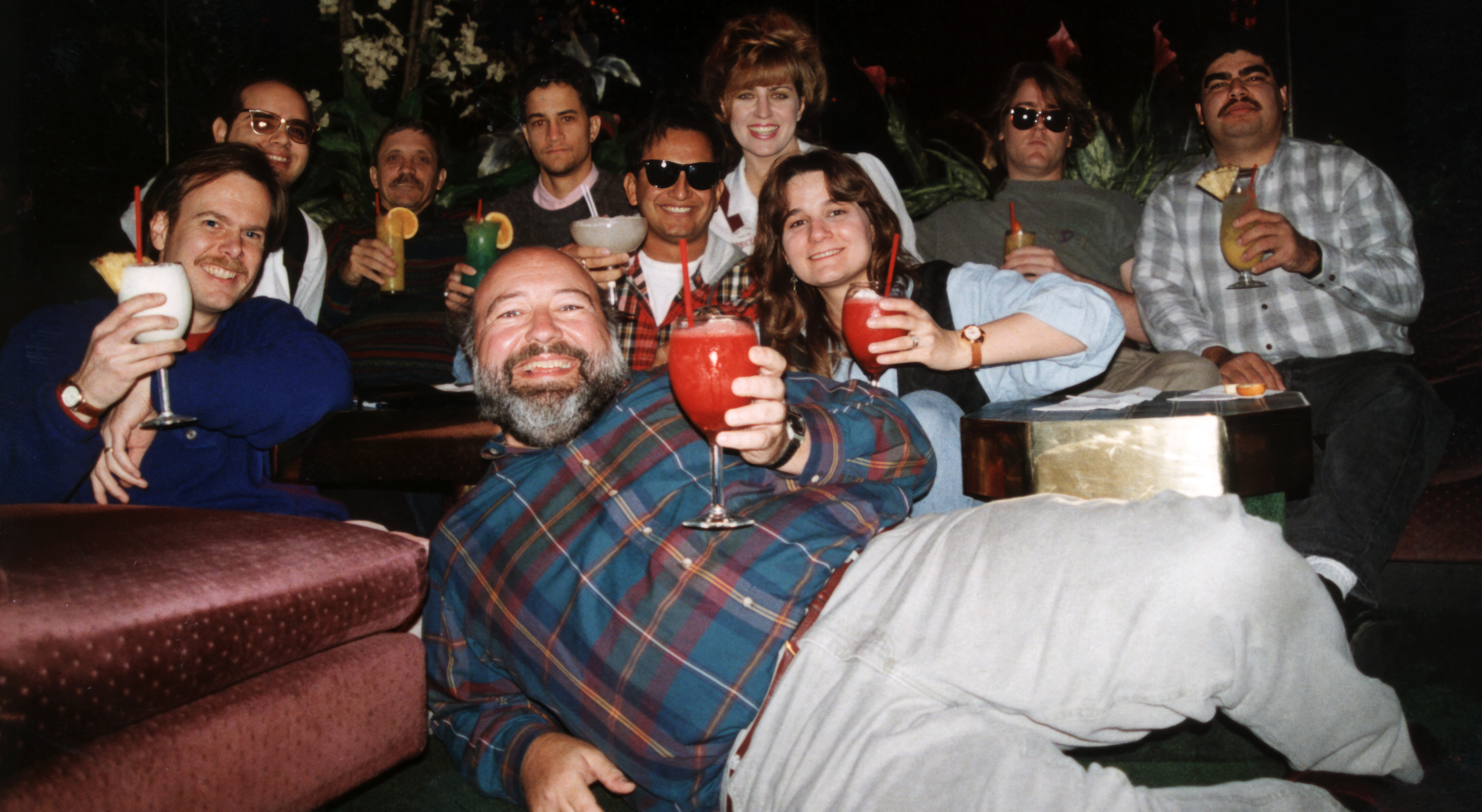
Al Lowe and members of the Leisure Suit Larry 6 development team.

The game featured an improved video and sound quality, and also returned to the earlier Sierra philosophy of "punishing" wrong moves with the player's death. However, the deaths were only for humor's sake, as a "Try Again" button allowed the player to reverse the mistake. In at least one case, however, the player could reach a dead end from which the game could not be completed.

The original disk VGA version’s interface uses the same fonts and menus as the older SCI0 games, in a bit of a nostalgic callback. Unlike the other SCI1 titles, which hide the icon selections at the top of the screen, the lower part is taken up by the icons, with quick access to your inventory. Retail versions were distributed in English or German versions, and in collection Leisure Suit Larry's Greatest Hits & Misses a Polish version was also present.

== CD version ==
It was the first Larry game to be released as a CD edition with dubbing, and the SVGA mode with better graphics and higher resolution (640x480) compared to the floppy version (320x200). The VGA mode with lower resolution was also included in the CD edition.

The SVGA version changes up the interface a bit by enlarging the lower section and sticking in a text box, along with the character portraits, so the dialogue and messages no longer appear on the main screen. The inventory has been moved to the top of the screen.

== Reception ==
Reception

Review scores
Publication	Score
Hyper	50%
Joystick	72.5/100
Next Generation	3/5
PC Gamer (UK)	83%

The game's review by Allen Greenberg of Computer Gaming World in 1994 called it "a very clever game that will easily offend the puritan-minded, just as it might offend the experienced gamer looking for a serious puzzle challenge." He summarized, "For the novice who enjoys a touch of risqué entertainment and good, off-color jokes, Leisure Suit Larry 6 is a very novel and enjoyable source of titillation and amusement."

Next Generation reviewed the Macintosh version of the game in 1995, rating it three stars out of five, and stated that "This sixth Larry installment is filled like a straining brassiere with dozens of the most ghastly come-ons, puerile sexual innuendos and brutal rejections ever assembled on a CD-ROM you might accidentally buy for your kid - but it's strictly PG-rated stuff, of course, and it's all in good, chauvinistic fun."

James V. Trunzo reviewed Leisure Suit Larry VI: CD-ROM Version in White Wolf #49 (Nov., 1994), rating it a 3 out of 5 and stated that "Leisure Suit Larry VI is an enjoyable, mildly sexist game with its tongue firmly planted in cheek. If you enjoy double entendre, suggestive themes and teasing graphics, you should enjoy this product. The humor is timely, and the game plays smoothly. If you want something serious, look elsewhere."

Leisure Suit Larry 6 debuted at #6 on PC Research's computer game sales chart for the month of November 1993. It placed variously in sixth and seventh for the next three months. Al Lowe has said that each game in the Leisure Suit Larry franchise, including Leisure Suit Larry 6, sold over 250,000 copies. According to Sierra On-Line, combined sales of the Larry series surpassed 1.4 million units by the end of March 1996, before the release of Leisure Suit Larry: Love for Sail!
