= Leisure Suit Larry III: Passionate Patti in Pursuit of the Pulsating Pectorals =

1989 video game by Al Lowe

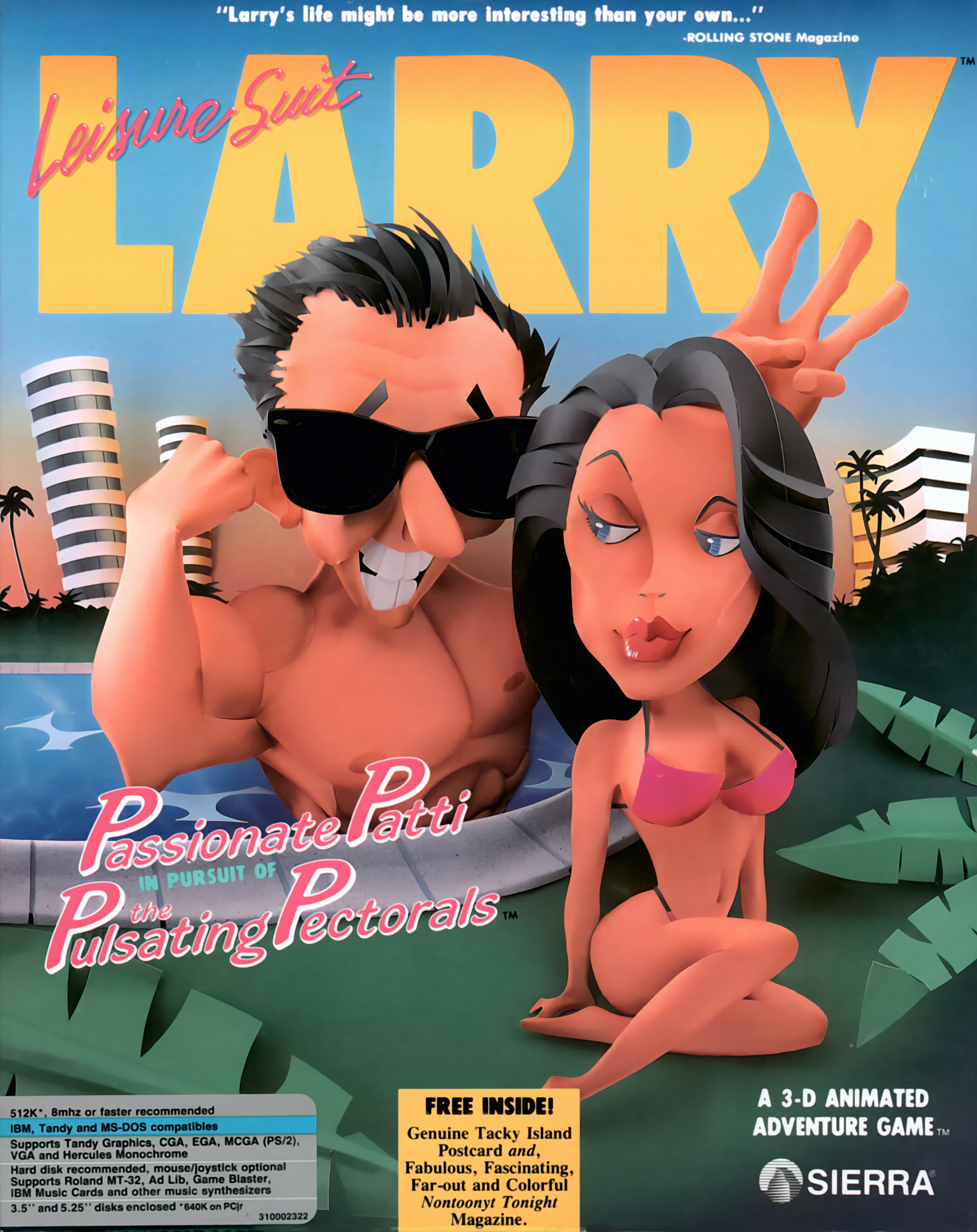
- Cover art by Mark Crowe
- Developer: Sierra On-Line
- Publisher: Sierra On-Line
- Producer: Al Lowe
- Designer: Al Lowe
- Programmers: Al Lowe; Carlos Escobar
- Artists: William Skirvin; Roger Hardy Jr.
- Composer: Mike Dana
- Series: Leisure Suit Larry
- Engine: SCI0
- Platforms: MS-DOS; Amiga; Atari ST
- Release: November 1989
- Genre: Adventure
- Mode: Single-player

Leisure Suit Larry III: Passionate Patti in Pursuit of the Pulsating Pectorals is a graphical adventure game designed by Al Lowe and published by Sierra On-Line for MS-DOS, Atari ST, and Amiga in 1989 as the third entry in their Leisure Suit Larry series. The plot first follows series protagonist Larry Laffer, fresh from an abrupt divorce, as he combs through a tropical resort looking for love. After he meets the latest woman of his dreams, Passionate Patti, and leaves her to enter the wilderness, the player takes control of Patti to search for him.

== Gameplay ==
The later part of the game, when control passes to Patti

The game utilizes Sierra's Creative Interpreter (SCI0), resulting in a graphic style similar to its immediate predecessor, 1988's Leisure Suit Larry Goes Looking for Love (in Several Wrong Places). The controls feature a mouse-based interface and a text parser for directing the player characters' actions.

The game takes place on Nontoonyt Island, the tropical setting from the previous game which has since been transformed into a resort. Like the city setting of Leisure Suit Larry in the Land of the Lounge Lizards, the island has several areas and is fully explorable at the game's start.

Littered throughout the resort are the series' main protagonist Larry Laffer's potential mates; whenever the player interacts with these women, they are featured in a close-up portrait, once again echoing the first game in the series. The basic structure of the game involves Larry presenting each woman with gifts, although none of these items require money to obtain, unlike in the original Leisure Suit Larry.

Leisure Suit Larry III features a second playable character, the eponymous "Passionate Patti", over whom the player briefly assumes control. Patti's portion of the game is much the same as Larry's, including multiple "death" scenes and a detailed character portrait of her love interest, a male stripper. However, the Patti sequences are more reminiscent of traditional adventure games, requiring players to navigate through a maze as well as collect items for use in later puzzles.

=== "Filth Level" ===
As was the case with Leisure Suit Larry in the Land of the Lounge Lizards, the game begins with a series of tongue-in-cheek questions to which the authors reasoned only adults would know the answer. As before, however, this process can be skipped by pressing Ctrl-Alt-X. The number of questions answered correctly determines the game's "Filth Level", which displays itself on a scale from 1 to 5: The lowest level (Mother Goose) bars players from viewing any of the game's titillating scenes; alternatively, the highest level (Totally Raunchiest) leaves all instances of nudity intact. Although the game contains several instances of nudity, none of Larry's sexual encounters are shown explicitly. The Filth Level also determines the default expletive which is repeated throughout the game (however players are also given the option to edit it and put their favorite expletive).

== Plot ==
The story begins five years after the events of Leisure Suit Larry Goes Looking for Love (in Several Wrong Places). Following Larry's victory over Dr. Nonookee, the tropical island of Nontoonyt has become a resort reminiscent of Honolulu, Hawaii. Larry has settled into a high-paying job in "Natives Inc." and lives in a luxurious house with his wife, Kalalau (the daughter of the tribal chief from the previous game). Larry's current boss is Kalalau's father (now a development mogul, who changed his name from "Chief Keneewauwau" to "Chairman Kenneth"). After years of marital bliss, Larry's union comes to an abrupt end when Kalalau dumps him—for another woman—and soon finds himself out of a job as well. With this news, Larry retreats into a phone booth (a nod to Superman) and swaps his aloha shirt for his signature white suit, firmly announcing his return to the swinger lifestyle.

The female characters include Tawni, a topless sunbather who is more interested in souvenirs than dating Larry; Cherri Tart, a showgirl who performs at the casino; Suzi, an attorney of law firm "Dewey, Cheatem & Howe" willing to finalize Larry's divorce proceedings; Bambi, an aerobics instructor; and Passionate Patti, a jazz pianist in the hotel (the character appeared in the previous game under the name "Polyester Patty"). Larry's attempts to seduce each of these women are, in typical Larry fashion, doomed to failure—until he meets Patti, who can be won over if Larry collects the right items and performs the right actions based on his encounters with the others.

Ultimately, Larry and Patti spend the night together, but after a round of passionate sex, Larry hears Patti mumble the name of her previous partner (whom she intends to leave) as she drifts to sleep. Dejected, Larry abandons his new lover, eventually becoming lost in the uncharted jungle surrounding the resort area. It is at this point, the game shifts perspectives; the player now controls Patti, who must navigate the hostile terrain and assorted perils of the jungle (usually by removing parts of her clothing in the process) to find Larry and resolve the misunderstanding.

The final act of the game sees Larry and Patti get captured by lesbian cannibals. In an example of breaking the fourth wall, the pair escapes captivity through the use of a "magic marker"... only to end up at Sierra's Coarsegold, California headquarters (realized in-game as a literal movie studio), where they must make their way through various set pieces from other Sierra games, including Police Quest and Space Quest II. This sequence includes many self-aware jokes which are prevalent in Sierra games. At its conclusion, Larry interrupts Sierra programmer Roberta Williams as she is "directing" the whale escape scene from King's Quest IV. (Note: Williams herself was featured on the box art of Softporn Adventure, a 1981 Apple II text adventure which served as the basis for the original Leisure Suit Larry title.)

The game ends with Larry offered a job at Sierra, and the couple are seen living in a California log cabin; Larry is coding an aptly titled series of computer games based on his adventures.

== Development ==
With Leisure Suit Larry III, Sierra decided to return to the adult-oriented themes, which were almost absent from Leisure Suit Larry Goes Looking for Love (In Several Wrong Places). The artistic style of the game's characters (particularly Larry) are more cartoony and exaggerated than in the previous game, which opted for a realistic approach. The instruction manual which was packaged with the game resembles a tourist manual, with several "advertisements" which function as codes for passing Sierra's copy protection. There is a larger repertoire of MIDI music as compared to the previous game.

== Reception ==
Reception

Review scores
| Publication | Score |
|---|---|
| Adventure Gamers | 4/5 |
| Adventure Classic Gaming | 5/5 |
| Amiga Action | 82% |
| Games International | 8/10 |

Award
| Publication | Award |
|---|---|
| Game Player's PC Strategy Guide | Excellence Award |

Al Lowe has said that each game in the Leisure Suit Larry franchise, including Leisure Suit Larry III, sold over 250,000 copies. According to Sierra On-Line, combined sales of the Larry series surpassed 1.4 million units by the end of March 1996, before the release of Leisure Suit Larry: Love for Sail! The total sales of the first five Leisure Suit Larry games had surpassed 2 million copies by the time of Love for Sail's launch.

In the May 1990 edition of Games International, Theo Clarke commented that front-loading the credits at the start of the game by inserting them into an opening sequence that cannot be skipped "makes Leisure Suit Larry III seem slow at first." However he noted that once past the opening, "the game nips along with unusual flair." Clarke thought that this game had "more flaws than its ancestors". He criticized the soundtrack as "intrusive", and thought the total possible score of 4000 was too large "which devalues the sense of achievement associated with scoring the points for trivial extras." He also believed that the increased complexity of this sequel meant that "responses are often less precise than they were." Clarke concluded by giving the game a rating of 8 out of 10 for both gameplay and graphics, saying, "Sierra's consistently high standards create an expectation of quality that I simply do not expect other companies to match."

Leisure Suit Larry III won an "Excellence Award" from the editors of Game Player's PC Strategy Guide. In 1991, PC Format placed the first three Leisure Suit Larry titles on its list of the 50 best computer games of all time. The editors wrote, "The three Larry games so far plumb new depths in computer entertainment — they're crude, suggestive, full of innuendo and double entendres and designed to appeal to the worst aspects of human nature — you'll love 'em."

In 1994, PC Gamer US named Leisure Suit Larry III as the 37th best computer game ever. The editors wrote, "It's very funny, offers plenty of game play, and even lets you experiment with gender swapping. How can you beat that?"
