= Troll's Tale =

1983 video game

- Developer: Sunnyside Soft
- Publisher: Sierra On-Line
- Designer: Al Lowe
- Programmers: Al Lowe; Dave Scrunton (Atari); Peter Oliphant (IBM PC)
- Platforms: Apple II, Atari 8-bit, Commodore 64, IBM PC
- Release: 1983
- Genre: Adventure
- Mode: Single-player

Troll's Tale is an adventure video game developed in by Sunnyside Soft and published by Sierra On-Line for the Apple II in 1983. It uses the same engine for Sunnysoft's earlier game Dragon's Keep. Sierra acquired the game from Sunnysoft, along with Dragon's Keep and Bop-A-Bet by April 1983, and appointed Nancy Anderton to manage the publishing of their educational games. Peter Oliphant converted the games for the Atari 8-bit computers, Commodore 64 and, as a self-booting disk, IBM PC compatibles. Coleco made a deal with Sierra planning to release the game on ColecoVision with a Super Game Module.

The game came packaged with a paper map, showing an incomplete layout of the game and stickers to mark the treasure locations.

== Gameplay ==
A troll has taken sixteen treasures from the Dwarf King and has hidden them around his lands. The game is very straightforward, since the player doesn't require any mapping skills. Commands and movements are done using single keys on the keyboard.

Sierra recommended the game for second and third graders.
