= Leisure Suit Larry: Love for Sail! =

1996 video game

- Developer: Sierra On-Line
- Publisher: Sierra On-Line
- Director: Al Lowe
- Producer: Mark Seibert
- Designer: Al Lowe
- Programmer: Steve Conrad
- Artists: Jason Zayas (animation); Jason Piel (backgrounds); Layne Gifford (lead backgrounds)
- Writer: Al Lowe
- Composer: Frank Zottoli
- Series: Leisure Suit Larry
- Engine: SCI3
- Platforms: MS-DOS; Windows; Mac OS
- Release: MS-DOS and Windows: NA: November 26, 1996; EU: 1996; Apple Macintosh: NA: January 18, 1997
- Genre: Adventure
- Mode: Single-player

Leisure Suit Larry: Love for Sail! is an adventure game originally developed and published by Sierra On-Line in 1996. It was the sixth and final Leisure Suit Larry entry game written by series creator Al Lowe, and the last to feature original protagonist Larry Laffer as the main character until the release of Leisure Suit Larry: Wet Dreams Don't Dry in 2018. It followed the 1993 Leisure Suit Larry 6: Shape Up or Slip Out!.

After many of the Leisure Suit Larry games had gained a reputation for not actually featuring all that much raunchy content when analysed, Love for Sail! included more risqué elements compared to previous installments. It also featured more fleshed-out, cartoon style graphics than its predecessors, as well as full voice acting. A mobile game of the same title was also released by Vivendi Games Mobile in 2007. The next game in the series to be released was 2004's Leisure Suit Larry: Magna Cum Laude.

== Gameplay ==
Players can "appear" in the game by placing voice samples of selected dialogue and a digitized photo in a particular directory (the default is Al Lowe). Due to time constraints, the information to do so was not printed in the manual, but was published some time later in an online announcement.

Love for Sail! also provides a more-literal-than-usual interpretation of Easter eggs: when certain obscure actions are performed, a small icon resembling an Easter egg flashes in a corner of the screen. This usually indicates that a "seduction" scene can now be played featuring nudity that is normally obscured.

The game also shipped with a "CyberSniff 2000", a sheet of numbered scratch-and-sniff paper, corresponding to a number displayed on the screen at a certain location, so that the player can get a scent of what the area the player character is in smells like.

== Plot ==
Love for Sail! is the first Larry game since the third to pick up immediately where its predecessor left off; in typical fashion, it features Larry getting dumped by the woman who represented the ultimate goal of Larry 6, Shamara.

The formula is much the same as the previous games; the "twist" is that Larry was a passenger on a cruise ship populated by parodies of famous people. Among the other cruise guests are "Drew Baringmore" (Drew Barrymore), "Dewmi Moore" (Demi Moore), "Victorian Principles" (Victoria Principal), "Jamie Lee Coitus" (Jamie Lee Curtis), "Nailmi" and "Wydoncha Jugg" (Naomi and Wynonna Judd) and "Annette Boning" (Annette Bening).

The plot revolves around Larry's attempt at winning a weekly contest held on the ship by Captain Thygh, a gorgeous blonde. The contest involves a series of games varying from legitimate sports competitions like bowling to more erotic things like a machine created to test one's sexual prowess. Each passenger is given a score card with a selection of the various competitions to compete in, and the passenger with the highest cumulative score at the end of the week wins. The prize is an additional free week on the cruise with Captain Thygh in her cabin (and, presumably, her bed).

Larry comes up with a variety of ways to cheat in the assigned competitions so that he can get the highest score and win the contest. Among Larry's chosen competitions are a cooking contest, a "best dressed" contest, a game of horseshoes, bowling, the sexual prowess contest and others. At times Larry wins these contests not by cheating but only by an unexpected twist of fate triggered by his (often unintentional) actions. For instance, Larry's encounter with fashion designer Jamie Lee Coitus causes his leisure suit to become the height of fashion; as such he wins the best dressed competition.

After a series of contests that Larry wins, he goes back accidentally naked to his room in the stern of the ship and a mysterious woman (Annette) comes to him and asks him to kill her husband, but he mistakenly believes that she is asking him to have sex with her. Larry arrives at night in her husband's room, and he unknowingly goes to bed in the dark with what he thinks is the woman and plays around with "her", but only finds out after the lights are turned on that it was her ailing husband, and he has a heart attack because of Larry. Annette then gives Larry some stock for a crude oil shipping company. Later, Larry continues to play and win all the contests and eventually goes to Captain Thygh's room and meets her, he happily comes to her, awaiting a week with her but she disgustedly rejects him. Larry then gives her the stock he got from Annette, which makes her happy and they presumably have sex. The ship sails into the sunset as the credits roll. After the credits have rolled, it is abducted by an alien spaceship.

== Development ==
Leisure Suit Larry: Love for Sail! was originally announced under the title Leisure Suit Larry 7: Yank-her's Away!. According to creator Al Lowe, the development team were initially planning to make the game with live action full motion video, "but what we found out was, we're writing cartoons here... if we did straight video, it becomes not only ludicrous, but obscene [laughs]... We were going over the list of gags we had and just said, 'oh no, you couldn't even do this with blue screen!' ... what we came back to was that we liked what we'd done in the past and we want to do that even more."

This was the first Leisure Suit Larry game to receive an ESRB rating (Mature) upon its original release. Lowe acknowledged that the game was considerably more risqué than previous installments of Leisure Suit Larry but maintained that the focus was on the humor rather than the nudity or sexual content, and that the game would not appeal to those looking for pornography.

The game contained English, Spanish, French, German, Italian, Russian and Polish languages. Polish version had problem with typing diacritical letters in console.

Commenting on a puzzle in which Larry must push on a door, despite guns coming out of the wall implying that he shouldn't touch it, producer Mark Seibert recounted that "all of us knew that was a bad puzzle, and that we shouldn't be putting it in, but it made for a big joke and so we left it. Sure enough, people have written me about it all the time and say, 'Hey! That was a stupid puzzle!'" [emphasis in original].

Similar to Leisure Suit Larry 5: Passionate Patti Does a Little Undercover Work, it is impossible for the game to be placed in an "unwinnable" state by a bad decision.

== Mobile version ==
A mobile version by Mighty Troglodytes titled Leisure Suit Larry: Love for Sail (minus the exclamation mark of the PC version) was released by Vivendi Games on June 21, 2007, featuring a completely different plot to the original.

== Reception ==
Reception

Review scores
Publication	Score
CNET Gamecenter	3/5
GameSpot	6.7/10
Next Generation	3/5
Computer Games Strategy Plus	4/5
MacUser	3/5
PC Games	A−

A reviewer for Next Generation criticized the game's puzzles and re-introduction of a text parser: "Now, we kind of miss text parsers, but combining one with point-and-click results in a game that's neither fish nor fowl, adding an element of pure guesswork to a puzzle set that's already conceptually slippery. Beyond this, the game's other big flaw is that the series hasn't really gone anywhere - much like its main protagonist, it seems stuck in a perpetual adolescence." However, he concluded that the game has enough strong moments to appeal to fans of the series. GameSpot complimented the game's challenge and hint system, but found that the raunchy humor quickly grew tiresome. The game was also reviewed by Danny Wallace in the January 1997 edition of PCGamer (UK) magazine and was given a score of 23%, described the game as "a pointless mountain of toss".

Richard Cobbett writing a Larry retrospective for Rock Paper Shotgun in 2011 opined the game was "a really good, very underrated adventure". That same year, Adventure Gamers named Love for Sail the 71st-best adventure game ever released.

According to Al Lowe, sales of Love for Sail surpassed 280,000 units by early 1999. In 2006, he remarked in an interview that it had ultimately sold "750,000 copies plus many more in the various Larry collections."

== Ports and re-releases ==
The game was included as Leisure Suit Larry 7 in the Leisure Suit Larry: Ultimate Pleasure Pack compilation by Sierra Studios, released in 1999. On February 19, 2013, Codemasters re-released the game to be downloadable on GOG.com for Microsoft Windows and OS X pre-packed with DOSBox. The game was then released on Windows downloadable on Steam on 22 December 2017. On April 26, 2018, the Windows build was updated to support ScummVM 2.0. A Linux version pre-packed with ScummVM was released on May 15, 2018. On August 2, 2019, the macOS build was updated to support ScummVM 2.0.
