= Leisure Suit Larry: Wet Dreams Don't Dry =

2018 video game

- Developer: CrazyBunch
- Publisher: Assemble Entertainment
- Series: Leisure Suit Larry
- Platforms: Microsoft Windows, macOS, Nintendo Switch, PlayStation 4, Xbox One
- Release: Microsoft Windows, macOS: WW: 7 November 2018; Nintendo Switch, PlayStation 4: WW: 13 June 2019; Xbox One: WW: 15 September 2020
- Genre: Adventure
- Mode: Single-player

Leisure Suit Larry: Wet Dreams Don't Dry is an adventure video game developed by German studio CrazyBunch and published by Assemble Entertainment for Microsoft Windows, macOS, Nintendo Switch and PlayStation 4. The game is set during the 21st century and follows Larry as he attempts to navigate the world of online dating in order to meet up with his latest dream girl. An Xbox One version was released on 15 September 2020.

A sequel, Leisure Suit Larry: Wet Dreams Dry Twice, was released on October 23, 2020 for Microsoft Windows and macOS, and also planned to release for Nintendo Switch, PlayStation 4 and Xbox One in 2021.

== Plot ==
The game begins with Larry waking up in a dark room, unaware of where he is or what is happening. He leaves the room via an elevator that places him in front of Lefty's, where he realizes that the landscape has dramatically changed. Inside the bar Larry talks to Lefty, who tells him that he has been missing for about thirty years and that much has changed in his absence, even as Larry has seemingly not changed at all, with the exception of him being thinner. Briefly taken aback, Larry nevertheless resolves himself to chasing women.

Soon after, Larry discovers a Pi phone in Lefty's bathroom, which tells him that it is an experimental prototype and that it must be returned to Bill "BJ" Jobs at Prune headquarters. In doing so he meets and attempts to woo Faith, BJ's beautiful assistant, who states that she only dates men with a perfect score on the dating app Timber. Gaining a new Pi phone as a reward for returning the prototype, Larry sets about meeting various people via the Timber app in search of a perfect score. This task leads him to various people such as a lawyer seeking access to Prune's files and eventually results in Larry following Faith and BJ to Cancúm, where he breaks into BJ's mansion. He then discovers that Faith is the true genius behind Prune and that she hired BJ to serve as its male figurehead, as she states that the business would not have thrived if it was known a woman was behind everything. The game ends with Larry escaping capture and accidentally blowing up the mansion, resulting in Faith getting shipped out to sea. Prior to the close of the game, Larry receives more matches on Timber.

== Development ==
The game is not a parody of any known title; it is commonly assumed that the game's name is a parody of the 2014 adventure game D4: Dark Dreams Don't Die, but the developers did not confirm this when asked. Al Lowe, creator of the original Leisure Suit Larry games, was not involved with the game and prior to its release stated that he was unimpressed with the game's title. In anticipation of the game's release, CrazyBunch released a three-part documentary about the making of Wet Dreams Don't Dry to YouTube.

== Reception ==
Leisure Suit Larry: Wet Dreams Don't Dry received mixed reviews. The PC version has a score of 72% on Metacritic based on 18 reviews, while the Switch version has a score of 52% based on 9 reviews, indicating "mixed or average reviews" for both. The game received praise from outlets such as Adventure Gamers and Destructoid, both of which felt that the game was an enjoyable addition to the Leisure Suit Larry series. ScreenRant was generally favorable towards the game, but commented that the game's puzzles could occasionally confuse players. Player Attack and Common Sense Media were both critical of Wet Dreams Don't Dry, with the former criticizing the game's story and gameplay.
