= Leisure Suit Larry: Wet Dreams Dry Twice =

2020 video game

- Developer: CrazyBunch
- Publisher: Assemble Entertainment
- Series: Leisure Suit Larry
- Platforms: Microsoft Windows, macOS, Nintendo Switch, PlayStation 4, Xbox One, iOS, Android
- Release: Microsoft Windows, macOS: WW: October 23, 2020; Nintendo Switch, PlayStation 4, Xbox One: WW: May 18, 2021; iOS, Android: WW: January 25, 2022
- Genre: Adventure
- Mode: Single-player

Leisure Suit Larry: Wet Dreams Dry Twice is an adventure video game developed by German studio CrazyBunch and published by Assemble Entertainment for Microsoft Windows, macOS, Nintendo Switch, PlayStation 4, Xbox One, iOS, and Android as the latest entry in the Leisure Suit Larry series to feature Larry Laffer as the main protagonist. The game is a direct sequel to Leisure Suit Larry: Wet Dreams Don't Dry and follows Larry as he attempts to reunite with Faith, the woman he fell in love with and lost during Wet Dreams Don't Dry. The Microsoft Windows and macOS version was released on October 23, 2020, and the Nintendo Switch, PlayStation 4 and Xbox One versions were released on May 18, 2021. The game was ported to iOS and Android devices on January 25, 2022.

The game is notable for being the last performance of long-time Larry Laffer voice actor Jan Rabson in a Leisure Suit Larry game prior to his death in October 2022.

== Plot ==
Following the events of Wet Dreams Don't Dry, Larry is stranded in Cancúm and being forced to marry the chief's daughter. However, Larry still mourns for and misses Faith, who was last seen drifting out to sea. Larry realizes that Faith is his true love, and he must find her at any cost and make amends for the mistakes he made with her in Wet Dreams Don't Dry. He escapes Cancúm and becomes shipwrecked in the Kalau’a archipelago. With the help of his PiPhone and its artificial intelligence, Pi, Larry explores the islands of the archipelago. He learns that Faith was seen in the area, and as he follows her path through a series of quests, he discovers that she is now the leader of a cannibalistic tribe of women who eat men, and that she has lost her memory. Larry then goes on further quests around the islands to restore Faith's memory. Meanwhile, Prune's new CEO Mr. Wang and his assistant Nari also want to find Faith, as she was working on a self-learning algorithm that Wang wants to incorporate into a new android, the PiBot, for his own nefarious means. Pi discovers Faith's algorithm and it slowly starts to incorporate itself into Pi.

Faith reveals that she has not lost her memory, but instead wanted to avoid Larry due to his previous actions. Larry convinces Faith that he truly loves her, but they are captured by Wang. Pi gets uploaded into the prototype PiBot, which turns on Wang and kills him. As the PiBot, Pi realizes that she has romantic feelings for Larry, and she traps him inside of a virtual reality world resembling an early Larry video game where his everyday dreams come true with the events of each day repeating over and over, and he is married to Pi, who now calls herself Piper. Faith helps Larry to escape the virtual world and Piper is shut down for good. Faith and Larry return to Cancúm and get married.

== Production ==
Wet Dreams Dry Twice was initially stated for launch on Windows PC and macOS on October 15, 2020, but was postponed until October 23 for unknown reasons.

== Reception ==
Reception

Aggregate scores
Aggregator	Score
Metacritic	(PC) 73/100 (NS) 78/100
OpenCritic	50% recommend

Review scores
Publication	Score
Adventure Gamers	(PC) 4.5/5
Push Square	(PS4) 6/10

Leisure Suit Larry: Wet Dreams Dry Twice received "mixed or average" reviews for Windows and "generally positive" reviews for Switch, according to review aggregator Metacritic. Fellow review aggregator OpenCritic assessed that the game received fair approval, being recommended by 50% of critics.

Antal Bokor with Third Coast Reviews commented in his review "Leisure Suit Larry: Wet Dreams Dry Twice is a good adventure game. It's not really very funny to me—but its constant stream of sex jokes didn't get tiresome, either. I imagine it's the same sort of desensitization that happens to those who work in shops that sell pornography and sex toys—and it's exactly that desensitization that makes the humor fall a little flat." Catherine Dellosa with TechRaptor rated the game a 6.5 out of 10 and ended her review stating "if you're looking to immerse yourself in the whole Larry Laffer experience, it's not going to be as wild as you might think. But if you're just here to play a colorful point-and-click game that doesn't take itself too seriously, then it's a great way to pass the time when you want to take a quick break from the other games in your to-be-played pile."
