= Softporn Adventure =

1981 video game

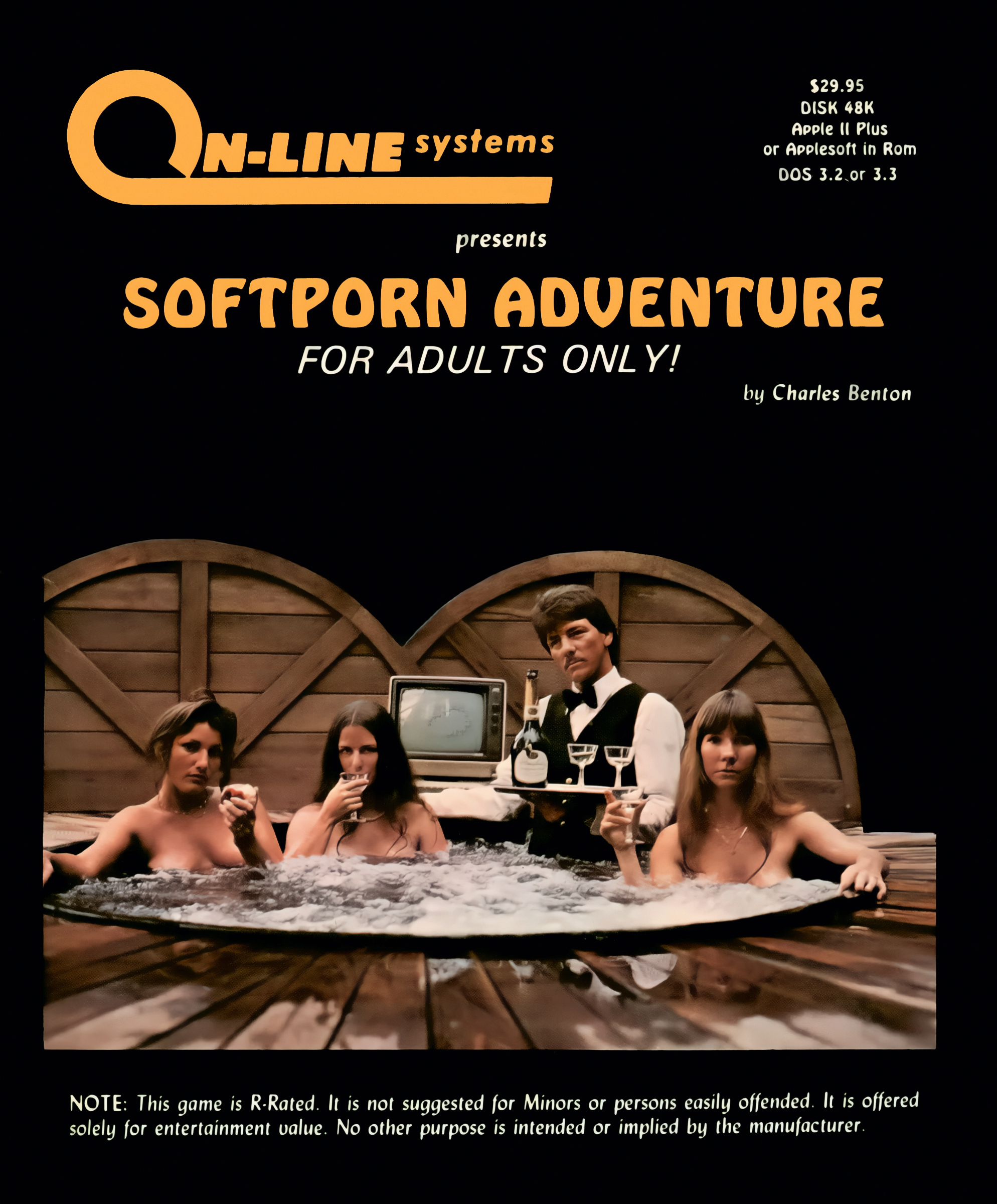
- Developer: Blue Sky Software
- Publisher: On-Line Systems
- Designer: Chuck Benton
- Platforms: Apple II, Atari 8-bit, MS-DOS, FM-7, PC-88, PC-98, Sharp X1
- Release: NA: Spring 1981; JP: 1986
- Genre: Interactive fiction
- Mode: Single-player

Softporn Adventure is a comedic, adult-oriented text adventure game produced for the Apple II in 1981. The game was created by Charles Benton and released by On-Line Systems, later renamed Sierra On-Line. Years later, Softporn Adventure was remade and expanded as the Leisure Suit Larry series of adult-oriented video games, and the first entry in that series, 1987's Leisure Suit Larry in the Land of the Lounge Lizards, was a nearly direct graphical adaptation of Softporn Adventure. Another graphical version was released as Las Vegas for various Japanese computers in 1986 by Starcraft.

== Gameplay ==
In the game, the player (playing a down-on-his-luck party animal) searches for certain items that will allow him to win the affections of three beautiful (and sometimes not-so-beautiful) women. The game takes place in the 21st century in a city called "Lost Vagueness". Players can gamble at a casino, playing either blackjack ("21") or slot machines to earn the money needed to persuade the women. The game requires manual adult keyboard input to access offensive content beyond the initial gameplay. Benton claimed that parts of the game were based on his own life, but did not specify which ones.

== Development ==
Softporn Adventure was originally written for the Apple II in Applesoft BASIC in 1981 by programmer Chuck Benton. Benton programmed the game as an exercise to teach himself programming on the Apple II. He did not initially intend to promote the game commercially. Benton's friends enjoyed the game and encouraged him to self-publish it. Sometime in 1981, Benton was selling his game at a trade show where he encountered Ken Williams, co-founder and President of On-Line Systems (later known as Sierra On-Line). Williams eventually decided to release the game as part of On-Line Systems' catalog.

== Advertising ==
The game's box cover and advertisements feature three nude women and a male waiter in a hot tub, shot at Ken and Roberta Williams's home. From left to right in the hot tub are Diane Siegel, On-Line's production manager; Susan Davis, On-Line's bookkeeper and the wife of Bob Davis, the creator of Ulysses and the Golden Fleece; Rick Chipman, an actual waiter from a local restaurant, The Broken Bit; and Roberta Williams. The ad was considered somewhat scandalous at the time because of the degree of nudity displayed. The photographer was Brian Wilkinson, a local newspaper editor and acquaintance of Ken Williams. Wilkinson shot several dozen takes before arriving at the image finally used for the cover, but only a few of them still exist.

== Release and media coverage ==
The photo accompanying Time's article was of the Softporn Adventure advertisement. United Press International also covered the game's release. Although Benton's mother and On-Line Systems' Coarsegold, California, neighbors disliked the game's erotic content, and the company received hate mail, the positive and negative publicity helped sell an estimated 50,000 copies, an unusually large number, especially at a time when Apple had only sold a couple of hundred thousand Apple II microcomputers. Because computer stores did not want to order only one game from On-Line they purchased other software with it; Williams estimated that Softporn temporarily doubled On-Line's sales. Benton's own romantic life also reportedly improved.

Softalk, which covered Apple hardware and software products and had close ties to important advertiser Sierra, published the hot tub advertisement in September 1981. For the next year, the magazine published numerous letters to the editor debating the morality and appropriateness of the ad; the magazine stated that three times as many readers supported publishing it as opposed the ad.

Softporn was withdrawn from sale after a few months. Customers asked for a version for women, but Benton could not find a female collaborator. He worked on other Sierra games until leaving the company in 1985 to found Technology Systems, Inc.

== Reception ==
Softline called the Atari version of Softporn "a refreshing change of pace from the average software game" but criticized its sexism, noting the inability to seduce men and reporting that "the parser does not recognize the word woman". The magazine stated that the game "reinforces the notion that all computer freaks are emotionally underdeveloped high school and college boys", but nonetheless concluded that it "is hopelessly addicting ... it's just a shame that [the author] didn't take the time to make his program a bit classier".

The French magazine Jeux & Stratégie praised the embedded gambling mechanics, particularly noting that the blackjack feature is "a success," where players "really feel like you're playing." Despite the seedy subject matter, the reviewer was impressed by the puzzle design and mechanics.

The Dirty Book rated the game "X-tatic", essentially 3 of 4 stars, calling it a "challenging adventure with a twist".

== Legacy ==
In 1986, after Sierra lost a Disney license, Al Lowe suggested that Sierra, who owned the rights of Softporn Adventure, remake it with the improved tools now at their disposal, and Ken Williams agreed. Lowe then used the puzzles of Softporn Adventure for creating Leisure Suit Larry in the Land of the Lounge Lizards. Lowe reportedly came up with the name "Leisure Suit Larry" after remarking that Softporn was "so outdated that it ought to be wearing a leisure suit".

Also in 1986, a Japanese company Starcraft released a graphical version of Softporn Adventure titled Las Vegas. It was released for FM-7, PC-88, PC-98, and Sharp X1.

In 1991, Softporn Adventure was also ported by Gary Thompson to Microsoft C for IBM PC compatibles. Thompson loved Softporn Adventure in 1981, so he printed out the source code and archived it. In the late 1980s, he re-designed and re-wrote it for the PC and released it on CompuServe. In 1991, after purchasing a copy of Leisure Suit Larry in the Land of the Lounge Lizards, he realized it was the same game. After contacting Lowe, the designer of Leisure Suit Larry, he obtained permission from Ken Williams and Lowe to release his re-designed PC version as shareware on the Internet. Williams said he would allow Thompson to release his Softporn on the internet because, as he wrote, "Quite frankly, I seriously doubt it will affect the sales of Larry."

In 1994, Thompson got an email from Lowe, graciously requesting his permission (since the rights were already owned by Sierra anyway) to release Thompson's PC version on a collector's edition of LSL called Leisure Suit Larry's Greatest Hits and Misses. The company requested his version because Thompson's Softporn was the only version available for the PC that completely held true to the original game. Thompson updated and re-wrote the game again. This bug-fixed version was then released on Sierra's collector's edition CD-ROM.

The source code of an Apple II (Applesoft BASIC) and of the CP/M (Pascal) versions is available on the web. The IBM PC version was also released later as freeware by Lowe on his webpage.
