= Leisure Suit Larry: Magna Cum Laude =

2004 video game

- Cover art for Leisure Suit Larry: Magna Cum Laude, featuring the uncut version
- Developer: High Voltage Software
- Publisher: Vivendi Universal Games (Note: Published under the Sierra Entertainment label.)
- Producer: Joshua VanVeld
- Designers: Duncan McPherson; Tom Smith
- Programmer: Brian Bilicki
- Artists: Damion J. J. Davis; David Leung
- Series: Leisure Suit Larry
- Platforms: PlayStation 2, Windows, Xbox
- Release: NA: October 5, 2004; EU: November 5, 2004
- Genre: Adventure
- Mode: Single-player

Leisure Suit Larry: Magna Cum Laude is a 2004 adventure video game developed by High Voltage Software and published by Vivendi Universal Games and their subsidiary Sierra Entertainment. It is the seventh main installment in the Leisure Suit Larry series and the first game in the series without any involvement with series creator Al Lowe and the final game to be released by Sierra before the rights were sold to Codemasters following its parent company Vivendi Games' merger with Activision to form Activision Blizzard. The game introduces a new main character, Larry Lovage, as Larry Laffer's nephew.

== Gameplay ==
Magna Cum Laude has an open world where Larry can walk about campus and interact with students and personnel on the premises. In this mode, Larry can search for hidden money or tokens, strike poses to impress girls, and take photos which can later be sold to collectors. At several locations on campus a minigame can be entered, usually by "activating" an object or a person (starting a conversation). The player must win most of the minigames in order to advance. Minigames started by a conversation usually increase the affection of one of the girls; other minigames can provide money or increase "confidence".

The game originally received an "Adults Only" rating from the ESRB and was subsequently edited to receive a more commercial "Mature" rating in the United States and Canada. In Europe, the game was released unedited on all three systems and featured a disclaimer on the packaging highlighting that it was "uncut". The unedited version was eventually released in North America under the title Leisure Suit Larry: Magna Cum Laude—Uncut and Uncensored!. The major difference between the two North American releases is that the uncut and uncensored version contains full frontal nudity and sex scenes, although there is very little of the latter and it is mostly implied rather than depicted. Both versions were refused classification by the OFLC and effectively banned in Australia.

The game contained English, Spanish, French, German, Italian, Russian and Dutch languages.

== Plot ==
The main protagonist, Larry Lovage, is a student at Walnut Log Community College whose purpose is to get on a dating TV show called "Swingles". Uma Yasmine, the hostess of the show, won't allow Larry on the show until he proves his seductive wits by obtaining "tokens of affection". Sixteen college girls will conveniently be at his disposal. His aging uncle, Larry Laffer from the original games, provides brief advice and appears at a local bar.

After going through several rounds on the dating show and obtaining tokens, Larry becomes a finalist and goes on a date at a strip club with three girls. Larry will choose one out of the three whom he gets to bring back to his room. The game ends with Larry partying in college during Spring Break with the entire school.

== Development ==
In 2003, Sierra Entertainment announced that the Leisure Suit Larry franchise was being revived with a seventh game, called Leisure Suit Larry: Magna Cum Laude. This is the first game in which Al Lowe is not involved in any way, as this game was created by game developer High Voltage Software, Inc. On his website, Lowe talks about how he was in talks with Sierra about working with them on the game, but they stopped contacting him, as they went into downsizing. Later he received a letter from a writer on the game, where it was revealed that the game had long since been written by the time he entered discussions with Sierra.

The new Larry game does not star Larry Laffer, but a new character: his nephew, Larry Lovage. There are numerous homages to the earlier Larry games: Larry Laffer is the tutorial guide and giver of questionable advice for Larry Lovage; Larry's computer is playing Leisure Suit Larry 4: The Missing Floppies ("the best game of its time"); and secret tokens featuring the likeness of the Where's Dildo? character from Larry 7 can be collected. The loose storyline of the game is that Larry wants to appear on a dating TV show called Swingles, but he must prove his worth before he is allowed on air.

== Reception ==
Reception

Aggregate score
Aggregator	Score		
Aggregator	PC	PS2	Xbox
Metacritic	59/100	60/100	62/100

Review scores
Publication	Score		
Publication	PC	PS2	Xbox
Electronic Gaming Monthly	N/A	2.5/10	2.5/10
Eurogamer	N/A	7/10	N/A
Game Informer	N/A	7.5/10	7.5/10
GamePro	N/A	N/A	3.5/5
GameRevolution	D−	D−	D−
GameSpot	7.2/10	7.1/10	7.1/10
GameSpy	2.5/5	2.5/5	2.5/5
GameZone	6.1/10	7/10	7.2/10
IGN	7.2/10	7.2/10	N/A
Official U.S. PlayStation Magazine	N/A	2.5/5	N/A
Official Xbox Magazine (US)	N/A	N/A	2.3/10
PC Gamer (US)	39%	N/A	N/A
Detroit Free Press	N/A	N/A	2/4

Reviews of the game were mixed, with some praising the game for its humor but panning it for its gameplay. Many critics also took the game to task for its sexual content and humor being too direct and obvious, citing that much of the charm of the series has been in its more subtle handling of the dirty jokes and sexual situations, focusing more on double entendres than actual foul words and hints at nudity rather than full-on bare breasts. Al Lowe denounced Magna Cum Laude vigorously, emphasizing on his website that he took no part of its creation after being promised a role in its creation.

It was nominated for GameSpot's annual "Funniest Game" award, which went to Grand Theft Auto: San Andreas.
