= Winnie the Pooh in the Hundred Acre Wood =

1984 video game

Winnie the Pooh In The Hundred Acre Wood
- Developer: Sierra On-Line
- Publishers: NA: Sierra On-Line; EU: U.S. Gold
- Designer: Al Lowe
- Artists: Mark Crowe; Doug MacNeill; Jennifer Nelsen; Terry Pierce
- Series: Winnie the Pooh
- Platforms: Apple II, Commodore 64, MS-DOS, Atari ST, Amiga, TRS-80 Color Computer
- Release: December 1984
- Genre: Adventure
- Mode: Single-player

Winnie the Pooh in the Hundred Acre Wood is a single player adventure game created by Al Lowe for Sierra On-Line, originally released in 1984 for the Commodore 64 and Apple II. It is based on Disney's Winnie the Pooh franchise.

== Gameplay ==
The Hundred Acre Wood is populated with characters from A. A. Milne's Winnie the Pooh series of short stories.

Each character has lost an item of value to them and wanted the item returned. The player moves through the Hundred Acre Wood and collects the missing items then returns them to their rightful owners. Only one item can be carried at a time, so picking up one item means leaving behind of whatever item is currently being carried. Some screens have interactive sub-elements. For example: the player could "climb" Pooh's tree and see the limb where he kept his honey pots safely out of the reach of flood waters (a reference to a scene in the Disney animated featurette Winnie the Pooh and the Blustery Day and Chapter 9 of the first Winnie the Pooh book). The game has no animation in the mode of a traditional Quest game such as King's Quest. Rather, the Hundred Acre Wood existed as a grid of connected static screens. Players move between the screen using the arrow keys and can only move North, South, East or West. The missing items are randomly assigned at the start of each new game to screens within this grid, although the various characters can always be found on the same screens. When an item is "dropped" on a screen in order to "pick up" another item, the dropped item stays on that screen until the user returns to retrieve it later, but not all items belong to one of the characters - for example, a board belongs to the bridge. "Dropping" an item also returns it to the character it belongs to; if the character is not correct the game will let the player know.

Reuniting a character with their item results in a celebration screen, and a congratulatory party takes place once all 10 items have been successfully returned.

At random points, the items can be lost if the player runs into Tigger (who bounces them and makes the player drop what they are carrying), or when the wind starts again, mixing up any remaining objects that haven't yet been returned.

== Reception ==
Antic's reviewer, eight years old, agreed with Winnie the Pooh's box's description of the game teaching reading and map-reading skills, but was unsure about logical thinking because "it is usually obvious who the things belong to". She approved of the Atari ST version, including replayability.

== See also ==
- List of Disney video games
- List of Sierra Entertainment video games
