= Bop-A-Bet =

1982 video game

- Developer: Sunnyside Soft
- Publishers: Sunnyside Soft (1982); Sierra On-Line (1983)
- Designers: Margaret Lowe; Rae Lynn McChesney
- Programmer: Al Lowe
- Artist: Mike McChesney
- Platform: Apple II
- Release: 1982
- Genre: Educational

Bop-A-Bet is a 1982 educational video game developed and published by Sunnyside Soft for the Apple II. It was subsequently also published by Sierra On-Line. The game teaches letter recognition and alphabetization. The speed of the game increases as the user becomes more proficient.

== Reception ==
Bob Proctor reviewed four educational games for Computer Gaming World, and stated that "In terms of simplicity, three of these four games can be used by the age groups for which they were intended. Bop-A-Bet would also qualify except for those questions at the start which set up the game. However, you also have to ask yourself if your children (or students) can be entrusted with the only copy of a $30 to $40 disk."
