= Leisure Suit Larry =

Video game series

- Cover art for the 1997 collection
- Genre: Graphic adventure
- Developers: Sierra Entertainment, High Voltage Software, Team17, Replay Games, CrazyBunch
- Publishers: Sierra Entertainment, Codemasters, Replay Games, Assemble Entertainment
- First release: Leisure Suit Larry in the Land of the Lounge Lizards; July 5, 1987
- Latest release: Leisure Suit Larry: Wet Dreams Dry Twice; October 23, 2020

Leisure Suit Larry is an adult-themed sex comedy video game series created by Al Lowe. Drawing inspiration from Softporn Adventure, the Leisure Suit Larry series centers on Larry Laffer—a middle-aged man known for his balding head, penchant for double entendre, and iconic leisure suits. The stories typically focus on his unsuccessful attempts to seduce young women, portraying him as an unsuccessful pickup artist. A common link between the games are Larry's explorations of luxurious and cosmopolitan hotels, ships, beaches, resorts, and casinos.

The series became notable for its blend of humor, parody, and sexual fantasy, a departure from the norm in Sierra's otherwise family-friendly catalog. Under Lowe’s creative direction, the franchise launched its first six games between 1987 and 1996, becoming a cult classic. Following a hiatus, the series was revived with new installments overseen by a variety of development teams without Lowe's involvement. As of 2011, the series has sold 10 million copies. Sierra co-founder Ken Williams describes Leisure Suit Larry as the company's best-known franchise.

== History ==
Al Lowe on programming the monorail in Larry II (Interview 1989)

=== Original series ===
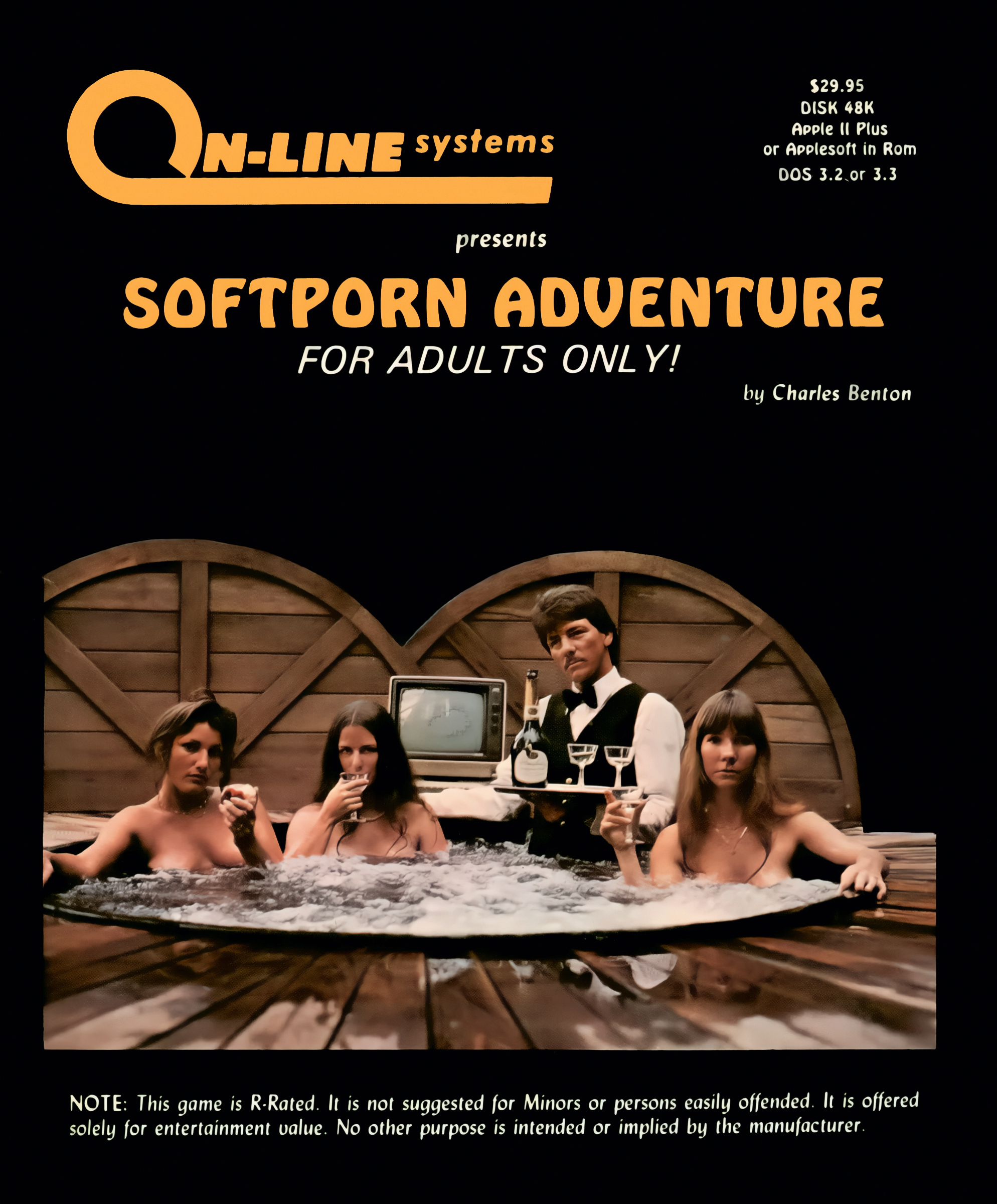
Softporn Adventure (1981), the text-based game that inspired Leisure Suit Larry

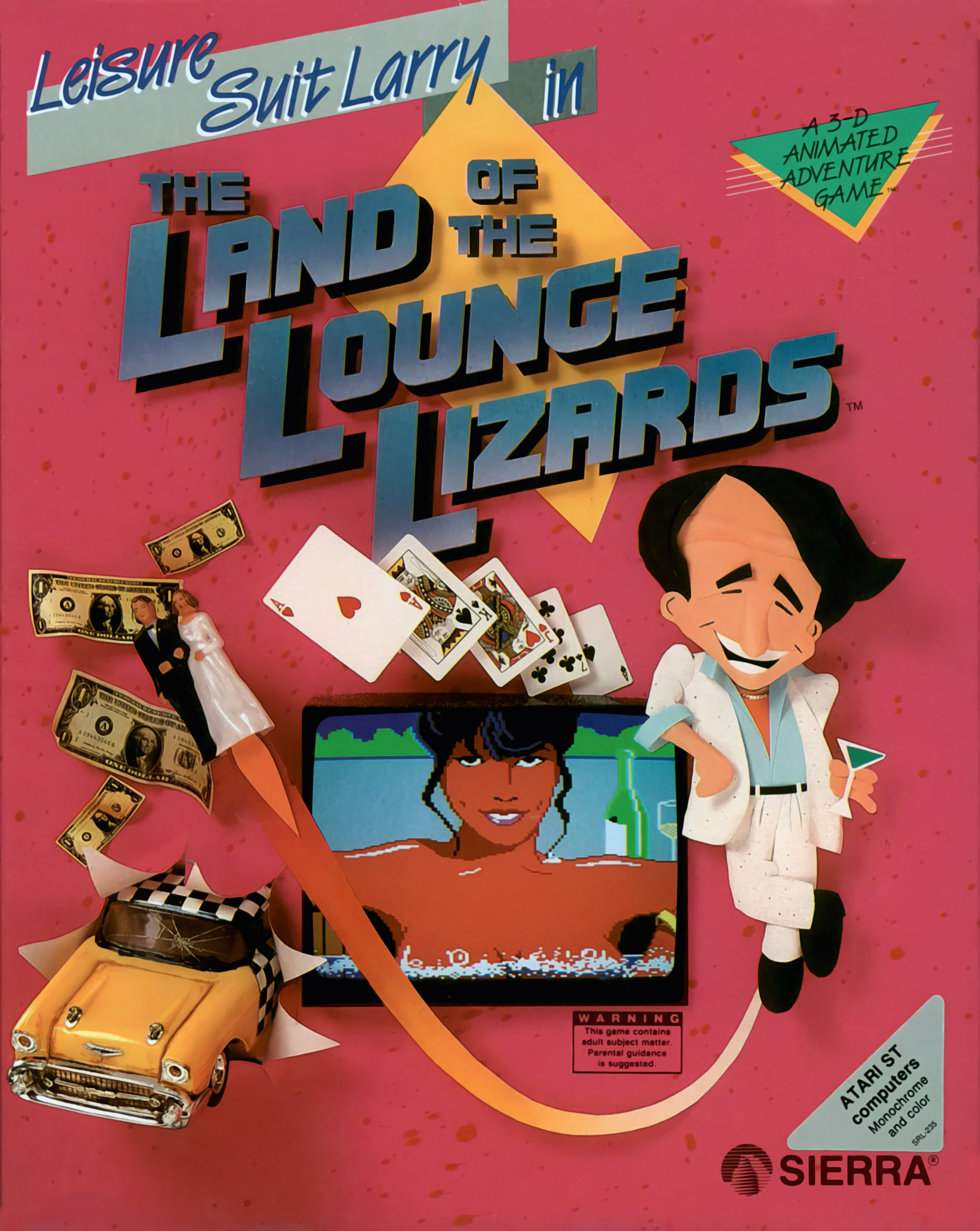
Box art for Leisure Suit Larry in the Land of the Lounge Lizards (1987)

Al Lowe, a designer and programmer on titles like Donald Duck's Playground and King's Quest III, sought to innovate by creating a game that blended humor with interactive storytelling. Inspired by the humor in movies and TV, Lowe aimed to prove that games could be funny too. Lowe leveraged the technological advancements established by Adventure Game Interpreter, the engine behind Sierra's successful series, King's Quest and Space Quest, to venture into an untapped commercial niche.

The series originated with Softporn Adventure, a 1981 text adventure game by Chuck Benton, published by Sierra. This game's plot set the stage for the first "Larry" installment. Al Lowe, reflecting on the game's dated feel, likened it to a '70s leisure suit, a comment that not only influenced the franchise's direction but also inspired the creation of its main character, Larry Laffer. Laffer's persona was partly based on individuals Lowe encountered while performing as a musician in 1970s bars, where he observed their often-unsuccessful attempts to pick-up women.

Lowe maintained the original's structure but rewrote the narrative to include a comedic voice that pokes fun at Larry, significantly altering Softporn's tone. This approach retained just one original line, emphasizing Lowe's significant reimagining of the game’s narrative voice. Although Chuck Benton, Softporn’s creator, is credited in Larry, he did not contribute to its development.

The Leisure Suit Larry series distinguished itself from other adult-themed games with its focus on comedy over explicit content. Marketed by Sierra as a light-hearted adult adventure, Larry aimed for laughs rather than pure titillation, setting it apart in a landscape populated by titles like Strip Poker, Sex Vixens from Space, Leather Goddesses of Phobos, MacPlaymate and Cobra Mission. At most, the raunchier moments were usually hidden as Easter eggs.

Leisure Suit Larry gained notoriety not just for its adult-themed content but also as a symbol of the rampant issue of software piracy. The scale of piracy was such that, according to Sierra, sales of hint books for the game at one point surpassed the sales of the game itself. Moreover, pirated versions of Leisure Suit Larry carried an unexpected threat: computer viruses. Banks in Switzerland, Germany, and England experienced significant data losses after employees, in ill-advised attempts to play pirated versions on work computers, introduced these viruses into their systems.

Recognized as one of 1988's best-selling games by the Software Publishers Association, sales of Leisure Suit Larry in the Land of the Lounge Lizards surpassed 250,000 copies in its first year; the first three installments each sold more than their predecessors during their initial 90 days of release. However, by the time Leisure Suit Larry 5: Passionate Patti Does a Little Undercover Work was released, sales began to plateau. Leisure Suit Larry: Love for Sail!, despite critical acclaim and a booming home PC market, only sold around 280,000 copies—a figure below expectations for a mid-90s flagship game, and insufficient to recoup the millions spent on development and manufacturing.

Following its acquisition by CUC International in 1996, Lowe's relationship with Sierra underwent significant changes. The adult content of the series became a source of contention within the conglomerate, especially within the conservative business culture of its educational software division, Davidson & Associates. Furthermore, Ken Williams, who had been a fervent supporter of designers with a strong vision for their games, left the company that same year. This departure left Lowe without a key advocate.

In 1998, while Leisure Suit Larry 8: Lust in Space was getting underway, Sierra decided to halt production. Subsequent Larry games were released without Lowe's involvement. Lowe, who was on contract rather than a salaried position at Sierra, did not design any more Leisure Suit Larry games.

=== Spin-offs and sequels ===
Leisure Suit Larry: Magna Cum Laude, a spin-off from the original series, introduced Larry Lovage, Leisure Suit Larry's college-aged nephew, as the new protagonist, along with changes in gameplay. It was the first to feature full 3D graphics and to be released on consoles. Developed by High Voltage Software and published by Sierra in 2004, the game received mixed reviews.

In 2008, Sierra Entertainment announced plans to release Leisure Suit Larry: Box Office Bust. It was developed by Team17, and the publishing rights were offered to Codemasters, who published the game in 2009. Box Office Bust was panned by critics, including Al Lowe himself, who thanked the publisher for keeping him away from developing the game.

Assemble Entertainment released two Leisure Suit Larry games, rejuvenating the series with contemporary settings while retaining its humor. Leisure Suit Larry: Wet Dreams Don't Dry (2018) places Larry in the modern dating world, while its sequel, Leisure Suit Larry: Wet Dreams Dry Twice (2020), continues his quest for love.

=== Remakes and remasters ===
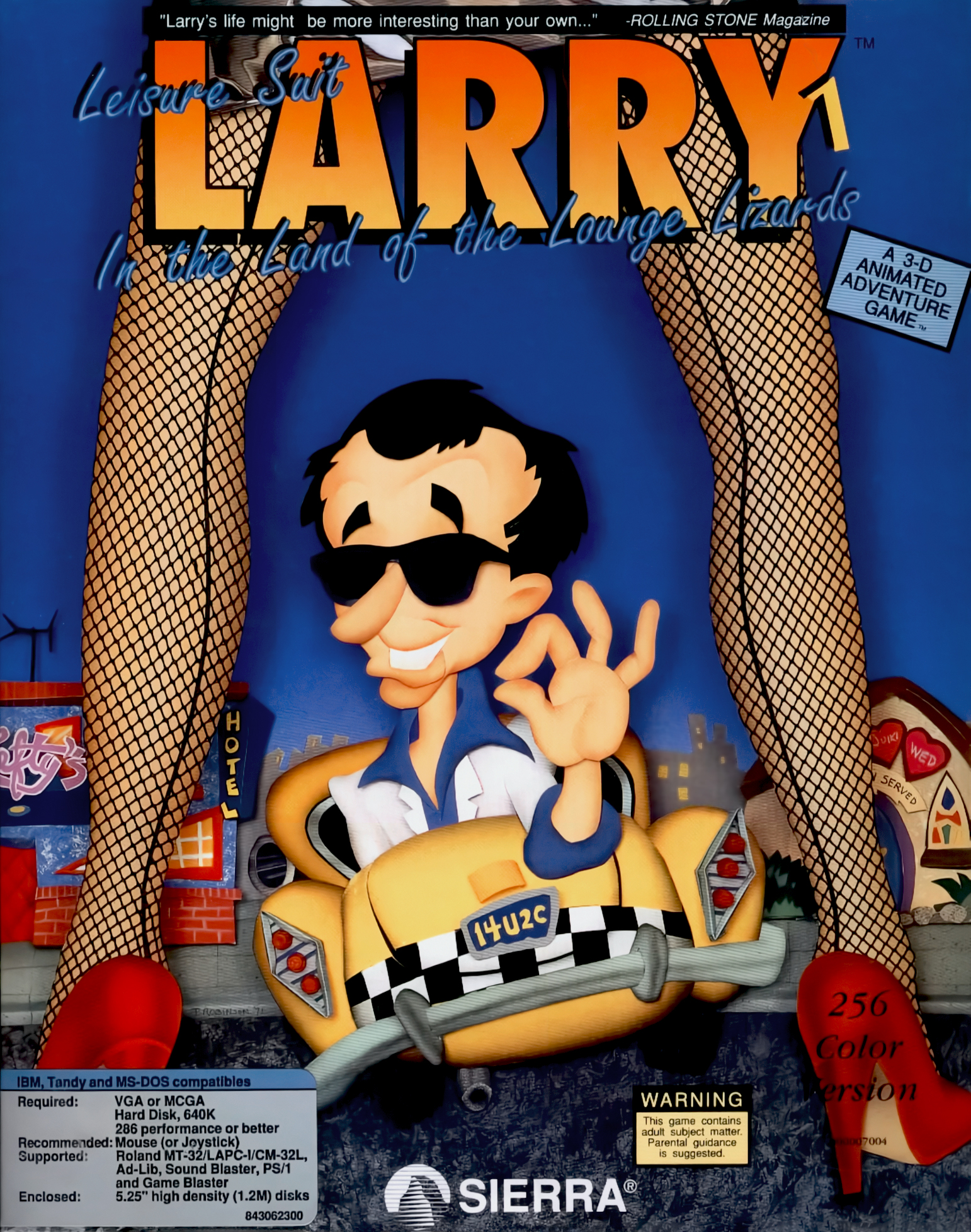
Leisure Suit Larry in the Land of the Lounge Lizards 1991 remake

In 1991, Sierra leveraged advancements in technology to support 256-color graphics for the Leisure Suit Larry VGA remake. Bill Davis, an Emmy-winning artist and graphic designer, served as the creative director for the Leisure Suit Larry I remake. His choice of a Cubist style challenged conventional video game aesthetics while echoing the series' humor and cartoon-like nature of Larry's universe. The creative process included converting hand-painted backgrounds into digital formats, ensuring they complemented the game’s established aesthetic and the recognizable character design of Larry, previously defined by the series' box art.

In 2013, Leisure Suit Larry: Reloaded, a crowdfunded Kickstarter project and the second remake of the original game, was released in collaboration with series creator Al Lowe. While it received mixed to average reviews, critics noted its nostalgic charm but also pointed out that its features and design felt outdated. Lowe discussed the possibility of remaking Leisure Suit Larry 2 or creating a new sequel, Leisure Suit Larry 8. However, both projects were ultimately canceled.

=== Voice acting ===
The CD-ROM version of Leisure Suit Larry 6: Shape Up or Slip Out!, which doubled the resolution of the original floppy version, is the first Larry game with voice acting. The character of Larry Laffer was voiced by Jan Rabson in all games except Box Office Bust, in which he was voiced by Jeffrey Tambor. Larry Lovage, the protagonist of Magna Cum Laude and Box Office Bust, was voiced by Tim Dadabo in the former and Josh Keaton in the latter.

== Games ==
| Year | Title | Developer | Language | Platforms |
Main series
| 1987 | Leisure Suit Larry in the Land of the Lounge Lizards | Sierra On-Line | English | MS-DOS, Amiga, Apple II, IIGS, Mac OS, Atari ST, Color Computer 3 |
| 1988 | Leisure Suit Larry Goes Looking for Love (in Several Wrong Places) | Sierra On-Line | English | MS-DOS, Amiga, Atari ST |
| 1989 | Leisure Suit Larry III: Passionate Patti in Pursuit of the Pulsating Pectorals | Sierra On-Line | English, French, German | MS-DOS, Amiga, Atari ST |
| 1991 | Leisure Suit Larry 5: Passionate Patti Does a Little Undercover Work | Sierra On-Line | English, Spanish, French, German | MS-DOS, Amiga, Windows, Mac OS |
| 1993 | Leisure Suit Larry 6: Shape Up or Slip Out! | Sierra On-Line | English, Spanish, French, German, Polish | MS-DOS, Windows, Mac OS |
| 1996 | Leisure Suit Larry: Love for Sail! | Sierra On-Line | English, Spanish, French, German, Italian, Russian, Polish | MS-DOS, Windows, Mac OS |
| 2004 | Leisure Suit Larry: Magna Cum Laude | High Voltage Software | English, Spanish, French, German, Italian, Russian, Dutch | Windows, PlayStation 2, Xbox |
| 2009 | Leisure Suit Larry: Box Office Bust | Team17 | English, Spanish, French, German, Italian | Windows, PlayStation 3, Xbox 360 |
| 2018 | Leisure Suit Larry: Wet Dreams Don't Dry | CrazyBunch | English, Spanish, French, German, Italian, Russian, Polish | Windows, macOS, PlayStation 4, Xbox One, Nintendo Switch |
| 2020 | Leisure Suit Larry: Wet Dreams Dry Twice | CrazyBunch | English, Spanish, French, German, Italian, Russian, Polish, Chinese | Windows, MacOS, PlayStation 4, Xbox One, Nintendo Switch, Android |
Remakes and remasters
| 1991 | Leisure Suit Larry in the Land of the Lounge Lizards (remake of 1987 entry) | Sierra On-Line | English, Spanish | MS-DOS, Amiga, Windows, Mac OS |
| 1994 | Leisure Suit Larry 6: Shape Up or Slip Out! (remastered graphics) | Sierra On-Line | English, French, German, Polish | MS-DOS, Windows, Mac OS |
| 2013 | Leisure Suit Larry: Reloaded (2nd remake of 1987 entry) | N-Fusion Interactive | English, Spanish, French, German, Italian, Russian, Polish | Windows, macOS, iOS, Linux, Android |

=== Unreleased games ===
==== Leisure Suit Larry 4: The Missing Floppies ====
Leisure Suit Larry 4: The Missing Floppies is the name for a never-made fourth installment, often regarded as an in-joke. The name, used by official sources and fans, refers to rumors that the reason for the cancellation of the game was the losing of the game's original production floppy disks, after which the developers refused to remake the game from scratch. Other sources claim that it was nothing but an internal office prank. The franchise's installments were numbered as if this installment had been published; the actual fourth installment was Leisure Suit Larry 5: Passionate Patti Does a Little Undercover Work.

Al Lowe gave two official reasons for the cancellation of Leisure Suit Larry 4. The first was that Sierra had begun work on a multiplayer installment for The Sierra Network, but the project failed mostly due to technical reasons. The second was that the ending of Larry 3 was definitive and somehow metafictional, since it showed Larry and Patti coming to the Sierra studios to make games based on their adventures, as well as living happily in a mountain cabin in Coarsegold. This completed a relatively cohesive trilogy, and was a dead-end for a new story arc. In 2012, Lowe discussed what happened to the fourth installment in a video made for a Kickstarter project, in which he said that the idea for skipping Larry 4 came as a flippant comment in the office, and became a "real marketing coup" when selling Larry 5 because buyers would immediately ask what happened to the fourth. It became "one of software's big jokes".

According to production notes given by Lowe, the following events must be assumed to have happened between Larry 3 and Larry 5 to connect the two games: Larry and Patti plan to marry; Patti leaves him at a Yosemite church to pursue her career, but Larry is gone when she returns; the villain of Larry 5, Julius Biggs, somehow steals the game disks and Larry suffers amnesia. The absence of the floppy disks was introduced as a plot element in the sequel to explain how Larry, as a computer generated character, came to suffer from amnesia. Larry 4 appears in several of the other games in the series, including being played in Leisure Suit Larry: Magna Cum Laude. Leisure Suit Larry: Love For Sail! Mobile takes place during the Larry 4 development years, and a subplot for the best ending requires finding the lost disks. A folder named LSL4 could be found on the CD of Leisure Suit Larry Collection in which Al Lowe left a note in a readme file referencing the game and concluding "who says sequels have to be done sequentially?".

MAD Magazine proposed what Leisure Suit Larry 4 might have looked like in a 1990 issue spoofing video games. Their idea was "the after effect of Larry's screwing around with the time coming for Larry having to pay the piper." They proposed the idea of Larry in a maze game similar to Berzerk, where he must steer clear of out-of-wedlock pregnancies he has caused, as well as private investigators, case workers and angry fathers wielding shotguns, making it extremely difficult for Larry to continue his infamous carefree attitude towards casual sex. On April 1, 2009, the abandonware site Abandonia released an alleged "leaked copy" for download. This turned out in fact to be an elaborate April Fools' Day prank: the screenshots were fakes, the review was fictional, and the "game" archive actually contained 55 identical copies of scanned front casing of Leisure Suit Larry: Box Office Bust.

The game is a part of the plot of Space Quest 4: Roger Wilco and the Time Rippers, another Sierra title. In the game, LSL4 is labeled as the cause of a supercomputer virus that crippled Roger's home planet Xenon.

The VGA remake of the first game is sometimes unofficially considered by fans as LSL4, since it was released between the third and fifth game, and is frequently included in LSL compilations. This could also make sense, since Larry is seen developing LSL1 at the end of LSL3, indicating he may actually be working on the remake.

==== Leisure Suit Larry 8 ====
Leisure Suit Larry 8, tentatively subtitled Lust in Space (as well as Explores Uranus in some references), was in full development in 1998 until funding was cut. Shortly afterwards, Sierra's adventure games department was disbanded, and Al Lowe left Sierra on February 22, 1999. Like the canned Space Quest sequel, Larry 8 was to feature 3D computer graphics, but no more than a few test renders now survive. The game Leisure Suit Larry: Explores Uranus, as well as its teaser, was referenced in Leisure Suit Larry: Love for Sail! triggered with an Easter egg, as well as a teaser after completing the game. In 2013, Al Lowe pointed out that this title is still being considered, with support from series co-writer Josh Mandel. Lowe stated that even though he would like to complete the Reloaded series first, Leisure Suit Larry 8 is "absolutely" still in the works.

==== Leisure Suit Larry: Pocket Party ====
Leisure Suit Larry: Pocket Party was a canceled game meant to be released in the second half of 2005 for the N-Gage. The publishers were Vivendi and Nokia, while the developer was TKO-Software. In the game, players would explore a 3D college campus, while solving puzzles and engaging in risque activities. As they search for the ultimate good time, gamers bump into Rosie Palmer, the head cheerleader at Larry's college. Attempting to win over Rosie's heart, Larry is thoroughly embarrassed by her jock boyfriend Chuck Rockwell, but humiliation has never stopped Larry before and he is determined to do anything to be with Rosie. In addition to singleplayer game play, players could also wirelessly battle an opponent in four different turn-based mini-games. Concept art and design document of the game are in hands of Jody Hicks, one of the game's developers. An alpha prototype was spotted at the ObscureGamers forum in February 2021.

==== Leisure Suit Larry: Cocoa Butter ====
In late 2005, Target department stores (through online vendor Amazon.com) began accepting pre-orders for a sequel to Leisure Suit Larry: Magna Cum Laude titled Leisure Suit Larry: Cocoa Butter. This new game was being developed for the PC, PS2, Xbox and PSP systems, but has since been canceled.

== Collections ==
Several Larry collections have been compiled:

| Year | Collection | Contents |
|---|---|---|
| 1991 | Larry 3-Pack | Included the first three games. |
| 1994 | Leisure Suit Larry's Greatest Hits & Misses | Included all Larry games up to Larry 6, both versions of the original game, VGA floppy version of Larry 6, The Laffer Utilities, the original Softporn game, and a limited-edition Leisure Suit Larry book titled "My Scrapbook". |
| 1997 | Leisure Suit Larry: Collection Series | A two-CD collection with everything from the previous collection, plus VGA and SVGA CD-ROM versions of Larry 6, a Larry 7 preview, Larry's Big Score: Pinball, and The Official Book of LSL (Perfectbound Edition). |
| 1999 | Leisure Suit Larry: The Ultimate Pleasure Pack | A four-CD collection adding 1998's Larry's Casino and the full version of Love for Sail! to the previous collection's contents. |
| 2006 | Leisure Suit Larry Collection | Contains the first six games on floppy (with the Larry 1 VGA remake instead of the EGA original and excluding the CD edition of Larry 6). Excluded Love for Sail! due to a hidden Easter egg. Came without printed documentation, including PDFs of the original manuals and loaded through DOSBox. |
| 2013 | Leisure Suit Larry: Greatest Hits and Misses! | A downloadable release on GOG.com including Larry 1–6 (both EGA and VGA remake of Larry 1, and VGA and SVGA CD versions of Larry 6) and Softporn Adventure. Larry 7 sold separately. Softporn Adventure was removed from the pack on February 28, 2018, but remains available to prior purchasers. |
| 2021 | Leisure Suit Larry Collection Bundle Game Bundle (Limited-time) | Offered by humblebundle.com, includes up to nine games with two tiers: titles 1–3 for at least $1 and all nine for at least $10. Titles include Leisure Suit Larry 1–3, Magna Cum Laude Uncut and Uncensored, Leisure Suit Larry 5–7, Leisure Suit Larry - Wet Dreams Don't Dry, and Wet Dreams Dry Twice. |

== Other software and products ==
| Year | Title | Description |
|---|---|---|
| 1989 | Hoyle Book of Games, Volume I | Larry Laffer appears as a character who interacts and speaks with other players. |
| 1992 | LarryLand | An adult-themed experience within The Sierra Network featuring casino games and a virtual bar, with playful interactions monitored for appropriate conduct. |
| 1992 | Crazy Nick's Software Picks: Leisure Suit Larry's Casino | Part of Crazy Nick's Software Picks series, includes casino games from the Leisure Suit Larry series. |
| 1992 | The Laffer Utilities | A parody of the Norton Utilities package. |
| | Leisure Suit Larry's Datebook (unreleased) | Mentioned as a productivity tool featuring custom Larry screens for organizing life. Never released. |
| 1996 | Larry Pops Up! | A non-productivity utility program and screensaver as a promo for Larry 7. |
| 1998 | Leisure Suit Larry's Casino | Larry Laffer runs a casino with various games and an online component, now offline. |
| 2004 | Leisure Suit Larry: Kühle Drinks und heiße Girls | A mini-game pack released in Europe. |
| 2005 | Leisure Suit Larry's Sexy Pinball | A pinball game for mobile phones. |
| 2006 | Leisure Suit Larry Bikini Beach Volley | A beach volley game for mobile phones. |
| 2007 | Leisure Suit Larry Love for Sail | A mobile adventure game with an original story. |
| 2008 | Leisure Suit Larry Magna Cum Laude | A mobile game featuring mini-games to play with the number pad. |
| 2017 | LarryCasino | An online casino game requiring players to find missing objects in a new Larry Laffer adventure. |

- The Official Book of Leisure Suit Larry (1990) (written by Al Lowe and Ralph Roberts, containing background information and hint guides). The book was revised and edited so that there was a second (1991), a third (1993), and a fourth (1997) edition, and Special Edition (released with Larry Collection).
- The Authorized Uncensored Leisure Suit Larry Bedside Companion (1990) (written by Peter Spear), containing the stories of the first three Leisure Suit Larry games, as well as detailed walkthroughs, point lists and maps. The book, like other Sierra books by Peter Spear such as The King's Quest Companion, was revised and edited so that there was a second edition (1991) covering Larry 5.

== Reception and legacy ==
The Leisure Suit Larry series became one of Sierra's most popular during the adventure genre's peak. It was ranked as the 85th top game of all time by Next Generation in 1996, praised for its blend of campy humor and bad puns. The total sales of the first five Leisure Suit Larry games surpassed 2 million copies by 1996, as of Love for Sail's release. By 2011, the series had reached a milestone of 10 million copies sold.

An essay in the anthology book Critical Hits described Leisure Suit Larry as a "profoundly lonely" representation of American masculinity.
