= Leisure suit =

Casual suit, fashionable in the 1970s

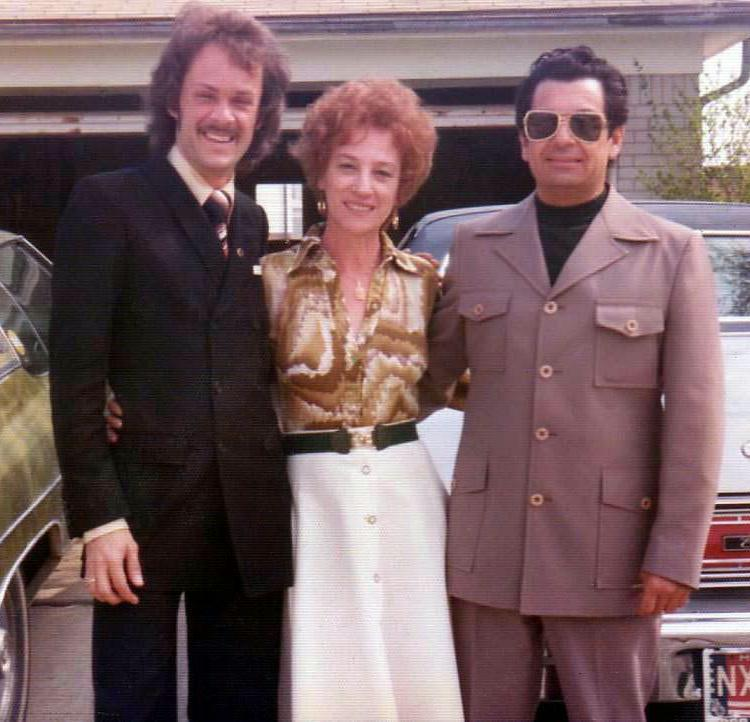
Examples of the leisure suit based on the safari jacket in 1976

A leisure suit is a casual suit consisting of a shirt-like jacket and matching trousers (pants), typically made from polyester. It is associated with American-influenced fashion and fads of the 1970s.

== History ==
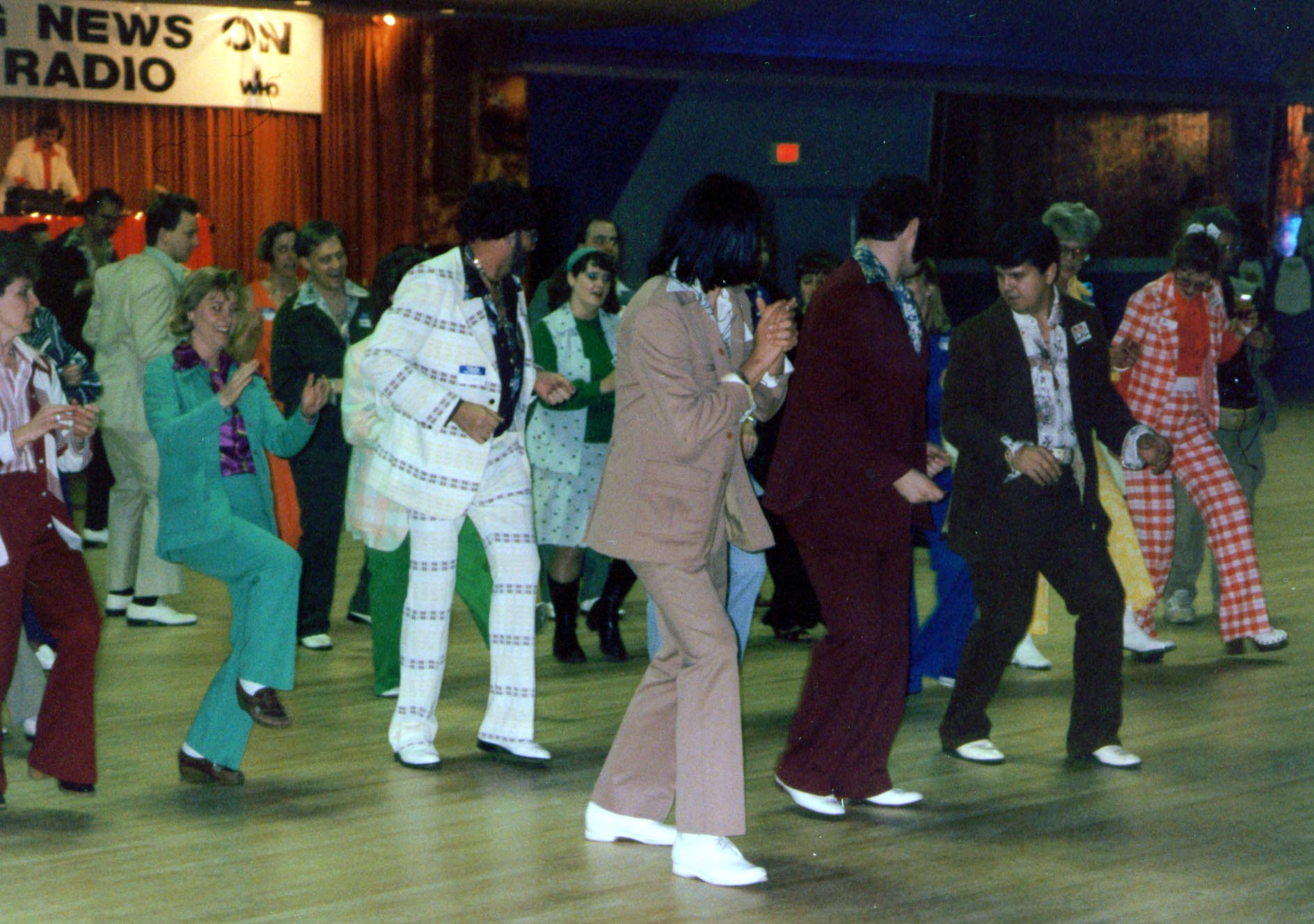
Leisure Suit Convention in 1993

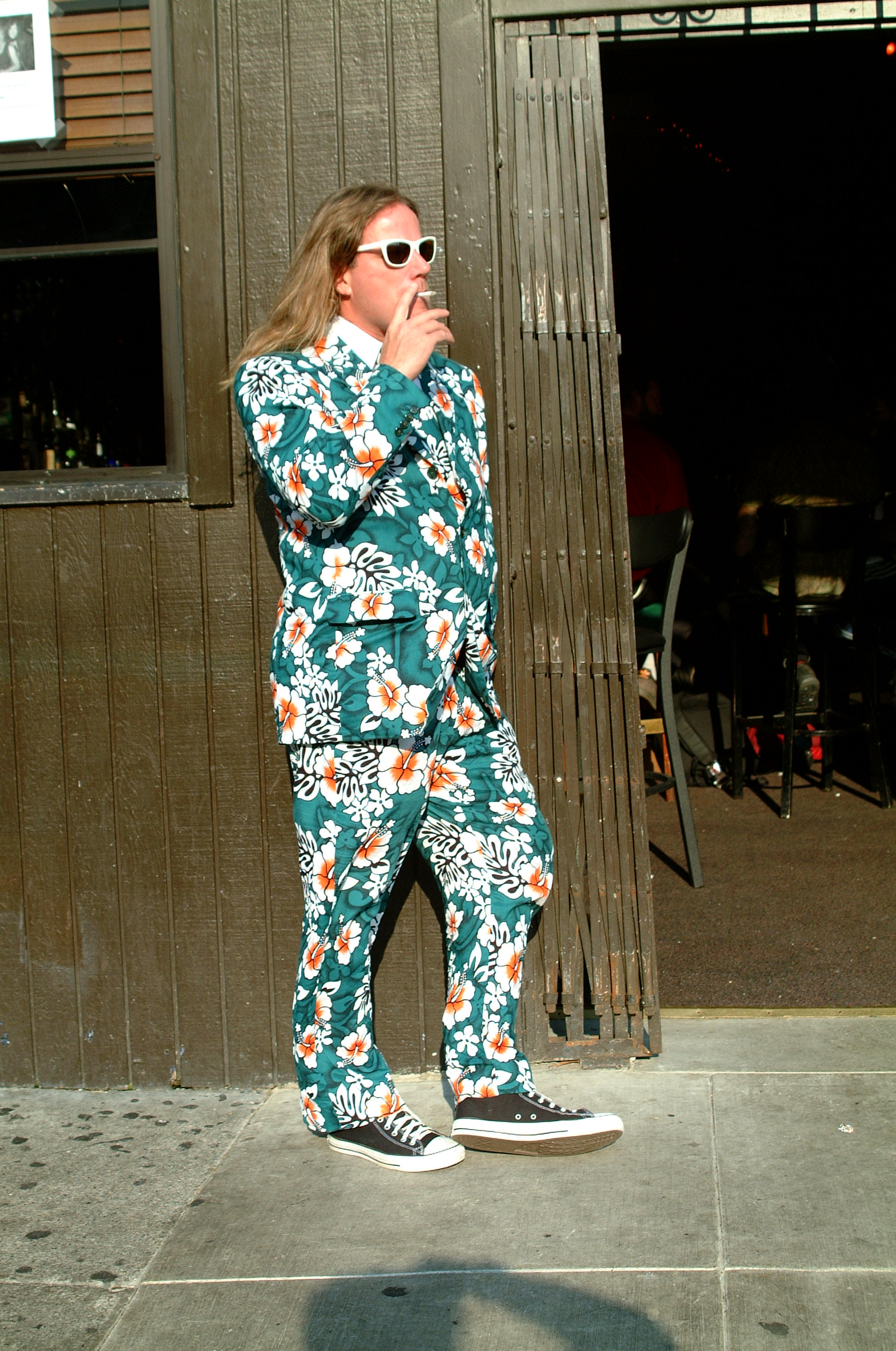
A man wearing a "Hawaiian" leisure suit in 2007

Leisure suits originated on the West coast of the United States in the late 1930s as summer casual-wear for the wealthy, possibly derived from the heavy tweed Norfolk jacket or khaki safari jacket worn by English sportsmen. Made from lightweight fabric and originally known as "Hollywood suits" these were worn until the 1950s, especially in the Southwest where, together with suits derived from the Ike jacket, they became popular formal-wear and often featured contrasting yokes, collars and cuffs (see Western fashion). Suits of this pattern, embellished with embroidery and rhinestones, were made by Nudie Cohn for 1950s country and western musicians, including Tex Williams and the young Elvis Presley.

Suits as casual wear became popular among members of Britain's mod subculture in the 1960s, but only achieved widespread popularity in the United States when—with the creation and popularization of synthetic materials—unprecedented inexpensive prices met with a culture that had come to hate formality. They are frequently associated with that era's disco culture. Leisure suits gained popularity by offering a fashionable, inexpensive suit which could conceivably be used in formal business, yet was casual enough to be worn out of the workplace setting. The leisure suit's height of popularity was around the mid to late 1970s, but it fell from fashion in the very early 1980s. Today it is commonly considered emblematic of 1970s American kitsch.

The leisure suit became associated in popular culture with bars and gangsterism, and conversely, with clueless dressing—the adventure game series Leisure Suit Larry being an example.

== Today ==
Leisure suits are still being offered and worn today, although not in the form of bellbottoms and pastel colors which came to be most associated with the term. Fashion labels such as Dior Homme and Dolce & Gabbana include casual suits among their collections, which are more reminiscent of suits in the style of British mod than American disco. Also, progress since the 1970s with respect to the technology of synthetic fabrics such as polyester has resulted in the creation of new textures.

== See also ==
- Kariba suit
