= Sierra Creative Interpreter =

Game engine developed by Sierra On-Line

- Original authors: Jeff Stephenson; Robert Heitman
- Developer: Sierra On-Line
- Release: September 1988 (38 years ago)
- Final release: 3.000.000 / November 30, 1996 (29 years ago)
- Operating system: MS-DOS, Windows, Classic Mac OS, AmigaOS, Atari TOS
- Platform: Intel 8088, x86, Mac, Amiga, Atari ST
- Available in: English
- Type: Game engine
- License: Proprietary software

The Sierra Creative Interpreter (SCI) is a proprietary game engine and development system developed by Sierra On-Line as the successor to the company's Adventure Game Interpreter (AGI). Sierra introduced SCI in 1988 with King's Quest IV: The Perils of Rosella. Games were written for SCI, which had a separate interpreter for each supported computer platform. This allowed games to be ported between platforms without rewriting the entire game for each machine.

SCI evolved substantially during its use. Its first generation expanded Sierra's graphics, animation, and sound capabilities while retaining the text-parser interface of the company's earlier adventure games. A major revision, SCI1, was introduced with King's Quest V in 1990 and combined 256-color VGA graphics with an icon-driven interface.

== Development ==
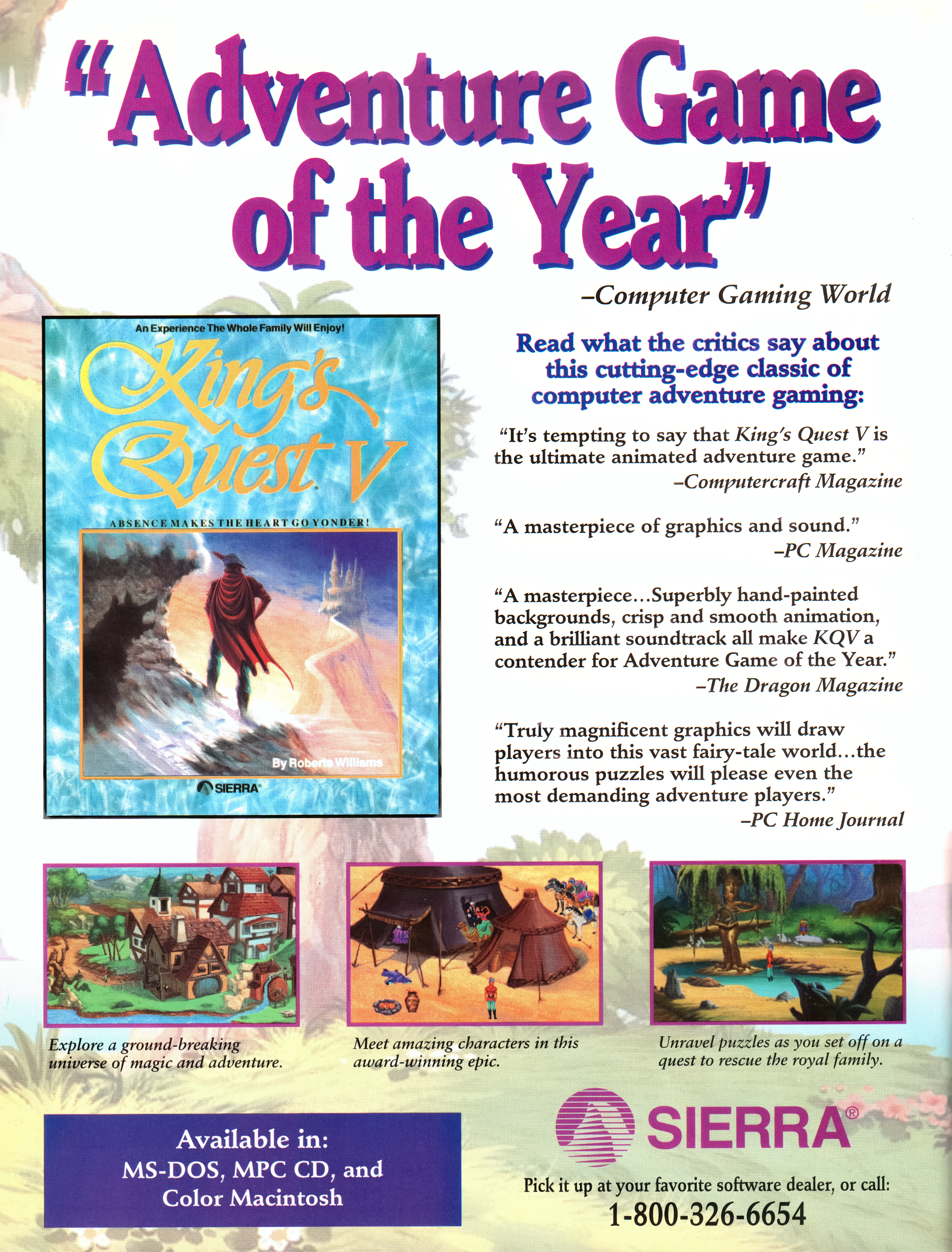
Magazine advertisement for King's Quest V, highlighting the advanced technical capabilities enabled by Sierra's SCI engine.

Sierra realized AGI (originally developed for the IBM PCjr) was “under-equipped” for the new multimedia era.

To meet this challenge, Sierra engineer Jeff Stephenson proposed a completely new, object-oriented interpreter. As he recalls, “AGI was written in such a way that it was going to take a major rework of the entire game engine…and so that’s when I pitched Ken on SCI…let’s go with a whole new language, we’re going to have to rewrite this thing anyway, let’s make things better.”

The result was SCI (initially called LSCI for Large-model Script Code Interpreter), a virtual “bytecode” engine that could be compiled for any platform. As Roberta Williams explained, SCI was designed as “a virtual machine language which means that it will work on any machine…Each machine format has its own version of SCI. Our games are never IBM conversions.”

SCI’s design drew on then-modern programming ideas. Stephenson was influenced by Object-Oriented languages like Smalltalk, which he discovered in a 1981 BYTE issue. He rewrote Sierra’s scripting language into a more structured, object-oriented form. As one retrospective notes, “Stephenson completely rewrote the language…going from a simplistically cryptic scripting language to a full-fledged modern programming language reminiscent of C++, incorporating all the latest thinking about object-oriented coding.” In practical terms, SCI scripts could define classes for rooms, actors, puzzles, etc., making the engine more flexible.

King’s Quest IV (1988) was the first title to employ Sierra’s Creative Interpreter engine, demonstrating the engine’s expanded multimedia support. It featured a full orchestral score by William Goldstein, one of the earliest uses of a Hollywood-style soundtrack in a computer game. These audio enhancements illustrated SCI’s ability to handle more complex musical arrangements and contributed to a more cinematic adventure experience.

== History ==
SCI was developed in successive versions, each offering technical advancements:

Version	Year	Graphics / Resolution	Interface & Engine Advances	Representative titles
SCI0	1988	320 × 200, 16-color EGA	Text-parser interface; engine debut	King’s Quest IV; The Colonel's Bequest
SCI1	1990	256-color VGA	Icon-based point-and-click GUI	King’s Quest V; Space Quest IV; Leisure Suit Larry I (VGA remake)
SCI1.1	1992	256-color VGA (enhanced)	Added enhanced animation and sprite scaling	King’s Quest VI; Laura Bow: The Dagger of Amon Ra
SCI2	1993	640 × 480 SVGA, 256 colors	32-bit protected mode; further engine refinements	Gabriel Knight: Sins of the Fathers; Quest for Glory IV
SCI3	1996	Native Windows 95 rendering	Final iteration; native Windows 95 support	Leisure Suit Larry 7; Phantasmagoria II

== Technical specifications ==
SCI was an interpreted engine using a proprietary scripting language with object-oriented features. It supported platforms including MS-DOS, Windows, Macintosh, Amiga, and FM Towns. Graphics support ranged from 16-color EGA in SCI0 to 256-color SVGA in SCI2/SCI3. SCI also supported a variety of sound hardware, including AdLib, Sound Blaster, and Roland MT-32.

== Notable games ==
- King’s Quest IV-VII
- Space Quest III-VI
- Leisure Suit Larry II-VII
- Police Quest II-IV
- Quest for Glory I-IV
- Gabriel Knight I-II
- Phantasmagoria I-II
- Freddy Pharkas: Frontier Pharmacist
- EcoQuest I-II
- The Laura Bow Mysteries (The Colonel's Bequest; The Dagger of Amon Ra)
- The Sierra Network (Later renamed to the ImagiNation Network)
- The Realm Online

== Legacy and influence ==
SCI was one of the leading adventure game engines of its time, alongside LucasArts' SCUMM. It influenced modern engines like Adventure Game Studio. Preservation efforts include support for SCI games in ScummVM, which merged with the FreeSCI project in 2009.
