= Al Lowe =

American video game designer (born 1946)

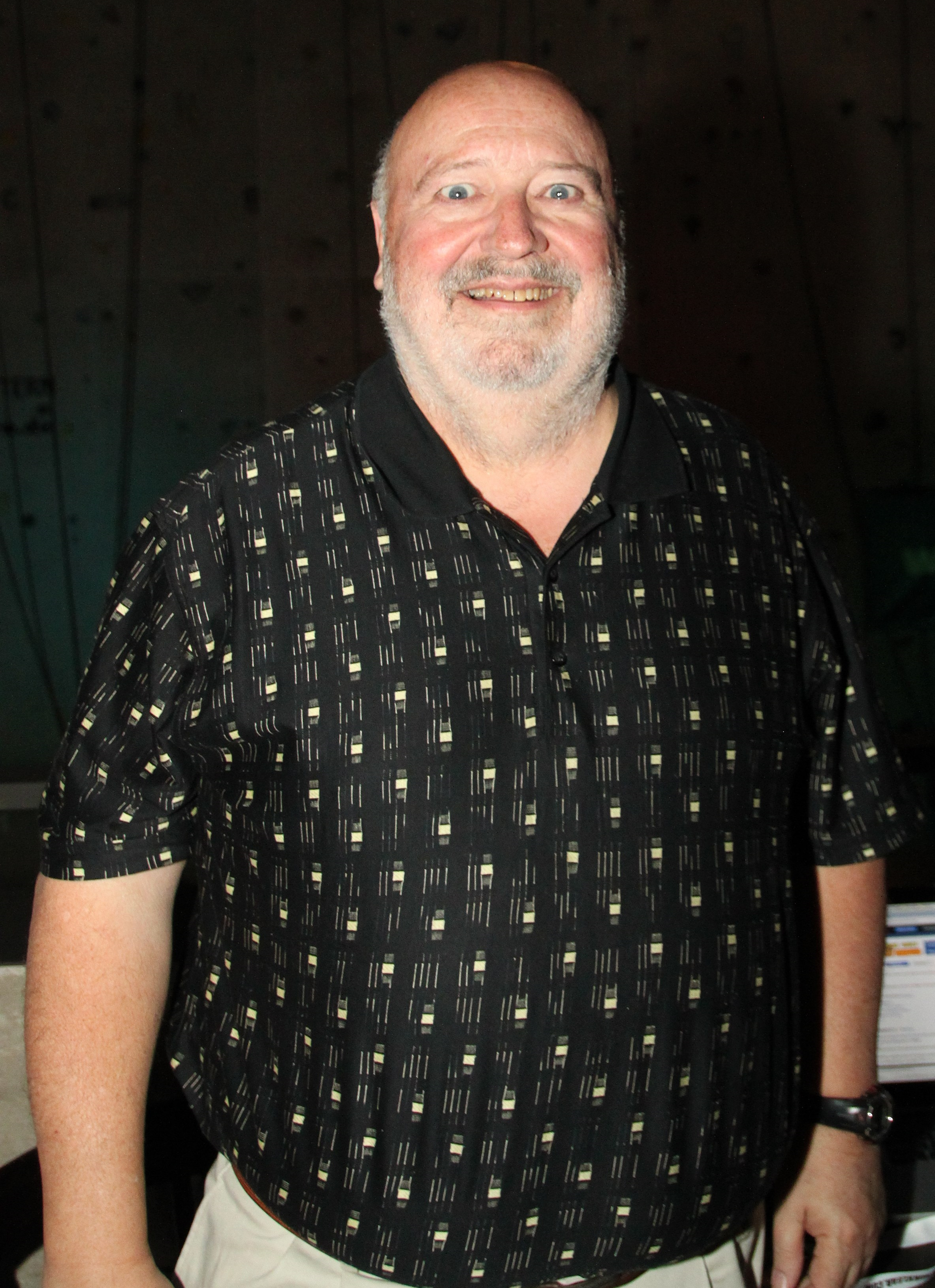
- Lowe at Gamescom 2013
- Born: Albert William Lowe; July 24, 1946 (age 80)
- Education: University of Missouri (MA)
- Occupations: Video game designer, game programmer, musician
- Known for: Leisure Suit Larry
- Spouse: Margaret (m. 1968)
- Website: allowe.com

Albert William Lowe (born July 24, 1946) is an American video game designer who developed several adventure games, mostly for Sierra On-Line. He created the Leisure Suit Larry series. He has also worked as a casting director, voice director, writer, director, producer, background photographer, actor and executive producer.

== Career ==
=== Teaching, early programming ===
Al Lowe on programming the monorail in Larry II (Interview 1989)

Lowe began his working life teaching public school music for 15 years. He taught himself programming during a sick leave. He quit teaching and pursued a career in programming. In 1982 he created three video games for the Apple II: Dragon's Keep, Bop-A-Bet, and Troll's Tale. He was on Name That Tune in the 1984–85 season and was a semifinalist in one of that season's Tournaments of Champions.

Sierra Entertainment bought these games in 1983 and Lowe worked for them as a programmer and game designer for 16 years. His first projects included Winnie the Pooh in the Hundred Acre Wood, Donald Duck's Playground, and The Black Cauldron, all based on Disney properties. Later, he was lead programmer on King's Quest III and Police Quest I and also created the music for other Sierra games. Lowe is best known for his Leisure Suit Larry series of games. After Larry's success, Lowe also designed other games such as Torin's Passage and Freddy Pharkas: Frontier Pharmacist (with Josh Mandel). Throughout his career, Lowe was known for his distinctive bald head, full beard, and considerable beer belly, and liked to call himself "the world's oldest game designer". Next Generation listed Lowe in their "75 Most Important People in the Games Industry of 1995", chiefly for the Leisure Suit Larry series.

=== Sam Suede: Undercover Exposure ===
Computer Gaming World reported a rumor in July 1994 that Lowe was working on a new series, Capitol Punishment, with the first game being "Bill and Hillary's Whitewater Adventure". That year he moved with his family to Seattle and supposedly retired in 1998. In a 2006 interview, Lowe revealed that he was not actually retired, but had spent well over a year secretly designing a new game Sam Suede: Undercover Exposure, an action comedy game developed by iBase Entertainment, which he co-founded with Ken Wegrzyn. Unable to locate a publisher to promote and distribute Sam Suede, iBase Entertainment shut down in December 2006. Following this setback, Lowe expressed serious doubts whether he'd ever reenter the gaming industry again. As of January 2007, the website for Sam Suede developer iBase Entertainment listed the project as postponed pending acquisition of additional development funding.

=== Later developing ===
In 2010, Lowe produced and directed Al Lowe's Comedy Club, developed by The Binary Mill for iOS devices. He has since been recruited by Replay Games to work on high-definition remakes of six of the first seven Leisure Suit Larry games (the fourth entry in the series was deliberately skipped as part of the "fifth" game's plot). On December 11, 2013, it was announced that Lowe had left Replay Games and returned to retirement. While Replay Games' official statement claimed that Lowe's departure was amicable, Lowe himself disputed this, stating that the parting did not happen on good terms.

=== Al Lowe's Sierra Source Code ===
In 2018, Lowe posted a listing at popular auction website eBay of an entire backup of his own works at Sierra because he noted that Sierra had no intention of ever backing up any source code. Lowe said, "I backed everything up because I knew Sierra didn't." These included original floppies, boxes, manuals and source code for various games including popular titles such as the original Leisure Suit Larry and Space Quest among others. Shortly after he posted the listing, he sat down for an in depth interview with MetalJesusRocks, a former colleague and ex-Sierra employee where the two had a detailed discussion regarding the entire collection and its ultimate value.

== Personal life ==
Lowe grew up in Chesterfield, Missouri, a suburb of St. Louis. Both Lowe and his wife Margaret, whom he married in 1968, are University of Missouri graduates. During college, Lowe played saxophone in university bands, and after graduation, worked in education as a band director.

Lowe is an avid model railroader and a member of the board of directors of the 4th Division of the Pacific Northwest Region of the National Model Railroad Association. In November 2007, he was the guest of honor at the Alternative Party 2007 in Helsinki, Finland and played saxophone live with David Hasselhoff Big Band. He also runs a website, Al Lowe's Humor Site, and CyberJoke 3000, a daily joke mailing list.

== Games ==
Name	Year	Credited with	Publisher
Bop-A-Bet	1982	programmer	Sunnyside Soft
Dragon's Keep	1982	programmer, writer, artist	Sunnyside Soft
Troll's Tale	1983	programmer, writer, artist	Sierra On-Line
Gelfling Adventure	1984	programmer	Sierra On-Line
Donald Duck's Playground	1984	designer, programmer, composer	Sierra On-Line
Mickey's Space Adventure	1984	composer	Sierra On-Line
Winnie the Pooh in the Hundred Acre Wood	1984	designer	Sierra On-Line
King's Quest II: Romancing the Throne	1985	composer	Sierra On-Line
The Black Cauldron	1986	designer, programmer	Sierra On-Line
King's Quest III: To Heir Is Human	1986	programmer	Sierra On-Line
Leisure Suit Larry in the Land of the Lounge Lizards	1987	designer, programmer, writer, composer	Sierra On-Line
Police Quest: In Pursuit of the Death Angel	1987	programmer	Sierra On-Line
King's Quest IV: The Perils of Rosella	1988	programmer	Sierra On-Line
Leisure Suit Larry Goes Looking for Love (in Several Wrong Places)	1988	designer, programmer, writer, composer	Sierra On-Line
Leisure Suit Larry III: Passionate Patti in Pursuit of the Pulsating Pectorals	1989	producer, designer, programmer, writer	Sierra On-Line
Leisure Suit Larry 5: Passionate Patti Does a Little Undercover Work	1991	director, designer, programmer, composer	Sierra On-Line
Leisure Suit Larry 1: In the Land of the Lounge Lizards	1991	director, designer, programmer	Sierra On-Line
Freddy Pharkas: Frontier Pharmacist	1993	designer, writer, voice direction	Sierra On-Line
Leisure Suit Larry 6: Shape Up or Slip Out!	1993	director, producer, designer, writer, composer	Sierra On-Line
Torin's Passage	1995	designer, writer, composer	Sierra On-Line
Leisure Suit Larry: Love for Sail!	1996	director, designer, writer, composer	Sierra On-Line
Leisure Suit Larry's Casino	1998	director, designer, writer	Sierra On-Line
Leisure Suit Larry: Reloaded	2013	designer, writer	Replay Games
