= List of Sierra Entertainment video games =

Sierra Entertainment was a software label which publishes games from indie developers. Founded in 1979 by Ken and Roberta Williams, it developed and published a large variety of video games, including a number of best-selling games and series, for various platforms between 1980 and 2008. After 2004, Sierra developed no new games but worked strictly as a publishing label for their parent company Vivendi Games. In 2014, the brand was resurrected as an indie publisher by owners Activision Blizzard.

== Games ==
Release date	Title	Platform(s)	Developer(s)	Division	Ref.
1980	Hi-Res Adventure #0: Mission Asteroid	Apple II	On-Line Systems	On-Line Systems	
1980	Hi-Res Adventure #0: Mission Asteroid	Atari 8-bit	Yosemite Software	On-Line Systems	
May 5, 1980	Hi-Res Adventure #1: Mystery House	Apple II	On-Line Systems	On-Line Systems	
1980	Hi-Res Adventure #2: The Wizard and the Princess	Apple II	On-Line Systems	On-Line Systems	
1980	Hi-Res Adventure #2: The Wizard and the Princess	Atari 8-bit	Yosemite Software	On-Line Systems	
1980	Hi-Res Football	Apple II	On-Line Systems	On-Line Systems	
1981	Crossfire	Apple II	Sierra On-Line	Sierra On-Line	
1981	Crossfire	Atari 8-bit	Sierra On-Line	Sierra On-Line	
1981	Crossfire	VIC-20	Sierra On-Line	Sierra On-Line	
1981	Hi-Res Adventure #3: Cranston Manor	Apple II	On-Line Systems	On-Line Systems	
1981	Hi-Res Adventure #4: Ulysses and the Golden Fleece	Apple II	Sierra On-Line	Sierra On-Line	
1981	Jawbreaker	Apple II	On-Line Systems	On-Line Systems	
1981	Jawbreaker	Atari 8-bit	On-Line Systems	On-Line Systems	
1981	Lunar Leeper	VIC-20	On-Line Systems	On-Line Systems	
1981	Softporn Adventure	Atari 8-bit	Yosemite Software	On-Line Systems	
1981	Pegasus II	Apple II	On-Line Systems	On-Line Systems	
1981	Threshold	Apple II	On-Line Systems	On-Line Systems	
1981	Threshold	Atari 8-bit	On-Line Systems	On-Line Systems	
1981	Threshold	VIC-20	On-Line Systems	On-Line Systems	
1982	Cannonball Blitz	Apple II	Sierra On-Line	Sierra On-Line	
1982	Cannonball Blitz	VIC-20	Sierra On-Line	Sierra On-Line	
1982	Crossfire	IBM PC self-booting disk	Sierra On-Line	Sierra On-Line	
1982	Hi-Res Adventure #4: Ulysses and the Golden Fleece	Atari 8-bit	Yosemite Software	On-Line Systems	
1982	Hi-Res Adventure #4: Ulysses and the Golden Fleece	IBM PC self-booting disk	Yosemite Software	On-Line Systems	
1982	Lunar Leepers	Apple II	Sierra On-Line	Sierra On-Line	
1982	Hi-Res Adventure #5: Time Zone	Apple II	Sierra On-Line	Sierra On-Line	
1982	Ultima II: The Revenge of the Enchantress...	Apple II	Sierra On-Line	Sierra On-Line	
July 1983	Frogger	VIC-20	Parker Brothers	Sierra On-Line	
July 1983	Hi-Res Adventure #6: The Dark Crystal	Atari 8-bit	Sierra On-Line	Sierra On-Line	
September 1983	Apple Cider Spider	C64	Sierra On-Line	Sierra On-Line	
October 1983	BC's Quest for Tires	Atari 8-bit	Sydney Development Corporation	Sierra On-Line	
November 1983	BC's Quest for Tires	ColecoVision	Sierra On-Line	Sierra On-Line	
November 1983	Lunar Leeper	C64	Sierra On-Line	Sierra On-Line	
November 1983	Sammy Lightfoot	C64	Sierra On-Line	Sierra On-Line	
November 1983	Threshold	C64	Sierra On-Line	Sierra On-Line	
December 1983	Hi-Res Adventure #0: Mission Asteroid	C64	Sierra On-Line	Sierra On-Line	
December 1983	Oil's Well	C64	Sierra On-Line	Sierra On-Line	
1983	Apple Cider Spider	Apple II	Sierra On-Line	Sierra On-Line	
1983	Bop-A-Bet	Apple II	SunnySide Soft	Sierra On-Line	
1983	Crossfire	C64	Sierra On-Line	Sierra On-Line	
1983	Frogger	Apple II	Sierra On-Line	Sierra On-Line	
1983	Frogger	C64	Konami	Sierra On-Line	
1983	Frogger	IBM PC self-booting disk	Sierra On-Line	Sierra On-Line	
1983	Hi-Res Adventure #6: The Dark Crystal	Apple II	Sierra On-Line	Sierra On-Line	
1983	Lunar Leeper	Atari 8-bit	Sierra On-Line	Sierra On-Line	
1983	Mine Shaft	Apple II	Sierra On-Line	Sierra On-Line	
1983	Mine Shaft	IBM PC self-booting disk	Sierra On-Line	Sierra On-Line	
1983	Mr. Cool	Apple II	Sierra On-Line	Sierra On-Line	
1983	Mr. Cool	Atari 8-bit	Sierra On-Line	Sierra On-Line	
1983	Mr. Cool	C64	Sierra On-Line	Sierra On-Line	
1983	Mr. Cool	IBM PC self-booting disk	Sierra On-Line	Sierra On-Line	
1983	Sammy Lightfoot	Apple II	Sierra On-Line	Sierra On-Line	
1983	Troll's Tale	Apple II	Sierra On-Line	Sierra On-Line	
1983	Ultima II: The Revenge of the Enchantress...	Atari 8-bit	Sierra On-Line	Sierra On-Line	
1983	Ultima II: The Revenge of the Enchantress...	C64	Sierra On-Line	Sierra On-Line	
1983	Ultima II: The Revenge of the Enchantress...	MS-DOS	Sierra On-Line	Sierra On-Line	
1983	Ultima: Escape from Mt. Drash	VIC-20	Sierra On-Line	Sierra On-Line	
March 1984	BC's Quest for Tires	Apple II	Sydney Development Corporation	Sierra On-Line	
March 1984	Oil's Well	Apple II	Sierra On-Line	Sierra On-Line	
March 1984	Oil's Well	ColecoVision	Sierra On-Line	Sierra On-Line	
March 1984	Sammy Lightfoot	ColecoVision	Sierra On-Line	Sierra On-Line	
May 1984	Threshold	ColecoVision	Sierra On-Line	Sierra On-Line	
October 1984	King's Quest	Apple II	Sierra On-Line	Sierra On-Line	
October 1984	Oil's Well	Atari 8-bit	Sierra On-Line	Sierra On-Line	
1984	Cannonball Blitz	TI-99/4A	Sierra On-Line	Sierra On-Line	
1984	BC's Quest for Tires	C64	Sydney Development Corporation	Sierra On-Line	
1984	BC's Quest for Tires	MS-DOS	Sydney Development Corporation	Sierra On-Line	
1984	BC's Quest for Tires	IBM PC self-booting disk	Sydney Development Corporation	Sierra On-Line	
1984	Dragon's Keep	Atari 8-bit	SunnySide Soft	Sierra On-Line	
1984	Dragon's Keep	C64	Sierra On-Line	Sierra On-Line	
1984	Dragon's Keep	IBM PC self-booting disk	Sierra On-Line	Sierra On-Line	
1984	Frogger	Mac	Sierra On-Line	Sierra On-Line	
1984	Hi-Res Adventure #2: The Wizard and the Princess	C64	Sierra On-Line	Sierra On-Line	
1984	Hi-Res Adventure #4: Ulysses and the Golden Fleece	C64	Sierra On-Line	Sierra On-Line	
1984	King's Quest	IBM PC self-booting disk	Sierra On-Line	Sierra On-Line	
1984	Oil's Well	C64	Sierra On-Line	Sierra On-Line	
1984	Troll's Tale	Atari 8-bit	Sierra On-Line	Sierra On-Line	
1984	Troll's Tale	C64	Sierra On-Line	Sierra On-Line	
1984	Troll's Tale	IBM PC self-booting disk	Sierra On-Line	Sierra On-Line	
1984	B.C. II: Grog's Revenge	C64	Sydney Development	Sierra On-Line	
1984	B.C. II: Grog's Revenge	ColecoVision	Sydney Development	Sierra On-Line	
1984	B.C. II: Grog's Revenge	MSX	Sydney Development	Sierra On-Line	
1984	B.C. II: Grog's Revenge	ZX Spectrum	Sydney Development	Sierra On-Line	
1984	Donald Duck's Playground	Amiga	Sierra On-Line	Sierra On-Line	
1984	Donald Duck's Playground	Atari ST	Sierra On-Line	Sierra On-Line	
1984	Donald Duck's Playground	Apple II	Sierra On-Line	Sierra On-Line	
1984	Donald Duck's Playground	C64	Sierra On-Line	Sierra On-Line	
1984	Donald Duck's Playground	PCjr	Sierra On-Line	Sierra On-Line	
1984	Donald Duck's Playground	MS-DOS	Sierra On-Line	Sierra On-Line	
1984	Learning with FuzzyWOMP	Apple II	Sierra On-Line	Sierra On-Line	
1984	Mickey's Space Adventure	MS-DOS	Sierra On-Line	Sierra On-Line	
1984	Mickey's Space Adventure	Mac	Sierra On-Line	Sierra On-Line	
1984	Mickey's Space Adventure	Apple II	Sierra On-Line	Sierra On-Line	
1984	Mickey's Space Adventure	C64	Sierra On-Line	Sierra On-Line	
1984	Mickey's Space Adventure	TRS-80	Sierra On-Line	Sierra On-Line	
1984	Sierra Championship Boxing	Apple II	Evryware	Sierra On-Line	
1984	Sierra Championship Boxing	C64	Evryware	Sierra On-Line	
1984	Sierra Championship Boxing	MS-DOS	Evryware	Sierra On-Line	
1984	Sierra Championship Boxing	Mac	Evryware	Sierra On-Line	
1984	Winnie the Pooh in the Hundred Acre Wood	Amiga	Sierra On-Line	Sierra On-Line	
1984	Winnie the Pooh in the Hundred Acre Wood	Apple II	Sierra On-Line	Sierra On-Line	
1984	Winnie the Pooh in the Hundred Acre Wood	Atari ST	Sierra On-Line	Sierra On-Line	
1984	Winnie the Pooh in the Hundred Acre Wood	C64	Sierra On-Line	Sierra On-Line	
1984	Winnie the Pooh in the Hundred Acre Wood	MS-DOS	Sierra On-Line	Sierra On-Line	
1984	Learning With the Leeper	Atari 8-bit	Sierra On-Line	Sierra On-Line	
1984	Learning With the Leeper	ColecoVision	Sierra On-Line	Sierra On-Line	
1984	Learning With the Leeper	C64	Sierra On-Line	Sierra On-Line	
1984	Learning With the Leeper	ZX Spectrum	Sierra On-Line	Sierra On-Line	
1984	Wizard of ID's WizType (Note: Typing tutor)	Apple II	Sydney Development	Sierra On-Line	
1984	Wizard of ID's WizType	Atari 8-bit	Sydney Development	Sierra On-Line	
1984	Wizard of ID's WizType	C64	Sydney Development	Sierra On-Line	
1984	Wizard of ID's WizType	MS-DOS	Sydney Development	Sierra On-Line	
1985	Ultima II: The Revenge of the Enchantress...	Atari ST	Sierra On-Line	Sierra On-Line	
1985	Ultima II: The Revenge of the Enchantress...	Mac	Sierra On-Line	Sierra On-Line	
May 1985	King's Quest II: Romancing the Throne	MS-DOS	Sierra On-Line	Sierra On-Line	
May 1985	King's Quest II: Romancing the Throne	Mac	Sierra On-Line	Sierra On-Line	
May 1985	King's Quest II: Romancing the Throne	Apple II	Sierra On-Line	Sierra On-Line	
May 1985	King's Quest II: Romancing the Throne	Apple IIGS	Sierra On-Line	Sierra On-Line	
May 1985	King's Quest II: Romancing the Throne	Amiga	Sierra On-Line	Sierra On-Line	
May 1985	King's Quest II: Romancing the Throne	Atari ST	Sierra On-Line	Sierra On-Line	
May 1985	King's Quest II: Romancing the Throne	PCjr	Sierra On-Line	Sierra On-Line	
May 1985	King's Quest II: Romancing the Throne	Tandy 1000	Sierra On-Line	Sierra On-Line	
December 1986	King's Quest	Amiga	Sierra On-Line	Sierra On-Line	
December 1986	King's Quest	Atari ST	Sierra On-Line	Sierra On-Line	
December 1986	King's Quest	Mac	Sierra On-Line	Sierra On-Line	
1986	Wrath of Denethenor	Apple II	Sierra On-Line	Sierra On-Line	
1986	Wrath of Denethenor	C64	Sierra On-Line	Sierra On-Line	
1986	The Black Cauldron	MS-DOS	Sierra On-Line	Sierra On-Line	
1986	The Black Cauldron	Amiga	Sierra On-Line	Sierra On-Line	
1986	The Black Cauldron	Apple II	Sierra On-Line	Sierra On-Line	
1986	The Black Cauldron	Apple IIGS	Sierra On-Line	Sierra On-Line	
1986	The Black Cauldron	Atari ST	Sierra On-Line	Sierra On-Line	
1986	The Black Cauldron	Tandy 1000	Sierra On-Line	Sierra On-Line	
October 1, 1986	King's Quest III: To Heir Is Human	MS-DOS	Sierra On-Line	Sierra On-Line	
October 1, 1986	King's Quest III: To Heir Is Human	Apple II	Sierra On-Line	Sierra On-Line	
October 1, 1986	King's Quest III: To Heir Is Human	Apple IIGS	Sierra On-Line	Sierra On-Line	
October 1, 1986	King's Quest III: To Heir Is Human	Amiga	Sierra On-Line	Sierra On-Line	
October 1, 1986	King's Quest III: To Heir Is Human	Atari ST	Sierra On-Line	Sierra On-Line	
October 1, 1986	King's Quest III: To Heir Is Human	Mac	Sierra On-Line	Sierra On-Line	
October 1, 1986	King's Quest III: To Heir Is Human	Tandy Color Computer 3	Sierra On-Line	Sierra On-Line	
October 1986	Space Quest: The Sarien Encounter	MS-DOS	Sierra On-Line	Sierra On-Line	
October 1986	Space Quest: The Sarien Encounter	Mac	Sierra On-Line	Sierra On-Line	
October 1986	Space Quest: The Sarien Encounter	Apple II	Sierra On-Line	Sierra On-Line	
October 1986	Space Quest: The Sarien Encounter	Apple IIGS	Sierra On-Line	Sierra On-Line	
October 1986	Space Quest: The Sarien Encounter	Amiga	Sierra On-Line	Sierra On-Line	
October 1986	Space Quest: The Sarien Encounter	Atari ST	Sierra On-Line	Sierra On-Line	
1987	King's Quest	MS-DOS	Sierra On-Line	Sierra On-Line	
1987	3-D Helicopter Simulator	MS-DOS	Sierra On-Line	Sierra On-Line	
July 5, 1987	Leisure Suit Larry in the Land of the Lounge Lizards	MS-DOS, Amiga, Apple II, Apple IIGS, Mac, Atari ST, Tandy Color Computer 3	Sierra On-Line	Sierra On-Line	
1987	Police Quest: In Pursuit of the Death Angel	Amiga	Sierra On-Line	Sierra On-Line	
1987	Police Quest: In Pursuit of the Death Angel	Apple II	Sierra On-Line	Sierra On-Line	
1987	Police Quest: In Pursuit of the Death Angel	Apple IIGS	Sierra On-Line	Sierra On-Line	
1987	Police Quest: In Pursuit of the Death Angel	Atari ST	Sierra On-Line	Sierra On-Line	
1987	Police Quest: In Pursuit of the Death Angel	MS-DOS	Sierra On-Line	Sierra On-Line	
1987	Police Quest: In Pursuit of the Death Angel	Mac	Sierra On-Line	Sierra On-Line	
1987	Mixed-Up Mother Goose	Amiga	Sierra On-Line	Sierra On-Line	
1987	Mixed-Up Mother Goose	Apple II	Sierra On-Line	Sierra On-Line	
1987	Mixed-Up Mother Goose	Apple IIGS	Sierra On-Line	Sierra On-Line	
1987	Mixed-Up Mother Goose	Atari ST	Sierra On-Line	Sierra On-Line	
1987	Mixed-Up Mother Goose	MS-DOS	Sierra On-Line	Sierra On-Line	
November 14, 1987	Space Quest II: Vohaul's Revenge	MS-DOS, Mac, Apple II, Apple IIGS, Amiga, Atari ST	Sierra On-Line	Sierra On-Line	
1988	Gold Rush!	MS-DOS, Amiga, Atari ST, Mac, Apple II, Apple IIGS	Sierra On-Line	Sierra On-Line	
September 1988	King's Quest IV: The Perils of Rosella	MS-DOS, Amiga, Apple II, Apple IIGS, Atari ST	Sierra On-Line	Sierra On-Line	
October 1988	Leisure Suit Larry Goes Looking for Love (in Several Wrong Places)	MS-DOS, Amiga, Atari ST, Apple IIGS	Sierra On-Line	Sierra On-Line	
November 1988	Manhunter: New York	MS-DOS, Amiga, Atari ST, Apple IIGS, Tandy 1000	Evryware	Sierra On-Line	
1988	Police Quest II: The Vengeance	MS-DOS, Amiga, Atari ST, PC-98	Sierra On-Line	Sierra On-Line	
1988	Silpheed	Apple IIGS, MS-DOS, TRS-80	Game Arts	Sierra On-Line	
1988	King's Quest	Apple IIGS	Sierra On-Line	Sierra On-Line	
1989	Codename: ICEMAN	MS-DOS, Amiga, Atari ST	Sierra On-Line	Sierra On-Line	
October 1989	The Colonel's Bequest	Amiga, Atari ST, MS-DOS	Sierra On-Line	Sierra On-Line	
October 1989	Hero's Quest: So You Want to Be a Hero	MS-DOS, Amiga, Atari ST, PC-98, Mac	Sierra On-Line	Sierra On-Line	
1989	Hoyle's Official Book of Games: Volume 1	MS-DOS, Mac, Amiga, Atari ST	Sierra Entertainment	Sierra Entertainment	
November 1989	Leisure Suit Larry III: Passionate Patti in Pursuit of the Pulsating Pectorals	MS-DOS, Amiga, Atari ST, Apple IIGS	Sierra On-Line	Sierra On-Line	
1989	Manhunter 2: San Francisco	MS-DOS, Amiga, Atari ST, Mac	Evryware	Sierra On-Line	
March 24, 1989	Space Quest III: The Pirates of Pestulon	MS-DOS, Mac, Amiga, Atari ST	Sierra On-Line	Sierra On-Line	
1990	Oil's Well	MS-DOS	Sierra On-Line	Sierra On-Line	
1990	Conquests of Camelot: The Search for the Grail	MS-DOS, Amiga, Atari ST	Sierra On-Line	Sierra On-Line	
1990	Fire Hawk: Thexder The Second Contact	MS-DOS	Game Arts	Sierra On-Line	
1990	Hoyle's Official Book of Games: Volume 2	MS-DOS, Mac, Amiga, Atari ST	Sierra Entertainment	Sierra Entertainment	
September 19, 1990	King's Quest: Quest for the Crown (SCI remake)	Amiga, MS-DOS	Sierra On-Line	Sierra On-Line	
November 9, 1990	King's Quest V: Absence Makes the Heart Go Yonder!	MS-DOS, NES, Mac, Amiga, FM Towns, Tandy Memorex VIS, PC-98, Windows 3.x	Sierra On-Line	Sierra On-Line	
1990	Oil's Well (remake)	MS-DOS	Banana Development	Sierra On-Line	
1990	Quest for Glory II: Trial by Fire	MS-DOS, Amiga	Sierra On-Line	Sierra On-Line	
1990	Red Baron	Amiga, MS-DOS, Mac	Dynamix	Sierra On-Line	
1990	Rise of the Dragon	Amiga, MS-DOS, Mac, Sega CD	Dynamix, Game Arts (Sega CD)	Sierra On-Line	
1990	Sorcerian	MS-DOS	Nihon Falcom	Sierra On-Line	
1990	Zeliard	PC-88, Sharp X1, MS-DOS	Game Arts	Game Arts, Sierra On-Line (Overseas)	
1991	The Adventures of Willy Beamish	Amiga, MS-DOS, Mac, Sega CD	Dynamix	Sierra On-Line	
1991	Castle of Dr. Brain	Amiga, MS-DOS, Mac, PC-98	Sierra On-Line	Sierra On-Line	
1991	Conquests of the Longbow: The Legend of Robin Hood	MS-DOS, Amiga	Sierra On-Line	Sierra On-Line	
1991	EcoQuest: The Search for Cetus	MS-DOS	Sierra On-Line	Sierra On-Line	
1991	Gobliiins	Amiga, Atari ST, MS-DOS, Mac	Coktel Vision	Coktel Vision, Sierra On-Line	
1991	Heart of China	Amiga, MS-DOS, Mac	Dynamix	Sierra On-Line	
1991	Hoyle's Official Book of Games: Volume 3	MS-DOS, Amiga	Sierra Entertainment	Sierra Entertainment	
1991	Jones in the Fast Lane	MS-DOS	Sierra Entertainment	Sierra Entertainment	
July 1991	Leisure Suit Larry in the Land of the Lounge Lizards (SCI remake)	Amiga, MS-DOS, Mac	Sierra On-Line	Sierra On-Line	
September 7, 1991	Leisure Suit Larry 5: Passionate Patti Does a Little Undercover Work	MS-DOS, Amiga, Mac, Windows	Sierra On-Line	Sierra On-Line	
1991	Mixed-Up Fairy Tales	MS-DOS	Sierra On-Line	Sierra On-Line	
1991	Nova 9: The Return of Gir Draxon	Amiga, MS-DOS	Dynamix	Sierra On-Line	
1991	Police Quest III: The Kindred	Amiga, MS-DOS	Sierra On-Line	Sierra On-Line	
1991	Mixed-Up Mother Goose (SCI remake)	Amiga, MS-DOS	Sierra On-Line	Sierra On-Line	
1991	Mixed-Up Mother Goose (VGA remake)	Amiga, MS-DOS, FM Towns, Windows 3.x	Sierra On-Line	Sierra On-Line	
March 4, 1991	Space Quest IV: Roger Wilco and the Time Rippers	MS-DOS, Windows 3.x, Mac, Amiga, PC-98	Sierra On-Line	Sierra On-Line	
August 20, 1991	Space Quest: The Sarien Encounter (SCI remake)	MS-DOS, Mac, Amiga	Sierra On-Line	Sierra On-Line	
1991	Stellar 7 (remake of 1982 non-Sierra version)	Amiga, MS-DOS, Mac	Dynamix	Sierra On-Line	
1991	Red Baron: Mission Builder	MS-DOS	Dynamix	Sierra On-Line	
1992	Aces of the Pacific	MS-DOS, Amiga	Dynamix	Sierra Entertainment	
1992	Air Bucks	Amiga, Atari ST, MS-DOS	Impressions Games	Sierra On-Line	
October 12, 1992	Caesar	Amiga, Atari ST, MS-DOS	Impressions Games	Sierra On-Line	
1992	The Dagger of Amon Ra	MS-DOS, Windows, Windows 3.x	Sierra On-Line	Sierra On-Line	
1992	The Incredible Machine	MS-DOS, FM Towns, Mac, PC-98, 3DO	Jeff Tunnell Productions	Sierra On-Line	
1992	Front Page Sports Football	MS-DOS	Dynamix	Sierra On-Line	
1992	Gobliins 2: The Prince Buffoon	Amiga, Atari ST, MS-DOS	Coktel Vision	Sierra On-Line	
1992	The Island of Dr. Brain	MS-DOS	Sierra On-Line	Sierra On-Line	
October 13, 1992	King's Quest VI: Heir Today, Gone Tomorrow	MS-DOS, Windows 3.x, Mac, Amiga	Sierra On-Line, Revolution Software (Amiga)	Sierra On-Line	
1992	Mega Math	MS-DOS	Jeff Tunnell Productions	Sierra On-Line	
1992	Police Quest I: In Pursuit of the Death Angel (SCI Remake)	MS-DOS	Sierra On-Line	Sierra On-Line	
1992	Quarky & Quaysoo's Turbo Science	MS-DOS	Jeff Tunnell Productions	Sierra On-Line	
1992	Quest for Glory: So You Want to Be a Hero (SCI Remake)	MS-DOS, Mac	Sierra On-Line	Sierra On-Line	
August 1992	Quest for Glory III: Wages of War	MS-DOS	Sierra On-Line	Sierra On-Line	
1992	Shadow of Yserbius	MS-DOS	Ybarra Productions	Sierra On-Line	
1992	Take a Break! Crosswords	Mac, Windows 3.x	Dynamix, N8 Productions	Sierra On-Line	
1992	WWII: 1946	MS-DOS	Sierra On-Line	Sierra On-Line	
1993	Crazy Nick's Picks - King Graham's Board Game Challenge	MS-DOS	Sierra On-Line	Sierra On-Line	
1993	Crazy Nick's Picks - Parlor Games with Laura Bow	MS-DOS	Sierra On-Line	Sierra On-Line	
1993	Alphabet Blocks	Windows 3.x	Bright Star Technology	Sierra On-Line	
1993	Beginning Reading	Windows 3.x	Bright Star Technology	Sierra On-Line	
1993	Ready, Set, Read	Windows 3.x	Bright Star Technology	Sierra On-Line	
1993	Early Math	Windows 3.x	Bright Star Technology	Sierra On-Line	
1993	Kid's Typing	Windows 3.x, Mac	Bright Star Technology	Sierra On-Line	
1993	Spelling Jungle	Mac, Windows 3.x	Bright Star Technology	Sierra On-Line	
1993	Aces Over Europe	MS-DOS	Dynamix	Sierra On-Line	
June 22, 1993	Raymond E. Feist's Betrayal at Krondor	MS-DOS	Dynamix	Sierra On-Line	
November 1993	Police Quest IV: Open Season	MS-DOS, Mac, Windows 3.x	Sierra On-Line	Sierra On-Line	
1993	EcoQuest 2: Lost Secret of the Rainforest	MS-DOS, Windows 3.x	Sierra On-Line	Sierra On-Line	
1993	Fates of Twinion	MS-DOS	Sierra On-Line	Sierra On-Line	
1993	Freddy Pharkas: Frontier Pharmacist	MS-DOS, Mac, Windows 3.x	Sierra On-Line	Sierra On-Line	
1993	Goblins Quest 3	Amiga, MS-DOS	Coktel Vision	Sierra On-Line	
February 5, 1993	Space Quest V: Roger Wilco in the Next Mutation	MS-DOS	Dynamix	Sierra On-Line	
1993	Inca	CD-i, MS-DOS	Coktel Vision	Sierra On-Line	
1993	Inca II: Nations of Immortality	MS-DOS	Coktel Vision	Sierra On-Line	
May 19, 1993	Slater & Charlie Go Camping	MS-DOS, Mac	Sierra On-Line	Sierra On-Line	
1993	The Even More Incredible Machine	MS-DOS, Mac, Windows 3.x	Dynamix	Sierra On-Line	
June 15, 1993	Leisure Suit Larry 6: Shape Up or Slip Out!	MS-DOS, Windows, Windows 3.x, Mac	Sierra On-Line	Sierra On-Line	
1993	Pepper's Adventures in Time	MS-DOS, Windows 3.x	Sierra On-Line	Sierra On-Line	
1993	The Prophecy	MS-DOS, Amiga, Atari ST	Coktel Vision	Sierra On-Line	
December 1993	Quest for Glory: Shadows of Darkness	MS-DOS, Windows 3.x	Sierra On-Line	Sierra On-Line	
1993	Sid & Al's Incredible Toons	MS-DOS, Mac	Jeff Tunnell Productions	Sierra On-Line	
1993	Take a Break! Pinball	Windows	Dynamix	Sierra On-Line	
December 17, 1993	Gabriel Knight: Sins of the Fathers	MS-DOS, Mac, Windows	Sierra On-Line	Sierra On-Line	
April 7, 1995	The Bizarre Adventures of Woodruff and the Schnibble	Windows	Coktel Vision	Sierra On-Line	
August 1995	Roberta Williams' Phantasmagoria	Mac	Sierra On-Line	Sierra On-Line	
December 1995	Daryl F. Gates' Police Quest: SWAT	Mac	Sierra On-Line	Sierra On-Line	
1995	3-D Ultra Pinball	Mac	Dynamix	Sierra On-Line	
1995	3-D Ultra Pinball	Windows	Dynamix	Sierra On-Line	
1995	Aces of the Deep: Expansion Disk	MS-DOS	Dynamix	Sierra On-Line	
1995	Caesar II	MS-DOS	Impressions Games	Sierra On-Line	
1995	Conqueror: A.D. 1086	MS-DOS	Software Sorcery	Sierra On-Line	
1995	Daryl F. Gates' Police Quest: SWAT	MS-DOS	Sierra On-Line	Sierra On-Line	
1995	Daryl F. Gates' Police Quest: SWAT	Windows	Sierra On-Line	Sierra On-Line	
1995	Front Page Sports: Football Pro '96 Season	MS-DOS	Dynamix	Sierra On-Line	
1995	Hoyle Classic Games	Windows	Sierra On-Line	Sierra On-Line	
1995	Lode Runner On-Line: The Mad Monks' Revenge	Mac	Presage Software	Sierra On-Line	
1995	Lode Runner On-Line: The Mad Monks' Revenge	Windows	Presage Software	Sierra On-Line	
1995	Metaltech: EarthSiege - Expansion Pack	MS-DOS	Dynamix	Sierra On-Line	
1995	Roberta Williams' Phantasmagoria	MS-DOS	Sierra On-Line	Sierra On-Line	
1995	Roberta Williams' Phantasmagoria	Windows	Sierra On-Line	Sierra On-Line	
1995	Ruins of Cawdor	MS-DOS	Ybarra Productions	Sierra On-Line	
1995	Shivers	Windows	Sierra On-Line	Sierra On-Line	
1995	Space Quest 6: Roger Wilco in the Spinal Frontier	MS-DOS	Sierra On-Line	Sierra On-Line	
1995	Space Quest 6: Roger Wilco in the Spinal Frontier	Windows	Sierra On-Line	Sierra On-Line	
1995	The Beast Within: A Gabriel Knight Mystery	MS-DOS	Sierra On-Line	Sierra On-Line	
1995	The Beast Within: A Gabriel Knight Mystery	Windows	Sierra On-Line	Sierra On-Line	
1995	The Last Dynasty	Windows	Coktel Vision	Sierra On-Line	
1995	The Lost Mind of Dr. Brain	Mac	Sierra On-Line	Sierra On-Line	
1995	The Lost Mind of Dr. Brain	Windows	Sierra On-Line	Sierra On-Line	
1995	Thexder	Windows	Synergistic Software	Sierra On-Line	
1995	Torin's Passage	MS-DOS	Sierra On-Line	Sierra On-Line	
1995	Torin's Passage	Mac	Sierra On-Line	Sierra On-Line	
1995	Torin's Passage	Windows	Sierra On-Line	Sierra On-Line	
1995	Trophy Bass	Mac	Dynamix	Sierra On-Line	
1995	Trophy Bass	Windows	Dynamix	Sierra On-Line	
1995	You Don't Know Jack	Mac	Jellyvision Games, Berkeley Systems	Sierra On-Line	
1995	You Don't Know Jack	Windows	Jellyvision Games, Berkeley Systems	Sierra On-Line	
March 18, 1996	The Rise & Rule of Ancient Empires	Windows	Impressions Games	Sierra On-Line	
1996	The Realm Online (Note: At its peak, it had over 25,000 players. Ken Williams acted as Executive Producer of the Realm from its release until late 1998.)	Windows	Yosemite Entertainment	Sierra On-Line	
March 19, 1996	EarthSiege 2	Windows	Dynamix	Sierra On-Line	
June 1996	Hoyle Solitaire	Windows	Sierra On-Line	Sierra On-Line	
August 16, 1996	3-D Ultra Pinball: Creep Night	Mac	Dynamix	Sierra On-Line	
September 10, 1996	Caesar II	Windows	Impressions Games	Sierra On-Line	
September 23, 1996	3-D Ultra Pinball: Creep Night	Windows	Dynamix	Sierra On-Line	
September 30, 1996	Front Page Sports: Trophy Bass 2	Windows	Dynamix	Sierra On-Line	
October 1996	Rama	MS-DOS	Dynamix	Sierra On-Line	
November 1996	Hunter Hunted	Windows	Dynamix	Sierra On-Line	
1996	Birthright: The Gorgon's Alliance	MS-DOS	Synergistic Software	Sierra On-Line	
1996	Birthright: The Gorgon's Alliance	Windows	Synergistic Software	Sierra On-Line	
1996	Caesar II	Mac	Impressions Games	Sierra On-Line	
1996	Casino Deluxe 2	Windows	Impressions Games	Sierra On-Line	
1996	CyberGladiators	Windows	Dynamix	Sierra On-Line	
1996	Fast Attack: High Tech Submarine Warfare	MS-DOS	Software Sorcery	Sierra On-Line	
1996	Front Page Sports: Baseball Pro '96 Season	Windows	Dynamix	Sierra On-Line	
1996	Front Page Sports: Football Pro '97	Windows	Synergistic Software, Dynamix	Sierra On-Line	
1996	Hoyle Blackjack	Windows	Sierra On-Line	Sierra On-Line	
1996	Hoyle Bridge	Windows	Sierra On-Line	Sierra On-Line	
1996	Hoyle Casino	Windows	Sierra On-Line	Sierra On-Line	
1996	Hoyle Children's Collection	Windows	Sierra On-Line	Sierra On-Line	
1996	Hoyle Classic Games	Mac	Sierra On-Line	Sierra On-Line	
1996	IndyCar Racing II	MS-DOS	Papyrus Design Group	Sierra On-Line	
1996	IndyCar Racing II	Mac	Papyrus Design Group	Sierra On-Line	
1996	IndyCar Racing II	Windows	Papyrus Design Group	Sierra On-Line	
1996	Leisure Suit Larry: Love for Sail!	MS-DOS	Sierra On-Line	Sierra On-Line	
1996	Leisure Suit Larry: Love for Sail!	Windows	Sierra On-Line	Sierra On-Line	
1996	Lighthouse: The Dark Being	MS-DOS	Sierra On-Line	Sierra On-Line	
1996	Lighthouse: The Dark Being	Mac	Sierra On-Line	Sierra On-Line	
1996	Lighthouse: The Dark Being	Windows	Sierra On-Line	Sierra On-Line	
1996	Lords of the Realm II	MS-DOS	Impressions Games	Sierra On-Line	
1996	Lords of the Realm II	Mac	Impressions Games	Sierra On-Line	
1996	Lords of the Realm II	Windows	Impressions Games	Sierra On-Line	
1996	MissionForce: CyberStorm	Windows	Dynamix	Sierra On-Line	
1996	NASCAR Racing	PlayStation	Papyrus Design Group	Sierra On-Line	
1996	NASCAR Racing 2	MS-DOS	Papyrus Design Group	Sierra On-Line	
1996	Phantasmagoria: A Puzzle of Flesh	MS-DOS	Sierra On-Line	Sierra On-Line	
1996	Phantasmagoria: A Puzzle of Flesh	Windows	Sierra On-Line	Sierra On-Line	
1996	Power Chess	Windows	Sierra On-Line	Sierra On-Line	
1996	Rama	Windows	Dynamix	Sierra On-Line	
1996	Robert E. Lee: Civil War General	Windows	Impressions Games	Sierra On-Line	
1996	Shivers	Mac	Sierra On-Line	Sierra On-Line	
1996	Silent Thunder: A-10 Tank Killer II	Windows	Dynamix	Sierra On-Line	
1996	Space Bucks	Windows	Impressions Games	Sierra On-Line	
1996	Space Quest 6: Roger Wilco in the Spinal Frontier	Mac	Sierra On-Line	Sierra On-Line	
1996	Stay Tooned!	Mac	Funnybone Interactive	Sierra On-Line	
1996	Stay Tooned!	Windows	Funnybone Interactive	Sierra On-Line	
1996	The Beast Within: A Gabriel Knight Mystery	Mac	Sierra On-Line	Sierra On-Line	
1996	The Time Warp of Dr. Brain	Mac	Sierra On-Line	Sierra On-Line	
1996	The Time Warp of Dr. Brain	Windows	Sierra On-Line	Sierra On-Line	
1996	Total Meltdown	MS-DOS	Synergistic Software	Sierra On-Line	
1996	Ultimate Soccer Manager 2	Windows	Impressions Games	Sierra On-Line	
1996	Urban Runner	Windows	Coktel Vision	Sierra On-Line	
1996	You Don't Know Jack: Volume 2	Windows	Berkeley Systems, Jellyvision Games	Sierra On-Line	
January 8, 1997	Rama	Mac	Dynamix	Sierra On-Line	
January 18, 1997	Leisure Suit Larry: Love for Sail!	Mac	Sierra On-Line	Sierra On-Line	
April 30, 1997	Hoyle Poker	Windows	Sierra On-Line	Sierra On-Line	
May 1997	The Realm	Windows	Sierra On-Line	Sierra On-Line	
October 1997	Grant - Lee - Sherman: Civil War 2 - Generals	Windows	Impressions Games	Sierra On-Line	
November 3, 1997	Front Page Sports: Football Pro '98	Windows	Synergistic Software	Sierra On-Line	
November 3, 1997	NASCAR: Grand National Series Expansion Pack	Windows	Papyrus Design Group	Sierra On-Line	
November 3, 1997	Power Chess 98	Windows	Sierra On-Line	Sierra On-Line	
November 4, 1997	CART Racing	MS-DOS	Papyrus Design Group	Sierra On-Line	
November 4, 1997	CART Racing	Windows	Papyrus Design Group	Sierra On-Line	
November 19, 1997	Lords of Magic	Windows	Impressions Games	Sierra On-Line	
November 24, 1997	Diablo: Hellfire	Windows	Synergistic Software	Sierra On-Line	
December 1997	SODA Off-Road Racing	Windows	Software Allies	Sierra On-Line	
1997	3-D Ultra Minigolf	Windows	Dynamix	Sierra On-Line	
1997	3-D Ultra Pinball: The Lost Continent	Mac	Dynamix	Sierra On-Line	
1997	3-D Ultra Pinball: The Lost Continent	Windows	Dynamix	Sierra On-Line	
1997	Betrayal in Antara	Windows	Sierra On-Line	Sierra On-Line	
1997	Eat My Dust	Windows	Davidson & Associates, Van Duyne Engineering	Sierra On-Line	
1997	Front Page Sports: Baseball Pro '98	Windows	Dynamix	Sierra On-Line	
1997	Front Page Sports: Golf	Windows	Headgate Studios	Sierra On-Line	
1997	Front Page Sports: Ski Racing	Windows	Dynamix	Sierra On-Line	
1997	Front Page Sports: Trophy Rivers	Windows	Dynamix	Sierra On-Line	
1997	Hoyle Classic Board Games	Windows	Sierra On-Line	Sierra On-Line	
1997	Hoyle Solitaire	Mac	Sierra On-Line	Sierra On-Line	
1997	Lords of the Realm II: Siege Pack	Windows	Impressions Games	Sierra On-Line	
1997	Outpost 2: Divided Destiny	Windows	Dynamix	Sierra On-Line	
1997	Red Baron II	Windows	Dynamix	Sierra On-Line	
1997	Red Baron with Mission Builder	MS-DOS	Dynamix	Sierra On-Line	
1997	Red Baron with Mission Builder	Windows	Dynamix	Sierra On-Line	
1997	Shivers II: Harvest of Souls	Windows	Sierra On-Line	Sierra On-Line	
1997	Sierra Pro Pilot 98: The Complete Flight Simulator	Windows	Dynamix	Sierra On-Line	
1997	You Don't Know Jack: Volume 3	Mac	Berkeley Systems, Jellyvision Games	Sierra On-Line	
1997	You Don't Know Jack: Volume 3	Windows	Berkeley Systems, Jellyvision Games	Sierra On-Line	
June 1998	Cyberstorm 2: Corporate Wars	Windows	Dynamix	Sierra On-Line	
July 1, 1998	3-D Ultra MiniGolf Deluxe	Windows	Dynamix	Sierra On-Line	
July 17, 1998	Leisure Suit Larry's Casino	Windows	Sierra On-Line	Sierra On-Line	
July 25, 1998	Police Quest: SWAT 2	Windows	Yosemite Entertainment	Sierra On-Line	
September 30, 1998	Caesar III	Windows	Impressions Games	Sierra On-Line	
October 2, 1998	Pro Pilot USA	Windows	Dynamix	Sierra On-Line	
October 31, 1998	Red Baron 3-D	Windows	Dynamix	Sierra On-Line	
November 10, 1998	Sierra Sports: Skiing 1999 Edition	Windows	Sierra On-Line	Sierra Sports	
November 19, 1998	Half-Life	Windows	Valve	Sierra On-Line	
November 30, 1998	Return to Krondor	Windows	PyroTechnix	Sierra On-Line	
December 23, 1998	Starsiege: Tribes	Windows	Dynamix	Sierra On-Line	
1998	3-D Ultra NASCAR Pinball	Windows	Dynamix	Sierra On-Line	
February 1999	3-D Ultra NASCAR Pinball	Mac	Dynamix	Sierra On-Line	
1998	After Dark Games	Mac	Berkeley Systems	Sierra On-Line	
1998	After Dark Games	Windows	Berkeley Systems	Sierra On-Line	
1998	Driver's Education '98	Windows	Dynamix	Sierra On-Line	
1998	Grand Prix Legends	Windows	Papyrus Design Group	Sierra On-Line	
1998	Head Rush	Mac	Berkeley Systems, Jellyvision Games	Sierra On-Line	
1998	Head Rush	Windows	Berkeley Systems, Jellyvision Games	Sierra On-Line	
1998	Hoyle Board Games	Windows	Sierra On-Line	Sierra On-Line	
1998	King's Quest: Mask of Eternity	Windows	Sierra On-Line	Sierra On-Line	
1998	Lords of Magic: Legends of Urak	Windows	Impressions Games	Sierra On-Line	
1998	PGA Championship Golf	Windows	Headgate Studios	Sierra On-Line	
1998	Pro Pilot 99	Windows	Dynamix	Sierra On-Line	
1998	Quest for Glory V: Dragon Fire	Mac	Yosemite Entertainment	Sierra On-Line	
1998	Quest for Glory V: Dragon Fire	Windows	Yosemite Entertainment	Sierra On-Line	
1998	Ultimate Soccer Manager 98	Windows	Impressions Games	Sierra On-Line	
1998	Viper Racing	Windows	Monster Games	Sierra On-Line	
1998	You Don't Know Jack: Volume 4 - The Ride	Mac	Berkeley Systems, Jellyvision Games	Sierra On-Line	
1998	You Don't Know Jack: Volume 4 - The Ride	Windows	Berkeley Systems, Jellyvision Games	Sierra On-Line	
February 12, 1999	Half-Life: Uplink	Windows	Valve	Sierra	
March 24, 1999	Starsiege	Windows	Dynamix	Sierra On-Line	
June 1, 1999	PGA Championship Golf: 1999 Edition	Windows	Headgate Studios	Sierra On-Line	
June 16, 1999	Field & Stream: Trophy Bass 3D	Windows	Dynamix	Sierra On-Line	
June 1999	Hoyle Board Games	Mac	Sierra On-Line	Sierra On-Line	
September 28, 1999	Homeworld	Windows	Relic Entertainment	Sierra On-Line	
October 1999	You Don't Know Jack	PlayStation	Jellyvision Games, Starsphere Interactive	Sierra On-Line	
November 5, 1999	Pharaoh	Windows	Impressions Games	Sierra On-Line	
November 15, 1999	3-D Ultra Radio Control Racers	Windows	Dynamix	Sierra On-Line	
November 18, 1999	Half-Life: Opposing Force	Windows	Gearbox Software	Sierra On-Line	
November 19, 1999	Gabriel Knight 3: Blood of the Sacred, Blood of the Damned	Windows	Sierra On-Line	Sierra On-Line	
November 23, 1999	SWAT 3: Close Quarters Battle	Windows	Sierra On-Line	Sierra On-Line	
1999	3-D Ultra Cool Pool	Windows	Dynamix	Sierra On-Line	
1999	Austin Powers: Operation – Trivia	Mac	Berkeley Systems	Sierra On-Line	
1999	Austin Powers: Operation – Trivia	Windows	Berkeley Systems	Sierra On-Line	
1999	Caesar III	Mac	Impressions Games	Sierra On-Line	
1999	Curse You! Red Baron	Windows	Dynamix	Sierra On-Line	
1999	Field & Stream: Trophy Buck	Windows	Engineering Animation	Sierra On-Line	
1999	Hoyle Card Games	Mac	Sierra On-Line	Sierra On-Line	
1999	Hoyle Card Games	Windows	Sierra On-Line	Sierra On-Line	
1999	Hoyle Backgammon & Cribbage	Mac	Sierra On-Line	Sierra On-Line	
1999	Hoyle Backgammon & Cribbage	Windows	Sierra On-Line	Sierra On-Line	
1999	Hoyle Word Games	Mac	Sierra On-Line	Sierra On-Line	
1999	Hoyle Word Games	Windows	Sierra On-Line	Sierra On-Line	
1999	NASCAR Craftsman Truck Series Racing	Windows	Papyrus Design Group	Sierra On-Line	
1999	NASCAR Legends	Windows	Papyrus Design Group	Sierra On-Line	
1999	NASCAR Racing 3	Windows	Papyrus Design Group	Sierra On-Line	
1999	NASCAR Racing: 1999 Edition	Windows	Papyrus Design Group	Sierra On-Line	
1999	Professional Bull Rider	Windows	Sierra On-Line	Sierra On-Line	
1999	Team Fortress Classic	Windows	Valve	Sierra On-Line	
1999	Ultimate Soccer Manager 98-99	Windows	Impressions Games	Sierra On-Line	
1999	Wordox	Browser	Sierra On-Line	Sierra On-Line	
1999	You Don't Know Jack: Offline	Mac	Berkeley Systems, Jellyvision Games	Sierra On-Line	
1999	You Don't Know Jack: Offline	Windows	Berkeley Systems, Jellyvision Games	Sierra On-Line	
June 1, 2000	Ground Control	Windows	Massive Entertainment	Sierra On-Line	
July 12, 2000	Cleopatra: Queen of the Nile	Windows	BreakAway Games	Sierra On-Line	
August 7, 2000	Hoyle Kids Games	Mac	Sierra On-Line	Sierra On-Line	
August 7, 2000	Hoyle Kids Games	Windows	Sierra On-Line	Sierra On-Line	
September 12, 2000	Homeworld: Cataclysm	Windows	Barking Dog Studios	Sierra On-Line	
September 14, 2000	Maximum Pool	Mac	Dynamix	Sierra On-Line	
September 14, 2000	Maximum Pool	Windows	Dynamix	Sierra On-Line	
September 21, 2000	Field & Stream: Trophy Hunting 4	Windows	Dynamix	Sierra On-Line	
September 30, 2000	3-D Ultra Lionel Train Town Deluxe	Windows	Dynamix	Sierra On-Line	
October 17, 2000	Zeus: Master of Olympus	Windows	Impressions Games	Sierra On-Line	
October 2000	Hoyle Casino	Game Boy Color	Pulsar Interactive	Sierra On-Line	
November 6, 2000	You Don't Know Jack: Mock 2	PlayStation	Jellyvision Games, Starsphere Interactive	Sierra On-Line	
November 16, 2000	Maximum Pool	Dreamcast	Dynamix	Sierra On-Line	
November 20, 2000	Gunman Chronicles	Windows	Rewolf Entertainment, Valve	Sierra On-Line	
December 1, 2000	Hoyle Card Games	Game Boy Color	Sandbox Studios	Sierra On-Line	
December 2000	Ground Control: Dark Conspiracy	Windows	High Voltage Software, Massive Entertainment	Sierra On-Line	
2000	3-D Ultra Pinball: Thrillride	Mac	Dynamix	Sierra On-Line	
2000	3-D Ultra Pinball: Thrillride	Windows	Dynamix	Sierra On-Line	
December 2000	3-D Ultra Pinball: Thrillride	Game Boy Color	Left Field Productions	Sierra On-Line	
2000	Field & Stream: Trophy Bass 4	Windows	Dynamix	Sierra On-Line	
2000	Hoyle Board Games 2001	Mac	Sierra On-Line	Sierra On-Line	
2000	Hoyle Board Games 2001	Windows	Sierra On-Line	Sierra On-Line	
2000	Hoyle Casino	Dreamcast	Sierra On-Line	Sierra On-Line	
2000	Hoyle Casino	Mac	Sierra On-Line	Sierra On-Line	
2000	Hoyle Casino	Windows	Sierra On-Line	Sierra On-Line	
2000	Hoyle Crosswords	Mac	Sierra On-Line	Sierra On-Line	
2000	Hoyle Crosswords	Windows	Sierra On-Line	Sierra On-Line	
2000	Hoyle Mahjong Tiles	Mac	Sierra On-Line	Sierra On-Line	
2000	Hoyle Mahjong Tiles	Windows	Sierra On-Line	Sierra On-Line	
2000	PGA Championship Golf 2000	Windows	Headgate Studios	Sierra Sports	
2000	Professional Bull Rider 2	Windows	Sierra On-Line	Sierra On-Line	
2000	RC Racers II	Windows	Dynamix	Sierra On-Line	
2000	Return of the Incredible Machine: Contraptions	Mac	Dynamix	Sierra On-Line	
2000	Return of the Incredible Machine: Contraptions	Windows	Dynamix	Sierra On-Line	
2000	You Don't Know Jack: 5th Dementia	Windows	Jellyvision Games	Sierra On-Line	
2000	You Don't Know Jack: Louder! Faster! Funnier!	Mac	Berkeley Systems	Sierra On-Line	
2000	You Don't Know Jack: Louder! Faster! Funnier!	Windows	Berkeley Systems	Sierra On-Line	
March 29, 2001	Tribes 2	Windows	Dynamix	Sierra On-Line	
April 19, 2001	Tribes 2	Linux	Loki Entertainment	Sierra On-Line	
May 1, 2001	Hoyle Slots	Mac	Sierra On-Line	Sierra On-Line	
May 1, 2001	Hoyle Slots	Windows	Sierra On-Line	Sierra On-Line	
June 12, 2001	Half-Life: Blue Shift	Windows	Gearbox Software	Sierra On-Line	
June 22, 2001	Poseidon: Zeus Official Expansion	Windows	Impressions Games	Sierra On-Line	
August 21, 2001	Arcanum: Of Steamworks & Magick Obscura	Windows	Troika Games	Sierra On-Line	
August 30, 2001	Hoyle Casino	Windows	Sierra On-Line	Sierra On-Line	
September 25, 2001	Throne of Darkness	Windows	Click Entertainment	Sierra On-Line	
October 2, 2001	SWAT 3: Tactical Game of the Year Edition	Windows	Sierra On-Line	Sierra On-Line	
October 3, 2001	The Operative: No One Lives Forever – Game of the Year Edition	Windows	Monolith Productions, Third Law Interactive	Sierra On-Line	
October 22, 2001	Aliens Versus Predator 2	Windows	Monolith Productions	Sierra On-Line	
October 29, 2001	Half-Life	PlayStation 2	Gearbox Software	Sierra On-Line	
November 13, 2001	Empire Earth	Windows	Stainless Steel Studios	Sierra On-Line	
November 14, 2001	Half-Life: Decay	PlayStation 2	Gearbox Software	Sierra On-Line	
December 6, 2001	Elfenwelt	Windows	MadCat Interactive	Sierra On-Line	
2001	NASCAR Racing 4	Windows	Papyrus Design Group	Sierra On-Line	
2001	The $100,000 Pyramid	Windows	Hypnotix	Sierra On-Line	
2001	The Incredible Machine: Even More Contraptions	Mac	Dynamix	Sierra	
2001	The Incredible Machine: Even More Contraptions	Windows	Dynamix	Sierra	
April 17, 2002	The Operative: No One Lives Forever	PlayStation 2	Monolith Productions	Sierra	
April 24, 2002	Die Hard: Nakatomi Plaza	Windows	Piranha Games	Sierra	
August 29, 2002	Aliens Versus Predator 2: Primal Hunt	Windows	Third Law Interactive	Sierra	
September 10, 2002	Emperor: Rise of the Middle Kingdom	Windows	BreakAway Games, Impressions Games	Sierra	
September 16, 2002	Empire Earth: The Art of Conquest	Windows	Mad Doc Software	Sierra	
September 23, 2002	Hoyle Casino Empire	Windows	Sierra Entertainment	Sierra	
September 23, 2002	Tribes: Aerial Assault	PlayStation 2	Inevitable Entertainment	Sierra	
October 5, 2002	No One Lives Forever 2: A Spy in H.A.R.M.'s Way	Windows	Monolith Productions	Sierra	
November 18, 2002	Die Hard: Vendetta	GameCube	Bits Studios	Sierra	
November 18, 2002	James Cameron's Dark Angel	Windows	Radical Entertainment	Sierra	
November 20, 2002	James Cameron's Dark Angel	Xbox	Radical Entertainment	Sierra	
2002	Dell Magazines Crosswords	Mac	Sierra Entertainment	Sierra	
2002	Dell Magazines Crosswords	Windows	Sierra Entertainment	Sierra	
2002	Hoyle Card Games	Mac	Sierra Entertainment	Sierra	
2002	Hoyle Card Games	Windows	Sierra Entertainment	Sierra	
February 14, 2003	NASCAR Racing 2003 Season	Windows	Papyrus Design Group	Sierra	
August 15, 2003	Hoyle Majestic Chess	Windows	Fluent Entertainment, Sidhe Interactive	Sierra	
September 2, 2003	Hoyle Casino 2004	Windows	Sierra Entertainment	Sierra	
September 2, 2003	Hoyle Table Games 2004	Windows	Buzz Monkey Software	Sierra	
September 16, 2003	Homeworld 2	Windows	Relic Entertainment	Sierra	
October 28, 2003	SWAT: Global Strike Team	PlayStation 2	Argonaut Games	Sierra	
October 28, 2003	SWAT: Global Strike Team	Xbox	Argonaut Games	Sierra	
November 4, 2003	The Lord of the Rings: War of the Ring	Windows	Liquid Entertainment	Sierra	
November 11, 2003	Contract J.A.C.K.	Windows	Monolith Productions	Sierra	
November 11, 2003	The Hobbit	Game Boy Advance	Saffire	Sierra	
November 11, 2003	The Hobbit	Windows	The Fizz Factor	Sierra	
November 12, 2003	The Hobbit	GameCube	Inevitable Entertainment	Sierra	
November 12, 2003	The Hobbit	PlayStation 2	Inevitable Entertainment	Sierra	
November 12, 2003	The Hobbit	Xbox	Inevitable Entertainment	Sierra	
November 19, 2003	Metal Arms: Glitch in the System	GameCube	Swingin' Ape Studios	Sierra	
November 19, 2003	Metal Arms: Glitch in the System	PlayStation 2	Mass Media Games	Sierra	
November 19, 2003	Metal Arms: Glitch in the System	Xbox	Swingin' Ape Studios	Sierra	
March 17, 2004	Lords of the Realm III	Windows	Impressions Games	Sierra	
March 21, 2004	Counter-Strike: Condition Zero	Windows	Valve, Turtle Rock Studios, Ritual Entertainment	Sierra	
September 28, 2004	Evil Genius	Windows	Elixir Studios	Sierra	
October 5, 2004	Disney's Aladdin Chess Adventures	Windows	Fluent Entertainment	Sierra	
October 5, 2004	Tribes: Vengeance	Windows	Irrational Games	Sierra	
November 1, 2004	Counter-Strike: Source	Windows	Valve	Sierra	
November 16, 2004	Half-Life 2	Windows	Valve	Sierra	
February 24, 2005	Nexus: The Jupiter Incident	Windows	Mithis Games	Sierra	
April 5, 2005	SWAT 4	Windows	Irrational Games	Sierra	
April 26, 2005	Empire Earth II	Windows	Mad Doc Software	Sierra	
April 26, 2005	Predator: Concrete Jungle	PlayStation 2	Eurocom	Sierra	
April 26, 2005	Predator: Concrete Jungle	Xbox	Eurocom	Sierra	
October 18, 2005	Spyro: Shadow Legacy	Nintendo DS	Amaze Entertainment	Sierra	
October 19, 2005	Crash Tag Team Racing	GameCube	Radical Entertainment	Sierra	
October 19, 2005	Crash Tag Team Racing	PlayStation 2	Radical Entertainment	Sierra	
October 20, 2005	Crash Tag Team Racing	Xbox	Radical Entertainment	Sierra	
November 10, 2005	Crash Tag Team Racing	PlayStation Portable	Radical Entertainment	Sierra	
2005	Hoyle Poker Series	Windows	Sierra Entertainment	Encore Software	
February 14, 2006	Empire Earth II: The Art of Supremacy	Windows	Mad Doc Software	Sierra	
February 28, 2006	SWAT 4: The Stetchkov Syndicate	Windows	Irrational Games	Sierra	
March 14, 2006	Ice Age 2: The Meltdown	GameCube	Eurocom	Sierra	
March 14, 2006	Ice Age 2: The Meltdown	PlayStation 2	Eurocom	Sierra	
March 14, 2006	Ice Age 2: The Meltdown	Xbox	Eurocom	Sierra	
August 17, 2006	F.E.A.R.: Combat	Windows	Monolith Productions	Sierra	
September 12, 2006	Joint Task Force	Windows	Most Wanted Entertainment	Sierra	
September 26, 2006	Caesar IV	Windows	Tilted Mill Entertainment	Sierra	
October 8, 2006	Scarface: The World Is Yours	PlayStation 2	Radical Entertainment	Sierra	
October 10, 2006	Crash Boom Bang!	Nintendo DS	Dimps, Hyde	Sierra	
October 10, 2006	Scarface: The World Is Yours	Windows	Radical Entertainment	Sierra	
October 10, 2006	The Legend of Spyro: A New Beginning	GameCube	Krome Studios	Sierra	
October 10, 2006	The Legend of Spyro: A New Beginning	PlayStation 2	Krome Studios	Sierra	
October 10, 2006	The Legend of Spyro: A New Beginning	Xbox	Krome Studios	Sierra	
October 12, 2006	The Legend of Spyro: A New Beginning	Game Boy Advance	Big Ant Studios, Krome Studios	Sierra	
October 17, 2006	The Legend of Spyro: A New Beginning	Nintendo DS	Amaze Entertainment, Krome Studios	Sierra	
October 2006	Scarface: The World Is Yours	Xbox	Radical Entertainment	Sierra	
November 14, 2006	Eragon	Nintendo DS	Amaze Entertainment	Sierra	
November 17, 2006	Eragon	Game Boy Advance	Amaze Entertainment	Sierra	
November 21, 2006	Delta Force: Black Hawk Down – Team Sabre	PlayStation 2	Rebellion Developments	Sierra	
December 5, 2006	Ice Age 2: The Meltdown	Wii	Eurocom	Sierra	
December 13, 2006	Assault Heroes	Xbox Live Arcade	Wanako Studios	Sierra Online	
December 20, 2006	3D Ultra Mini Golf Adventures	Windows	Wanako Studios	Sierra Online	
April 18, 2007	3D Ultra Mini Golf Adventures	Xbox Live Arcade	Wanako Studios	Sierra Online	
March 9, 2007	M.A.C.H.: Modified Air Combat Heroes	PlayStation Portable	Kuju Surrey	Sierra	
May 24, 2007	3D Ultra Mini Golf Adventures: Carnival	Windows	Wanako Studios	Sierra Online	
May 24, 2007	3D Ultra Mini Golf Adventures: Lost Island	Windows	Wanako Studios	Sierra Online	
May 24, 2007	3D Ultra Mini Golf Adventures: Space	Windows	Wanako Studios	Sierra Online	
May 24, 2007	3D Ultra Mini Golf Adventures: Wild West	Windows	Wanako Studios	Sierra Online	
June 12, 2007	Scarface: The World Is Yours	Wii	Radical Entertainment	Sierra	
June 26, 2007	Switchball	Windows	Atomic Elbow	Sierra Online	
June 27, 2007	Carcassonne	Xbox Live Arcade	Sierra Online Seattle, Sierra Online Shanghai	Sierra Online	
September 18, 2007	World in Conflict	Windows	Massive Entertainment	Sierra	
October 2, 2007	Crash of the Titans	Game Boy Advance	Amaze Entertainment	Sierra	
October 2, 2007	Crash of the Titans	Nintendo DS	Amaze Entertainment	Sierra	
October 2, 2007	Crash of the Titans	PlayStation 2	Radical Entertainment	Sierra	
October 2, 2007	Crash of the Titans	Wii	Radical Entertainment	Sierra	
October 2, 2007	Crash of the Titans	Xbox 360	Radical Entertainment	Sierra	
October 2, 2007	The Legend of Spyro: The Eternal Night	Nintendo DS	Amaze Entertainment	Sierra	
October 2, 2007	The Legend of Spyro: The Eternal Night	PlayStation 2	Krome Studios, Big Ant Studios	Sierra	
October 2, 2007	The Legend of Spyro: The Eternal Night	Wii	Krome Studios, Big Ant Studios	Sierra	
October 3, 2007	The Legend of Spyro: The Eternal Night	Game Boy Advance	Amaze Entertainment	Sierra	
October 16, 2007	Crash of the Titans	PlayStation Portable	SuperVillain Studios	Sierra	
October 16, 2007	SWAT: Target Liberty	PlayStation Portable	3G Studios	Sierra	
October 23, 2007	Assault Heroes	Windows	Wanako Studios	Sierra Online	
October 23, 2007	Battlestar Galactica	Windows	Auran Games	Sierra Online	
October 24, 2007	Battlestar Galactica	Xbox Live Arcade	Auran Games	Sierra Online	
October 30, 2007	TimeShift	Windows	Saber Interactive	Sierra	
October 30, 2007	TimeShift	PlayStation 3	Saber Interactive	Sierra	
October 30, 2007	TimeShift	Xbox 360	Saber Interactive	Sierra	
November 6, 2007	Empire Earth III	Windows	Mad Doc Software	Sierra	
November 6, 2007	F.E.A.R.: Files	Xbox 360	Day:1:Studios	Sierra	
November 6, 2007	F.E.A.R.: Perseus Mandate	Windows	TimeGate Studios, Monolith Productions	Sierra	
November 7, 2007	Switchball	Xbox Live Arcade	Atomic Elbow	Sierra Online	
November 13, 2007	Aliens vs Predator: Requiem	PlayStation Portable	Rebellion Developments	Sierra	
November 20, 2007	Geometry Wars: Galaxies	Wii	Kuju Surrey, Bizarre Creations	Sierra	
November 27, 2007	Geometry Wars: Galaxies	Nintendo DS	Kuju Surrey, Bizarre Creations	Sierra	
December 12, 2007	Arkadian Warriors	Xbox Live Arcade	Wanako Studios, Sierra Online Seattle	Sierra Online	
January 16, 2008	Boogie Bunnies	Xbox Live Arcade	Artech Studios	Sierra Online	
February 5, 2008	The Spiderwick Chronicles	Nintendo DS	Backbone Entertainment	Sierra	
February 5, 2008	The Spiderwick Chronicles	Windows	Stormfront Studios	Sierra	
February 5, 2008	The Spiderwick Chronicles	PlayStation 2	Stormfront Studios	Sierra	
February 5, 2008	The Spiderwick Chronicles	Wii	Stormfront Studios	Sierra	
February 5, 2008	The Spiderwick Chronicles	Xbox 360	Stormfront Studios	Sierra	
February 13, 2008	Commanders: Attack of the Genos	Xbox Live Arcade	SouthEnd Interactive	Sierra Online	
April 23, 2008	Lost Cities	Xbox Live Arcade	Sierra Online Shanghai	Sierra Online	
May 12, 2008	Boogie Bunnies	Windows	Artech Studios	Sierra Online	
May 14, 2008	Assault Heroes 2	Xbox Live Arcade	Wanako Studios	Sierra Online	
May 2008	Commanders: Attack of the Genos	Windows	SouthEnd Interactive	Sierra Online	
June 3, 2008	Robert Ludlum's The Bourne Conspiracy	PlayStation 3	High Moon Studios	Sierra	
June 3, 2008	Robert Ludlum's The Bourne Conspiracy	Xbox 360	High Moon Studios	Sierra	
June 4, 2008	Aces of the Galaxy	Windows	Artech Digital Entertainment	Sierra Online	
June 4, 2008	Aces of the Galaxy	Xbox Live Arcade	Artech Digital Entertainment	Sierra Online	
June 18, 2008	Sea Life Safari	Xbox Live Arcade	Wanako Studios	Sierra Online	
July 22, 2008	The Mummy: Tomb of the Dragon Emperor	Nintendo DS	Artificial Mind & Movement	Sierra	
July 22, 2008	The Mummy: Tomb of the Dragon Emperor	Wii	Eurocom	Sierra	
July 2008	The Mummy: Tomb of the Dragon Emperor	PlayStation 2	Eurocom	Sierra	

=== Post-Activision merger titles ===
==== Retained by Activision ====
Title	Platform(s)	Release date	Developer(s)	Label	Ref.
Gin Rummy	Xbox Live Arcade	September 3, 2008	Sierra Online Shanghai	Sierra Online	
Crash: Mind over Mutant	PlayStation 2	October 7, 2008	Radical Entertainment	Activision (NA); Sierra (PAL)	
Crash: Mind over Mutant	PlayStation Portable	October 7, 2008	Virtuos	Activision (NA); Sierra (PAL)	
Crash: Mind over Mutant	Wii	October 7, 2008	Radical Entertainment	Activision (NA); Sierra (PAL)	
Crash: Mind over Mutant	Xbox 360	October 7, 2008	Radical Entertainment	Activision (NA); Sierra (PAL)	
The Legend of Spyro: Dawn of the Dragon	Nintendo DS	October 21, 2008	Étranges Libellules	Activision (NA); Sierra (PAL)	
The Legend of Spyro: Dawn of the Dragon	PlayStation 2	October 21, 2008	Étranges Libellules	Activision (NA); Sierra (PAL)	
The Legend of Spyro: Dawn of the Dragon	PlayStation 3	October 21, 2008	Étranges Libellules	Activision (NA); Sierra (PAL)	
The Legend of Spyro: Dawn of the Dragon	Wii	October 21, 2008	Étranges Libellules	Activision (NA); Sierra (PAL)	
The Legend of Spyro: Dawn of the Dragon	Xbox 360	October 21, 2008	Étranges Libellules	Activision (NA); Sierra (PAL)	
Red Baron: Arcade	PlayStation 3	March 12, 2009	Stainless Games	Sierra Online	
Zombie Wranglers	Xbox Live Arcade	May 6, 2009	Frozen Codebase	Sierra Online	
Prototype	Windows	June 9, 2009	Radical Entertainment	Activision	
Prototype	PlayStation 3	June 9, 2009	Radical Entertainment	Activision	
Prototype	Xbox 360	June 9, 2009	Radical Entertainment	Activision	
Ice Age: Dawn of the Dinosaurs	Windows	June 30, 2009	Eurocom	Activision	
Ice Age: Dawn of the Dinosaurs	Nintendo DS	June 30, 2009	Eurocom	Activision	
Ice Age: Dawn of the Dinosaurs	PlayStation 2	June 30, 2009	Eurocom	Activision	
Ice Age: Dawn of the Dinosaurs	PlayStation 3	June 30, 2009	Eurocom	Activision	
Ice Age: Dawn of the Dinosaurs	Wii	June 30, 2009	Eurocom	Activision	
Ice Age: Dawn of the Dinosaurs	Xbox 360	June 30, 2009	Eurocom	Activision	

=== As an indie publishing label of Activision ===
Title	Platform(s)	Release date	Developer(s)	Division	Ref.
Geometry Wars 3: Dimensions	Windows	November 25, 2014	Lucid Games	Sierra	
Geometry Wars 3: Dimensions	PlayStation 3	November 25, 2014	Lucid Games	Sierra	
Geometry Wars 3: Dimensions	PlayStation 4	November 25, 2014	Lucid Games	Sierra	
Geometry Wars 3: Dimensions	Xbox 360	November 26, 2014	Lucid Games	Sierra	
Geometry Wars 3: Dimensions	Xbox One	November 26, 2014	Lucid Games	Sierra	
Shiftlings	Windows	March 3, 2015	Rock Pocket Games	Sierra	
Shiftlings	PlayStation 4	March 3, 2015	Rock Pocket Games	Sierra	
Shiftlings	Xbox One	March 4, 2015	Rock Pocket Games	Sierra	
Geometry Wars 3: Dimensions Evolved	iOS	May 28, 2015	Lucid Games	Sierra	
Geometry Wars 3: Dimensions Evolved	Android	June 24, 2015	Lucid Games	Sierra	
Shiftlings	Wii U	June 25, 2015	Rock Pocket Games	Sierra	
Geometry Wars 3: Dimensions Evolved	PlayStation Vita	July 7, 2015	Lucid Games	Sierra	
King's Quest: Chapter I - A Knight to Remember	Windows	July 28, 2015	The Odd Gentlemen	Sierra	
King's Quest: Chapter I - A Knight to Remember	PlayStation 3	July 28, 2015	The Odd Gentlemen	Sierra	
King's Quest: Chapter I - A Knight to Remember	PlayStation 4	July 28, 2015	The Odd Gentlemen	Sierra	
King's Quest: Chapter I - A Knight to Remember	Xbox 360	July 29, 2015	The Odd Gentlemen	Sierra	
King's Quest: Chapter I - A Knight to Remember	Xbox One	July 29, 2015	The Odd Gentlemen	Sierra	
Velocity 2X	Windows	August 19, 2015	AY Software	Sierra	
Velocity 2X	Xbox One	August 19, 2015	Futurlab	Sierra	
King's Quest: Chapter II - Rubble Without a Cause	Windows	December 15, 2015	The Odd Gentlemen	Sierra	
King's Quest: Chapter II - Rubble Without a Cause	PlayStation 3	December 15, 2015	The Odd Gentlemen	Sierra	
King's Quest: Chapter II - Rubble Without a Cause	PlayStation 4	December 15, 2015	The Odd Gentlemen	Sierra	
King's Quest: Chapter II - Rubble Without a Cause	Xbox 360	December 15, 2015	The Odd Gentlemen	Sierra	
King's Quest: Chapter II - Rubble Without a Cause	Xbox One	December 15, 2015	The Odd Gentlemen	Sierra	
King's Quest: Chapter III - Once Upon a Climb	Windows	April 26, 2016	The Odd Gentlemen	Sierra	
King's Quest: Chapter III - Once Upon a Climb	PlayStation 3	April 26, 2016	The Odd Gentlemen	Sierra	
King's Quest: Chapter III - Once Upon a Climb	PlayStation 4	April 26, 2016	The Odd Gentlemen	Sierra	
King's Quest: Chapter III - Once Upon a Climb	Xbox 360	April 26, 2016	The Odd Gentlemen	Sierra	
King's Quest: Chapter III - Once Upon a Climb	Xbox One	April 26, 2016	The Odd Gentlemen	Sierra	
King's Quest: Chapter IV - Snow Place Like Home	Windows	September 27, 2016	The Odd Gentlemen	Sierra	
King's Quest: Chapter IV - Snow Place Like Home	PlayStation 3	September 27, 2016	The Odd Gentlemen	Sierra	
King's Quest: Chapter IV - Snow Place Like Home	PlayStation 4	September 27, 2016	The Odd Gentlemen	Sierra	
King's Quest: Chapter IV - Snow Place Like Home	Xbox 360	September 27, 2016	The Odd Gentlemen	Sierra	
King's Quest: Chapter IV - Snow Place Like Home	Xbox One	September 27, 2016	The Odd Gentlemen	Sierra	
King's Quest: Chapter V - The Good Knight	Windows	October 25, 2016	The Odd Gentlemen	Sierra	
King's Quest: Chapter V - The Good Knight	PlayStation 3	October 25, 2016	The Odd Gentlemen	Sierra	
King's Quest: Chapter V - The Good Knight	PlayStation 4	October 25, 2016	The Odd Gentlemen	Sierra	
King's Quest: Chapter V - The Good Knight	Xbox 360	October 25, 2016	The Odd Gentlemen	Sierra	
King's Quest: Chapter V - The Good Knight	Xbox One	October 25, 2016	The Odd Gentlemen	Sierra	
King's Quest: Epilogue	PlayStation 3	December 20, 2016	The Odd Gentlemen	Sierra	
King's Quest: Epilogue	PlayStation 4	December 20, 2016	The Odd Gentlemen	Sierra	
King's Quest: Epilogue	Xbox 360	December 20, 2016	The Odd Gentlemen	Sierra	
King's Quest: Epilogue	Xbox One	December 20, 2016	The Odd Gentlemen	Sierra	

== Unreleased games ==
- Leisure Suit Larry 4 (unwritten; number skipped as a gag)
- Leisure Suit Larry 8: Lust in Space
- Space Quest VII: Return to Roman Numerals
- King's Quest IX (untitled)
- Untitled King Videogame

== Non-game software ==
- Homeword
- The Laffer Utilities
- Sierra Print Artist
