= Field & Stream (disambiguation) =

Field & Stream is an American monthly sports magazine.

Field & Stream may also refer to:

- Field & Stream (retailer), an American retailer of hunting, fishing, camping and related outdoor recreation merchandise

== Video games ==
- Field & Stream: Trophy Bass 3D, see Dynamix
- Field & Stream: Trophy Bass 4 on List of Sierra Entertainment video games
- Field & Stream: Trophy Buck 'n Bass 2 on List of Sierra Entertainment video games
- Field & Stream: Trophy Hunting 4 on List of Sierra Entertainment video games
- Field & Stream: Total Outdoorsman Challenge, an Xbox 360 game

== See also ==
- Fields and Streams, album by Kill Rock Stars
- Field of Streams, a patch of sky where several stellar streams are visible and crisscross
