= Mad Bomber (disambiguation) =

George Metesky (1903–1994) was an American serial bomber who became known as "The Mad Bomber".

The Mad Bomber may also refer to:

== Other people ==
- Daryle Lamonica (1941–2022), American professional football player
- James Belcastro (1895–1945), American serial bomber for the Chicago Outfit
- Yves Trudeau (biker) (1946–2008)
- Wes Bialosuknia (1945–2013), American basketball player

== Media ==
=== Characters ===
- "The Mad Bomber", the main antagonist of The Blow Out
- "Mad Bomber", antagonist of Kaboom! (video game)
- Mad Bomber (DC Comics), a character notable for his adaptation in the Batman: The Animated Series episode "Beware the Gray Ghost"
- Lucas "Luke" Carlyle, also known as "Mad Bomber", a Spider-Man villain
- Mad Bomber, character in Stewardess School
- "mad bomber", centerpiece of the first episode of The Phone (American TV series)

=== Films ===
- The Mad Bomber (film)
- Mad Bomber in Love (1992), Australian film

=== Other ===
- "Mad Bomber", fantastical game in Cool Pool
- Mad Bomber Melville, a book by Leslie James Pickering about Sam Melville

== Other ==
- Madman theory, also known as "Mad bomber theory"
