= Yobi =

Yobi may refer to the following:

- Yobi (binary prefix), an ISO/IEC standard binary unit prefix.
- Yobi, the Five Tailed Fox
- The main character of the educational game Yobi's Basic Spelling Tricks.
