= Dr. Brain =

- Genres: Adventure, edutainment
- Developers: Sierra On-Line (first series); Knowledge Adventure (later series)
- Publishers: Sierra On-Line (first series); Knowledge Adventure (later series)
- Platforms: MS-DOS, Windows, Classic Mac OS, Amiga
- First release: Castle of Dr. Brain; 1992
- Latest release: The Adventures of Dr. Brain; 1999

Dr. Brain is a series of educational video games introduced by Sierra On-Line in 1992 for MS-DOS. The initial game in the series was also released for Classic Mac OS and Amiga. The objective of each game is to solve a series of puzzles to aid characters named Dr. Brain who changed from title to title. After Sierra was acquired by CUC International in 1996, the series was continued by their Knowledge Adventure division who turned it into a more action-oriented game.

== Games ==
=== Sierra ===
Sierra produced four titles in the series from 1992 to 1996. The first two games, Castle of Dr. Brain (1991) and The Island of Dr. Brain (1992), are hybrid puzzle adventure games created by an in-house team at Sierra. After the second game was released, Sierra acquired another company, Bright Star Technology, known for its educational games. The series was turned over to a Bright Star team, explaining the change in direction from the second game to the third. The third and fourth are The Lost Mind of Dr. Brain (1995) and The Time Warp of Dr. Brain (1996).

The first two Sierra games follow Dr. Thaddeus Egghead Brain, an elderly absentminded professor, while the last two follow Dr. Thaddeaus Puzzle Brain the Third (the brother of Egghead and uncle of Dr. Elaina Brain). Dr. Brain was 'reincarnated' as Dr. Cranium in Quest for Glory IV (both Dr. Brain and Quest for Glory series are designed by Corey Cole, though Dr. Cranium mentions once that one of his descendants would get "his very own game"). The background information for Dr. Cranium in the Shadows of Darkness Hintbook written by Lori and Corey Cole states that Dr. T. Egghead Brain is Dr. Cranium's great-great grandson.

=== Knowledge Adventure ===
Knowledge Adventure later released four games based on the original series:

- Dr. Brain Thinking Games: Puzzle Madness (1998) or Puzzleopolis - the first game turns Dr. Brain into a brain sitting in a jar, and casts the player as Dr. Brain's clone, Pro, fighting against the evil Conn. The player plays mini-games which are logic orientated to gain devices to duel Con and his flunkies with.
- Dr. Brain Thinking Games: IQ Adventure (1999) or Mind Venture - the second game is a third-person adventure where the player (Dr. Brain's test subject) has to find and use objects to restore a trans-dimensional device that has trapped him in a strange dimension filled with plant people, mole-men, and hostile robots.
- Dr. Brain: Action Reaction - the third game is played in a first-person perspective, and the player and Dr. Brain have been kidnapped by S.P.O.R.E, an evil organization bent on world domination. Using the three laws of physics, switch flipping, rocket turrets, and the "helping hand" to knock out guards, the player battles through 45 levels to capture the evil Dr. Craven.
- The Adventures of Dr. Brain - Dr. Brain travels through time and space to go on mission to defeat The Hench and his Henchmen. The Hench has dispersed Goopods and Goo Gords all throughout different time eras.

The new series is set in 2326 following a new Dr. Brain, a twenty-something genius instead of an old mad scientist (though this may be explained by identifying the young man with Pro). In the newer games, there are generally less education-oriented and more problem-solving puzzles, although most are third or first person games involving throwing switches and stunning guards (IQ Adventure and Action Reaction).

== Reception ==
According to Sierra, combined sales of the Dr. Brain series surpassed 350,000 units by the end of March 1996.
