= Elon Gasper =

American businessman

Elon James Gasper
- Born: 1952 (age 73–74)

Elon James Gasper (born 1952) is a high-tech executive in the United States.

== Biography ==
Gasper was co-founder of the 1980s era software company Bright Star Technology. Described by Ken Williams as "a genius ex-college professor specializing in linguistics," Gasper holds several patents relating to lip sync and other technology, and has been active in independent inventors' organizations and their public affairs advocacy.

After Bright Star's 1992 acquisition by Sierra Entertainment, Gasper was VP of Educational Games and the driving force behind many notable titles, including genealogy product Generations, traditional game Power Chess, and others.

Gasper is a former senior vice president at VizX Labs. As of 2014, Gasper was a vice president and director of research at Corum Group.

Gasper holds an M.S. in computer science and a B.S. in biochemistry from Michigan State University. He is a tournament chess player and occasional puzzle composer.
