= The Island of Dr. Brain =

1992 video game

- Developer: Sierra On-Line
- Publisher: Sierra On-Line
- Producer: Brett Miller
- Designer: Patrick Bridgemon
- Programmers: Todd Powers; Michael Lytton; Frank Roan
- Composer: Rob Atesalp
- Series: Dr. Brain
- Engine: Sierra's Creative Interpreter
- Platform: MS-DOS
- Release: 1992
- Genres: Educational, adventure
- Mode: Single-player

The Island of Dr. Brain is the second game in the Dr. Brain series by Sierra On-Line. It was released in 1992 and was only available for IBM PC compatibles. Like the first game in the Dr. Brain series, Castle of Dr. Brain, Island is an educational puzzle adventure game.

The game was designed by Patrick Bridgemon, and was produced and directed by Brett Miller. Todd Powers was the lead programmer. The game's music was written by Rob Atesalp.

== Gameplay ==
The game's story starts with an explanation by Dr. Brain. He tells the player that plans for his latest project were stolen, and he charges the player to retrieve a battery from his island and bring it to him. The player must then traverse the security puzzles Dr. Brain has set up throughout his island.

== Reception ==
Computer Gaming World's Charles Ardai wrote that, given Castle of Dr. Brain's quality, "one wonders how Sierra could have gotten everything so wrong the second time around", comparing The Island of Dr. Brain to a computer tutorial for the SAT test. He stated that "the puzzles are more contrived and less fun" and that while the game emphasized education more than its predecessor did—assuming knowledge of subjects like the periodic table, music, and literature—and its marketing claimed "We guarantee this game will entertain your child while he or she learns", The Island of Dr. Brain contained "several embarrassing, sloppy mistakes" like misspelling Jules Verne's name.

== Reviews ==
- Games #115
