= Encore, Inc. =

American software company

Encore Software, LLC
- Type: Private
- Industry: Software Development and Distribution
- Predecessor: WD, Encore Software, LLC.
- Founded: 1994; 32 years ago
- Headquarters: San Jose, California, U.S.
- Products: Video games
- Owner: Sereno Ventures, LLC
- Divisions: Broderbund
- Website: www.encore.com

Encore Software, LLC is a Delaware limited liability company focused on software sales, distribution and software development.

In November 2008, Encore announced an expanded license with Riverdeep. Under the terms of the agreement, Encore now manages the Broderbund family of products as well as Broderbund's direct to consumer business. In May 2010, Encore acquired the assets of Punch! Software.

Previously, Encore was a wholly owned subsidiary of WYNIT Distribution, LLC which acquired the majority of Encore's assets from Speed Commerce, Inc. (previously Navarre Corporation) on approximately July 9, 2014. Navarre Corporation, had initially acquired Encore's assets from the United States Bankruptcy Court for the Central District of California in August 2002.

As a result of bankruptcy case 17-42726 of WYNIT Distribution, LLC, substantially all of Encore's assets were sold at auction on November 9, 2017, to Sereno Ventures, LLC, a Delaware limited liability company, with offices in San Francisco Bay Area, California.

Shortly after the sale, Encore's main office in Eden Prairie, Minnesota was closed. Encore continues to operate a sales call center in Cedar Rapids, Iowa, while technical support and software development is managed by senior management in the US with the help of offshore staff in Lahore, Pakistan.

== Titles ==
Among the brands published by Encore for the retail market:

- Echelon: Wind Warriors
- Punch! Home Design Software
- Houghton Mifflin Harcourt's Broderbund and The Learning Company: distributes primarily through the Broderbund website owned by Encore. Series include Adventure Workshop, Carmen Sandiego, ClickArt, Disney Fun & Skills, Mavis Beacon, The Oregon Trail, The Print Shop, PrintMaster, and Reader Rabbit.
- Hoyle Card Games, Hoyle Casino and Hoyle Puzzle & Board Games
- Jeopardy! and Wheel of Fortune PC/Mac games
- PlayFirst titles, including the Diner Dash series.
- Runic Games' Torchlight: distributed to the North American retail market by Encore
- Panda Security software
- WildTangent games, including Fate: The Traitor Soul
