= The Time Warp of Dr. Brain =

1996 video game

- Developer(s): Sierra On-Line
- Publisher(s): Sierra On-Line
- Producer(s): Sherry Wrana
- Designer(s): Mark Krause; Ward Makielski
- Programmer(s): Mark Marion
- Artist(s): Travis Brady
- Writer(s): Rodney Sherwood; Dee Dickinson
- Composer(s): Jonathan Cunningham
- Series: Dr. Brain
- Platform(s): Macintosh, Windows, Windows 3.x
- Release: NA: November, 1996
- Genre(s): Educational, puzzle
- Mode(s): Single-player

The Time Warp of Dr. Brain is the fourth installment of the educational game series Dr. Brain by Sierra On-Line. The game's structure is similar to its predecessor, The Lost Mind of Dr. Brain: the player must complete several puzzles which appeal to a specific part of the brain; however, this game also adds a time-period based theme to each puzzle and the game's theme overall is time travel.

== Gameplay ==
Like the previous titles, The Time Warp of Dr. Brain is a simple point-and-click. The objective of the game is to successfully complete a set of 10 puzzles. Throughout the game, Dr. Brain poses as an advisor to the player, constantly passing witty comments and suggestions. There are three difficulty levels: novice, expert, and genius, with each level containing its own set of predetermined puzzles. Each level has a set of 20 sub-games. Each game can be completed at the player's choosing, and the difficulty levels can be alternated between at any time; completion of each puzzle is based on the score accrued. A total of approximately 12000 points is needed to finish one of the games, with a win in novice, expert, and genius levels granting 250, 1000, and 2250 points, respectively.

At the start of the game is a mini-game similar to the video-game Space Invaders. This serves as the main menu of the game. The player must shoot the appropriate spaceship to choose options.

== Reception ==
Reception

Review score
Publication	Score
The Electric Playground	8/10
