= Dr. Brain: Action Reaction =

1999 video game

- Cover art
- Developer(s): Knowledge Adventure
- Publisher(s): Knowledge Adventure
- Engine: Unreal Engine 1
- Platform(s): Windows
- Release: August 19, 1999
- Genre(s): Educational, puzzle
- Mode(s): Single-player

Dr. Brain: Action Reaction is the third installment of the Dr. Brain series by Knowledge Adventure, based on the series by Sierra Entertainment.

In this game, the player is captured along with Dr. Brain by S.P.O.R.E., Sinister People Organized Really Efficiently, and taken to a secret underwater base from which the object of the game is to escape. Using the three laws of physics, switch flipping, rocket turrets, and the "helping hand" to knock out guards, the player and Dr. Brain must find a way to foil S.P.O.R.E.'s plan of world domination and capture the evil Dr. Craven.

The game is composed of 45 different levels of varying difficulty. The player must use quick footwork and lightning fast mental skills to avoid obstacles along the way. The music for this game was written and produced by Giorgio Bertuccelli and Michael Skloff. For the most part, it is a collage of soft rock, techno, and pop as befits an action game.
