= Echelon: Wind Warriors =

2004 video game

- Developer(s): Encore Software
- Publisher(s): Buka Entertainment
- Designer(s): Peter Porai-Koshots
- Platform(s): Windows
- Release: 2004

Echelon: Wind Warriors is a 2004 video game from Buka Entertainment. The game is a sequel to Echelon.

== Gameplay ==
Echelon: Wind Warriors is a hybrid of space and flight simulation, with players in the cockpits of futuristic fighters to engage in aerial dogfights and ground assaults across planetary landscapes. The game features 40 missions—both campaign and standalone—that emphasize fast-paced combat over narrative depth. Players pilot a range of ships, each with distinct speed, maneuverability, and weapon configurations, from nimble scouts to heavily armed flying tanks. Weapons include energy guns, cannons, rockets, and guided missiles. Controls are available via mouse or joystick. Flight physics are simplified, and terrain and mission types vary. Multiplayer supports up to 48 players.

== Development ==
The game was announced in August 2001.

== Reception ==
Echelon: Wind Warriors

Aggregate score
Aggregator	Score
Metacritic	63/100

Review scores
Publication	Score
GameSpot	5.3/10
GameStar	67%
GameZone	6.5/10
Jeuxvideo.com	12/20
PC Gamer (US)	79%

Echelon received "mixed or average" reviews from critics, according to the review aggregation website Metacritic. GameSpot said "Echelon: Wind Warriors isn't a bad game, so much as a mediocre and totally unambitious one".
