= Hoyle Casino Empire =

2002 video game

- Developer: Sierra Entertainment
- Publisher: Sierra Entertainment
- Composer: Mike Caviezel
- Series: Hoyle Casino
- Platform: Windows
- Release: NA: September 23, 2002; EU: October 25, 2002
- Genre: Business simulation game
- Mode: Single-player

Hoyle Casino Empire (Casino Empire in Europe) is a business simulation game on Windows computers, in which the player must run a casino and try to make profit, attract customers and get good ratings. It was developed by an in-house internal development team at Sierra Entertainment and was published by the company as well. It is part of Sierra's Hoyle Casino series.

== Gameplay ==
The goal of Hoyle Casino Empire is to create a thriving casino. There are two modes in the game; Empire Mode and Sandbox Mode. Empire Mode is basically the game's campaign mode, and has the player manage eight different casinos, starting with a small one and working up to the biggest casino. In each casino, the player will be presented a set of objectives to meet in a given time in order to proceed to the next casino. Should the player miss any of these objectives in a casino, the game has to be restarted from the last casino reached. Sandbox Mode allows the player to build and design the casino as desired with no constraints of time limit or objectives. This mode cannot be played until the player completes the first casino in the Empire Mode, the progress of which also unlocks more casinos for this mode.

The player starts in a specific kind of building with a limited amount of money to spend and large areas of space to build. The casino also has a Level Status, which determines what kind of casino games and services can be added or built. Once the casino meets the minimum number requirements of visiting customers and good ratings, the player can spend a certain amount of money to increase the casino's Level Status, up to the Fourth Level. The number of customers can be increased by introducing more games and services, while the casino ratings can be increased by introducing variety, room decor, building extensions, cash donations, deluxe services and satisfying customers' general requirements.

General requirements for customers include cash desks (and ATMs) to withdraw money for gambling, restrooms, eateries and bars, hotel accommodations and other establishments. Missing these general requirements may cause customers to leave the casino and give bad reviews. Cash donations can only keep dissatisfied customers happy temporarily. Customers come in different types, ranging from Tourists who carry little cash to VIPs who carry a lot. When building games and services in the casino, maintenance is needed to keep the casino running. Machine attendants maintain slot machines and other electronics, custodians keep the casino and restrooms clean, waitresses serve drinks to customers, and security guards look out for disturbances and intruders, the latter including attackers from rival casinos.

Earning money legally is done by providing sufficient services to the number of customers and accepting commercial stunt deals with agreements met. However, money can be earned illegitimately by increasing the House Edge to Cheating Mode, in addition to accepting crooked deals such as money laundering. Such activities can lead to financial and rating losses if found out by city authorities. While attempting to earn profit, the player must keep in mind the maintenance and employee wage expenses that present in the gameplay. Should the money go below zero, the player is considered in debt and cannot spend on anything until the money goes back up.

== Reception ==
Reception

Review scores
Publication	Score
GameSpot	5.9/10
GameSpy	3.5/5
GameZone	8.4/10
IGN	6.2/10

Hoyle Casino Empire received a number of mixed reviews.

== See also ==
- Casino Tycoon
