= Sammy Lightfoot =

1983 video game

- Developer: Sierra On-Line
- Publishers: Sierra On-Line; Comptiq (PC-88)
- Designer: Warren Schwader
- Platforms: Apple II, Commodore 64, ColecoVision, PC-88
- Release: 1983: Apple, C64; 1984: ColecoVision; 1985: PC-88
- Genre: Platform

Sammy Lightfoot is a video game written by Warren Schwader for the Apple II and published by Sierra On-Line in 1983. It is a platform game (or "climbing game", as the genre was called in the US in 1983) in the vein of Donkey Kong. Sammy Lightfoot follows the travails of a circus worker who jumps and climbs through perilous situations in three non-scrolling levels. It was ported to the Commodore 64 followed by ColecoVision and the PC-8800 series.

== Reception ==
The Commodore 64 Home Companion stated that Sammy Lightfoot captures the cartoon spirit and graphic style of Donkey Kong without being a simple clone.

== Legacy ==
Warren Schwader worked on a sequel called Sammy's Icehouse which was never finished. He described it as similar to Mario Bros.

== See also ==
- Apple Cider Spider, another Apple II platform game released by Sierra On-Line in 1983.
- Threshold, 1981 game developed by Warren Schwader
