= Boogie Bunnies =

2008 video game

- Developer: Artech Studios
- Publisher: Vivendi Games (Note: Released under the Sierra Online brand name)
- Platforms: Xbox 360, Windows
- Release: Xbox 360; January 16, 2008; Windows; May 13, 2008
- Genre: Puzzle game
- Modes: Single player, Multiplayer

Boogie Bunnies is a match-3 puzzle game developed by Artech Studios for the Xbox 360's Xbox Live Arcade service and Windows. The game features same machine and Xbox Live co-op multiplayer.

Boogie Bunnies gameplay screenshot

== Reception ==
Reception

Aggregate score
Aggregator	Score
Metacritic	54/100

Review scores
Publication	Score
1Up.com	C+
Eurogamer	6/10
GamePro	2.25/5
GameSpot	6.5/10
GamesTM	6/10
IGN	4.1/10
Official Xbox Magazine (UK)	4/10
Official Xbox Magazine (US)	4.5/10
TeamXbox	7.5/10
411Mania	8.6/10

The Xbox 360 version received "mixed" reviews according to the review aggregation website Metacritic.

TeamXbox said, "Despite a few bungled dance steps here and there, Boogie Bunnies is still a strangely addictive experience." IGN criticized the game, saying, "It does nothing different from the gaggle of puzzlers that are already out there and the old playstyles that it employs aren't nearly as fun as we'd hoped."

The Xbox 360 version was nominated for one Xbox Live Arcade 2008 award, "Best Family Game", which went to A Kingdom for Keflings.

== See also ==
- AstroPop
- Puzzle Bobble
