= Front Page Sports: Ski Racing =

1997 video game

- Developer: Dynamix
- Publisher: Sierra On-Line
- Platform: Windows
- Release: October 1997

Front Page Sports: Ski Racing is a 1997 video game from Dynamix. The game was later repackaged by publisher Sierra Sports as simply Ski Racing. It was followed by Skiing, 1999 Edition.

== Gameplay ==
The player is treated to videos of Picabo Street explaining the best and easiest way to make it down the hill alive.

The player is given choices of five different kinds of racing: Slalom, Giant Slalom, Super-G, Downhill and All-Around. In these the player can control the difficulty of the courses by changing the weather and the snow conditions. In addition there are six choices of courses to ski on: Whistler, Aspen Mountain, Vail, Mt. Bachelor, Val d’lsere and Garmisch.

== Reception ==
Reception

Review scores
Publication	Score
Computer Games Magazine	2/5
Computer Gaming World	2/5
GameSpot	8/10
Gamezilla	75%
GameStar	28%
PC Joker	33%
PC Player	62%

Computer Gaming World gave the game a score of 2 out of 5 stating "Maybe if Papyrus had developed the game instead of Dynamix it would have been more realistic. As it is, it's a moderately fun arcade racing game. Just don't try the slalom."
