= Leslie James Pickering =

American activist

- Born: Buffalo, New York, US
- Occupations: Activist, writer
- Employer: Burning Books
- Known for: Spokesman for the Earth Liberation Front from 1997 to 2002
- Website: LeslieJamesPickering.com

Leslie James Pickering is an American activist and former spokesperson for the Earth Liberation Front Press Office advocating for political and social justice, human rights, and environmental protection.

== Career ==
Inspired by an animal rights leaflet at a music concert Pickering began to study radical and revolutionary movements of the past. His studies led to his eventual involvement in an organization known as the Liberation Collective in Portland, Oregon. When the organization received a communique from a closely aligned group, the Earth Liberation Front, co-founder Craig Rosebraugh and Pickering decided to establish the North American Earth Liberation Front Press Office in 1999. He currently is a professor at Niagara University, specializing in social and environmental rights.

The ELF was classified as the top "domestic terror" threat in the United States by the Federal Bureau of Investigation in March 2001, As the Earth Liberation front garnered more mainstream media attention Pickering continued to articulate the ideology of the Earth Liberation front for television and print media including interviews for 60 Minutes, National Geographic: Inside Basecamp and The New York Times. Pickering continued to speak to the press about the Earth Liberation Front even though he and Rosebraugh both resigned from the NAELFPO in 2002.

After resigning from the Earth Liberation Front Press Office Pickering began writing books on radical figures and revolutionary movements and participated in speaking engagements in addition to his ongoing activism and environmental advocacy. In 2011 Pickering was featured in the ELF based documentary If a Tree Falls: A Story of the Earth Liberation Front and opened a bookstore specializing in radical history, literature, films, and lectures in Buffalo, New York.

=== Political views ===
Pickering has said:

"I don't think that slow progress is going to do it, though. This isn't a quality-of-life issue that we're dealing with, the environment. It's not something that we can pretend will be solved with our nonprofit, tax-deductible donations. This is a global catastrophe, and if we don't act accordingly, the planet's going to be dead. It's not going to matter how uncomfortable we are with arson, or sabotage, or property destruction, or violent revolution, when the planet is dead. It's not going to matter."

=== Books ===
- The Earth Liberation Front: 1997–2002 2007; Portland, Oregon: Arissa Media Group. ISBN 978-0-9742884-0-6
- Mad Bomber Melville (paperback). 2007; Portland, Oregon: Arissa Media Group. ISBN 978-0-9742884-4-4
- Conspiracy to Riot in Furtherance of Terrorism: The Collective Autobiography of the RNC 8 (editor). 2011; Portland, Oregon: Arissa Media Group. ISBN 978-1-936900-18-3

== Personal life ==
Pickering lives in Buffalo, New York with his wife Theresa Baker and their daughter. He has been under FBI surveillance and has his mail monitored. He grew up in East Aurora and West Seneca, New York.
