= Crossfire (1981 video game) =

1981 video game

- IBM PC box art
- Publishers: On-Line Systems; IBM
- Designer: Jay Sullivan
- Programmers: Apple II; Jay Sullivan; Atari 8-bit Chris Iden
- Platforms: Apple II, Atari 8-bit, Commodore 64, IBM PC, IBM PCjr, VIC-20
- Release: 1981: Apple, Atari, VIC; 1982: IBM PC; 1983: C64; 1984: PCjr
- Genre: Multidirectional shooter
- Mode: Single-player

Crossfire is a multidirectional shooter created by Jay Sullivan for the Apple II and published by On-Line Systems in 1981. Using keyboard-based twin-stick shooter controls, the player maneuvers a ship in a grid-like maze. Versions with joystick-control use the stick for movement and switch to firing mode when the button is held down.

Crossfire was ported to Atari 8-bit computers, VIC-20, Commodore 64, and IBM PC (as a self-booting disk). A cartridge version was a 1984 launch title for the IBM PCjr, announced in late 1983.

== Gameplay ==
The player uses the IJKL keys to move or the joystick (the Atari and Commodore versions are joystick only) and ESDF to shoot left, right, up, and down through the pathways on an evenly-spaced grid of blocks, avoiding incoming fire and dispatching enemies. The player can move and fire in four directions, but can only stop in intersections. The player advances a level when all enemies are destroyed.

Along the left, right, and top sides of the playfield are 16 pockets which release enemies. These enemies emerge and move among the blocks, firing at and attempting to collide with the player. The four types of enemies differ only in appearance, not in power or behavior, and are worth 10, 20, 40, and 80 points respectively. Enemies move and fire in four directions, but are slower than the player and never run out of ammunition.

Within four blocks near the middle of the playfield are orange, spindle-shaped bonus items. Once the player has fired 12 times (after the beginning of the level or after collecting the previous bonus), the item emerges from its block. If it has not been collected after 6 shots, it returns to its block, and no further bonus items will appear in that level. Capturing the bonus items grants 100, 200, 400, and 800 points.

The player can fire a limited number of shots before having to reload. This starts at 35 and decreases by 5 each level until 15. When 10 shots remain, a cluster of four pulsing white dots appears which reloads the player's ammunition. Only one shot can be in the air at a time.

Play begins with three ships, and an extra ship is awarded every 5,000 points.

== Ports ==
The Atari 8-bit version has separate cartridge and floppy disk releases. The cartridge version runs on a machine with at least 16K, and uses character mode graphics; while the floppy version needs 32K, runs in a bitmap mode, and duplicates the Apple II graphics. The Commodore 64 release has background music which is absent from other versions.

== Reception ==
Softline called Crossfire "a new twist on arcade games with delightfully colorful beasties and smooth animation", which "offers hours of challenge and enjoyment for the dedicated and persevering gamester". BYTE called Crossfire "one of the most difficult and challenging arcade games to play ... The reflexes take a long time to master, but, once you get the hang of it, it's addictive". PC Magazine's review was less favorable, calling the alien-attack scenario overused. It described the IBM PC version's graphics as "adequate, but nothing spectacular", and the controls as imprecise and inelegant.

In March 1983, the Atari 8-bit computer version of Crossfire received a Certificate of Merit in the category of "Best Arcade/Action Computer Games" at the 4th annual Arkie Awards, but reviews for other versions were mixed. Ahoy!'s review was critical, stating "do we really need a bare bones grid shooting game (the VIC graphics are absolutely starved), with no character or atmosphere?" InfoWorld was more positive regarding the IBM PCjr version, describing it as "an engrossing waste of time". The Addison-Wesley Book of Atari Software 1984 gave the game an overall B+ rating, calling it "one of the best strategy shoot-'em-ups" of the 1980s.
