= Sierra Sports: Skiing 1999 Edition =

1998 video game

- Developer: Sierra On-Line
- Publisher: Sierra Sports
- Platform: Windows
- Release: NA: November 10, 1998
- Genre: Sports
- Modes: Single player, multiplayer

Sierra Sports: Skiing 1999 Edition (also known as Skiing with Picabo Street, 1999 Edition, and, in Europe, Ski Racing: Extreme Edition) is a sports game developed and published by Sierra On-Line for Microsoft Windows in 1998. It follows Front Page Sports: Ski Racing.

== Gameplay ==
Sierra Sports: Skiing 1999 Edition presents a skiing course made up of a flat white landscape, with orange boundary netting, occasional trees, and flags to break up the terrain.

== Reception ==
Reception

Aggregate score
Aggregator	Score
GameRankings	34%

Review scores
Publication	Score
CNET Gamecenter	7/10
Computer Games Strategy Plus	0.5/5
IGN	2.5/10
PC Accelerator	3/10
PC Gamer (US)	43%

The game received unfavorable reviews according to the review aggregation website GameRankings.
