= Apple Cider Spider =

1983 video game

- Developer: Sierra On-Line
- Publisher: Sierra On-Line
- Designer: Ivan Strand
- Platforms: Apple II, Commodore 64
- Release: 1983: Apple II; 1984: C64
- Genre: Platform
- Mode: Single-player

Apple Cider Spider is a platform game written for the Apple II by Ivan Strand and published by Sierra On-Line in 1983. A Commodore 64 port followed. The player takes the role of a spider in an apple cider factory. The goal is to progress through three non-scrolling screens to reach the top of the factory.

== Gameplay ==
Gameplay screenshot

The structure of the three screens follows the production cycle of apple cider in reverse order, starting from the bottling and sealing of cider and ending at the delivery of fresh whole apples. The first screen mainly concerns extracting the apple juice to be made into cider, the second screen concerns splitting the apples in two and crushing the halves, and the third screen concerns the actual import of the apples. Each screen is situated on top of the previous one, so the spider progresses upward while the apples are carried downward.

The challenge in the game comes almost completely in the form of natural obstacles in the cider factory. Contact with cider, apples, or cider-making instruments kills the spider instantly. All three screens feature a complex system of conveyor belts that the spider must travel along in the opposite direction to the cider and the apples.

When the three screens have been completed, the game starts again, but with added dangers. These include various animals that hop along the platform as well as blocker bars on the ladders that the spider uses to move upwards.

== See also ==
- Sammy Lightfoot, another 1983 Apple II platform game from Sierra On-Line
