= Stay Tooned! (video game) =

1996 video game

- CD cover art
- Developer: Funnybone Interactive
- Publisher: Sierra On-Line
- Designers: Susan Decker; Ben Howard; Kevin O'Neill; Chris Lewis
- Engine: Macromedia Director
- Platforms: Microsoft Windows; Macintosh
- Release: October 1996
- Genre: Action-adventure
- Mode: Single-player

Stay Tooned! (subtitled "Unsweetened Multi-Game Experience!") is a 1996 action-adventure video game developed by Funnybone Interactive and published by Sierra On-Line for Microsoft Windows and Macintosh. In the game, the player must navigate through an apartment complex to find a TV remote to zap rogue cartoon characters back into TV Land.

== Gameplay ==
Stay Tooned! is an action-adventure game where the player must retrieve several keys in an apartment complex to find a remote to zap rogue cartoon characters back into TV Land after they have been let out of the television and stolen the remote. The apartment complex has five floors to navigate, including the roof, the basement and several hidden rooms. Numerous tasks must be completed to retrieve the keys, such as building a Rube Goldberg machine; some of the tasks are abnormal, such as shaving Fiddle to the bone.

To retrieve the remote, the player must find an oven mitt for the oven in Apartment 5D, which houses the remote. Once the player gets the remote, the toons must be zapped into the television to beat the game.

== Plot ==
The game begins in a large apartment building in the middle of an unnamed city. The player takes the place of an ordinary patron living in an apartment. The player starts off simply channel-surfing with a TV remote and watching short cartoons and commercials that parody real-life shows; said shows include Whinefeld, a parody of Seinfeld. One channel has the game's chief programmer providing hints on how to play the upcoming game.

Several cartoon characters either forbid or encourage the player to push the red button on their remote as the player surfs the channels. When the player pushes the button, the cartoons break out of the television set, steal the remote, and cause the entire apartment complex to go into animated form. The player must retrieve the television remote, which is the only thing that can zap the escaped toons and send them back to TV Land, the fictional toon world found within the depths of the television. The player searches the other apartments for the remote while playing about thirty games contained within them and avoiding the destructive trickery committed by the escaped toons.

At the end of the game, once the remote is retrieved, the player must zap all of the toons back into the television (and that includes extras such as the Überbugs and the penguins). Once all of the toons are captured, as a plot of revenge, Pixel demands Chisel that they can not let the player get away with this. Chisel grabs the player and warps them into the television. Once they make it into TV Land, the player gets flattened, and has the disturbing realization that, in the process, the player has been turned into a toon as well.

=== Characters ===
The first five characters mentioned are the five toons that must be captured. The others serve as background characters. Most of the toons are against the player, but some will provide help.

- Pixel: Pixel is the main character of the game. She is a pink cat and the leader of the group. She wears a purple shirt. She is very mature and a perfectionist, and the only female of the group, although she is prone to irritability and temper tantrums. She is almost as destructive as Chisel and the smartest in the group. She is the subject of Schmooze's affections, feelings that she does not return.
- Chisel: Chisel is a blue cat and the second in-command of the group. He wears a red cap. He is the most destructive of the toons, as he loves throwing explosives such as dynamite at everything he can, including the player. He is Pixel's twin brother.
- Fiddle: Fiddle is a black and white cat. Fiddle is tall, skinny, and the most cowardly of the five toons. He is constantly chased by another anthropomorphic cat named Katrina, who has a huge crush on him. He is the least destructive of the toons and is the only one of the five who openly supports the player's efforts to find the remote and zap them home.
- Schmooze: Schmooze is a short, orange anthropomorphic dog that resembles a bulldog, and the most irritable of the toons. He is somewhat selfish and obnoxious, and hates the other dog in the group, Scoops. He is recognizable by his black bowler hat and red vest. He often has fantasies about being a rich sultan and is deeply in love with the group's leader, Pixel.
- Scoops: Scoops is the other dog in the group and arguably the most hyperactive and cheerful in the group. He often annoys Schmooze and has an obsessive love for gravy. He has an unusually good singing voice.
- Frank: Frank is a heavily built up human toon who hates the other toons. He can be either the player's ally or enemy. He acts very tough and loves to pick fights.
- Dr. Pickles: Dr. Pickles is a mad scientist bent on world domination. He conducts very painful experiments on the other toons and has the strange ability to open his head to his brain.
- Mrs. Findley: Mrs. Findley is a middle-aged woman who is usually grouchy and a heavy smoker. She lives in Apartment 5D on the fifth floor with her cats and lazy husband.
- Katrina: Katrina is a tall white cat who adores Fiddle. She seeks to marry him and often attacks him with kisses. She is neutral in the player's fight against the toons.
- Killtron: Killtron is the Magic Death Robot and an occasional enemy of the player. He only shows up in the vast hallways or at the Kartoon Kombat! game.
- Al Extrabux: An obvious parody of Alex Trebek on the game show Schleopardy! (itself a parody of Jeopardy!).
- Purple Glop: As the name describes, a sentient purple pile of slime that intentionally stalls the player's mission.
- Überbug: A German bug who seeks to take control of the player's fridge with his bug army.
- Mr. Fishy: A proper, somewhat irritable herring.
- Ben: The game's lead programmer; he often breaks the fourth wall and appears in hidden areas.
- The Penguins: Very temperamental extras.
- Cable Guy, Pizza Delivery Guy and Policeman: Three ordinary men who look exactly alike. The player is able to call them on the phone on the first floor. While the Pizza Delivery Guy serves as an extra, only the Cable Guy and the Policeman provide the player an advantage. The Cable Guy will fix the apartment complex's cable box once the player retrieves his missing sock from the downstairs laundry room. The Policeman can be used to gorge upon a sentient donut that blocks the players way in one of the rooms.

== Reception ==
Reception

Review score
Publication	Score
The Electric Playground	7.5/10
