= Hoyle Casino =

Casino video game series

- Cover art of the 2000 game
- Genre: Gambling
- Developers: Sierra Entertainment (1996–2003); Encore, Inc. (2005–2016)
- Publishers: Sierra Entertainment (1996–2003); Encore, Inc. (2005–2016)
- Platforms: Windows, Mac OS X, Dreamcast, Game Boy Color
- First release: Hoyle Casino; 1996
- Latest release: Hoyle Official Casino Games Collection; 2016
- Parent series: Hoyle's Official Book of Games

Hoyle Casino is a virtual casino video game series released from 1996 to 2016 as a spin-off of the Hoyle's Official Book of Games series developed and published by Sierra Entertainment. After 2005, publication of the series moved to Encore, Inc.

Set in a virtual Las Vegas casino, players create profiles and are given a set amount of virtual money. A player can then visit any part of the virtual casino and wager their virtual money as they could in a real casino. A related business simulation game called Hoyle Casino Empire was released in 2002.

== Editions ==
- Hoyle Casino (1996)
- Hoyle Casino (1997)
- Hoyle Casino (1998)
- Hoyle Casino (1999)
- Hoyle Casino (2000)
- Hoyle Casino (2001)
- Hoyle Casino (2002)
- Hoyle Casino (2003)
- Hoyle Casino (2004)
- Hoyle Casino 3D (2005)
- Hoyle Casino Games (2007)
- Hoyle Casino Games (2009)
- Hoyle Casino Games (2011); re-released as Encore Classic Casino Games (2020)
- Hoyle Casino Collection series (2012–2015)
- Hoyle Official Casino Games Collection (2016); re-released as Encore Casino Games Collection (2019)

Spin-offs:

- Hoyle Blackjack (1996)
- Hoyle Poker (1997) (a.k.a. Hoyle Classic Poker and Hoyle Friday Night Poker)
- Hoyle Craps & Blackjack (1999)
- Hoyle Slots & Video Poker (with Horse Racing) (1999)
- Hoyle Slots (2001)
- Hoyle Casino Empire (2002)
- Hoyle Texas Hold'Em (2006)
- Hoyle Slots (2009)
- Hoyle Swashbucklin' Slots (2010)

Compilations:

- Hoyle Casino Games [2010] (2010); includes Hoyle Casino Games (2009), Hoyle Slots (2009) and Hoyle Swashbucklin' Slots (2010)

== Gameplay ==
=== 2000 edition ===
The game offers instant access to the rules for each game, as well as real time tips and strategies as the player plays a game. Hoyle Casino features 25 default characters to choose from, or players can simply create their own unique custom character.

The 2000 edition was released for the Windows, Mac OS X, Dreamcast and Game Boy Color.

== Games included ==
The Blackjack table in Hoyle Casino 2012.

The 2016 edition of Hoyle Casino includes the following games:

- 3 Card Poker
- 5 Card Draw
- 5 Card Lowball
- 7 Card Stud
- 7 Card Stud Hi-Lo
- Baccarat
- Baseball Poker
- Big Six Wheel
- Bingo
- Blackjack
- Craps
- Midnight Baseball Poker
- Omaha Hold 'Em
- Omaha Hold 'Em Hi-Lo
- Pai Gow Poker
- Roulette
- Texas Hold 'Em
- Video Blackjack
- Video Keno
- Video Poker (Single-Hand)
- Video Poker (Multi-Hand)
- Video Texas Hold 'Em

== Controversy and bugs ==
The 2007 version of Hoyle Casino was plagued by a bug in the cards game. A player would place a bet, and then the game would freeze for 30 seconds before continuing. Encore was not able to fix this bug. Customers' only recourse was to visit the Encore USA website and submit a refund request for the software. This bug was fixed in Hoyle Casino 2008.

== Reception ==
In North America, Hoyle Casino 2000 sold 230,365 units and earned $6.15 million from January through October 2000, according to PC Data.
