= Mixed-Up Mother Goose =

1987 video game

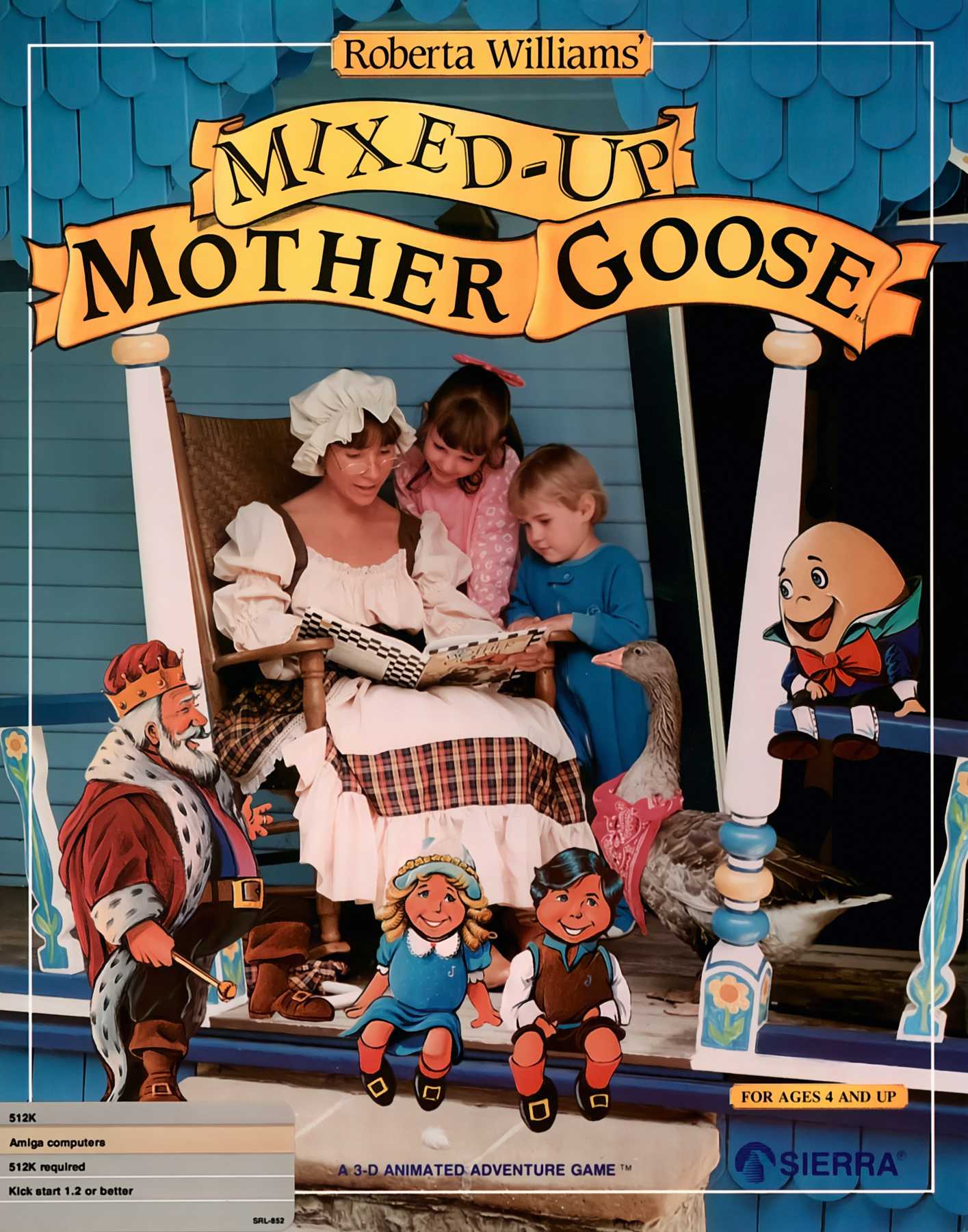
- 1987 version cover art
- Developers: Sierra On-Line; Coktel Vision
- Publisher: Sierra On-Line
- Designer: Roberta Williams
- Programmer: David Slayback
- Artist: Gerald Moore
- Composer: Amenda Lombardo
- Engine: AGI (1987); SCI (1990/91/95)
- Platforms: MS-DOS, Amiga, Apple II, Apple IIGS, Atari ST, Windows, Mac, FM Towns
- Release: November 1987
- Genres: Educational, Adventure
- Mode: Single-player

Roberta Williams' Mixed-Up Mother Goose is an educational adventure game released by Sierra On-Line in 1987. It was the first multimedia PC game released on CD-ROM in 1991. A second game in the series, Mixed-Up Fairy Tales, was released in 1991.

The storyline of the game is very simple, as is common in games for children. One night, while preparing for bed, a child (which is the player's avatar) is sent into the dreamlike world of Mother Goose, who desperately needs help. All the nursery rhymes in the land have gotten mixed up, with none of the inhabitants possessing the items necessary for their rhyme to exist. And so, the child will find themselves helping Humpty Dumpty find a ladder to scramble onto a wall, bringing the little lamb back to Mary and seeking out a pail for Jack and Jill, among others.

== Gameplay ==
A little lamb goes back to Mary (Atari ST)

The player controls his or her characters using - almost exclusively - the four direction keys on the keyboard. When an item of interest comes into view, it is usually shown very clearly, so that younger gamers would not find it difficult to hunt it down. Walking close to an item is synonymous with picking it up and, as there is only one inventory window in the top-right corner of the screen, the character can only hold one object at a time. Inanimate objects can be found in houses or on the ground throughout the land, whereas living objects can only be found outdoors. In the case of living objects, the person or animal will follow behind the player so that they can be led back to the person or place they need to be to complete the rhyme. Human objects, such as Peter Peter Pumpkin Eater's wife, will also explain where they want to go in words and a "thought bubble". Some characters (namely Old King Cole) require several items brought to them in order to put their rhyme back together. All but one of the items are placed randomly throughout the land. There are 18 nursery rhymes to choose from, 20 items to recover, and many screens in which one can find the lost items. A point is awarded for each fixed rhyme. If a player finds it hard to match the objects with the rhymes, he or she can approach the characters who are in need of a specific part of their story and this item will be displayed above them in the form of a "thought bubble". At the beginning of the game, the player can select the character that will be used during the game, with 8 characters from which to choose. The game can be saved, or more precisely, bookmarked (a feature which became prominent - and somewhat infamous - in some later Sierra games, including Phantasmagoria and King's Quest VII), at any time.

== Ports ==
Mixed-Up Mother Goose was remade by Sierra three times:

- In 1990 (Mixed-Up Mother Goose Enhanced), it was remade using the SCI0 system, which meant improved graphics.
- In 1991 (Mixed-Up Mother Goose VGA/Multimedia CD), the game was remade, this time with more significant enhancements and changes. The first was the clearly visible change in graphics, resulting from Sierra's transition to VGA games. Second, the rhymes were given voices, each of them being sung separately, with the appropriate actions accompanying the music. Third, the interface was updated and became easier and faster to navigate. Finally, the player was given a map of the land, if they should ever feel lost in the nursery rhyme world. This edition came out as a CD version with full digital speech, and as a floppy version in which only the rhymes were digitally recorded. The CD version used Sierra's SCI1 (early). The floppy version used Sierra's SCI1.1. The versions are not absolutely identical. For example, the CD version directly starts with the Mixed-Up Mother Goose main-menu. The floppy version starts with the animated Sierra logo. Main-menu button placements are also different. Some minor changes to gameplay were also made, namely reducing the requirement of bringing Old King Cole three items to just one so there were only eighteen missing items to find instead of twenty. A new, sentient statue character was also added to Banbury Cross who informs the player to bring him a Hobby Horse, whereas in earlier versions of the game it was the only rhyme that did not have a character to give the player advice.
- In 1995, the final remake was released, entitled Mixed-Up Mother Goose Deluxe. It featured further improved SVGA graphics and a bonus audio CD, as well as the introduction of different melodies and styles of music.

The "Classic's Reillustrated" (SCI EGA) version was also planned and announced for the Atari ST line of computers via Sierra Online's magazine: Sierra News Magazine (Spring 1991) and owners were instructed to send disk #1 or the front cover of the manual along with a check or money order for $15 to upgrade their copy to the "Classic's Reillustrated" version. A retail boxed version was not sold in stores.

Two versions of Mixed-Up Mother Goose are included in The Roberta Williams Anthology, a collection of games designed by Roberta Williams. Those are the original 1987 version and the 1991 multimedia CD remake.

== Reception ==
Compute! stated "I can't think of a better way to teach kids the classical nursery rhymes". It won the 1991 Software Publishers Association Excellence in Software Award for Best Early Education Program.

According to Sierra On-Line, Mixed-Up Mother Goose sold over 500,000 copies by 1995.

== See also ==
- Nursery rhyme
- Mother Goose
- List of graphic adventure games
