= Cannonball Blitz =

1982 video game

- Developer: On-Line Systems
- Publisher: On-Line Systems
- Designer: Olaf Lubeck
- Platforms: Apple II, TI-99/4A, VIC-20
- Release: NA: 1982
- Genre: Platform
- Mode: Single-player

Cannonball Blitz is a game programmed by Olaf Lubeck for the Apple II and published by On-Line Systems in 1982. It was ported to the VIC-20 and TI-99/4A computers. An historic military spin on Donkey Kong, rolling cannonballs replace barrels, a soldier stands in for the large ape, and the objective of the first level is a flag rather than a kidnapped woman.

== Gameplay ==
There are three different screens, the third of which is particularly challenging. After completing the third level, the player views a small celebration scene and then restarts at the first level. Repeated levels only differ from those of the first round in the harsher timing patterns of the game.

== Development ==
Cannonball Blitz achieved some notoriety in the Apple hacking community as being difficult to crack. Track 17, sector D of the game contains the message "YOU'LL NEVER CRACK IT".

== Reception ==
Ron Brinkmann reviewed the game for Computer Gaming World, and stated that "In the final analysis, Cannonball Blitz is a game every bit as challenging and fun as the arcade original. It will give you hours (days, months, years) of enjoyment."

Ahoy! wrote that "Cannonball Blitz [for the VIC-20], make no mistake about it, is Donkey Kong in dress blues. Not a bloody thing new here. However, you're going to find it a barrel of fun". The magazine favorably reviewed the animation and the "unbelievable" sound effects, and concluded that it was "a very good version of a fine game".
