= Maximum Pool =

2000 video game

- Developer: Dynamix
- Publisher: Sierra Sports
- Series: 3D Ultra
- Platforms: Windows, Mac OS, Dreamcast
- Release: Windows: NA: September 8, 2000; EU: October 2000; Dreamcast: NA: November 16, 2000
- Genre: Sports
- Modes: Single-player, multiplayer

Maximum Pool is a video game developed by Dynamix and published by Sierra On-Line under their Sierra Sports label for Windows and Dreamcast in 2000. It is the tenth game in the 3D Ultra series, and the successor to the 1999 game Cool Pool.

== Reception ==
Reception

Aggregate score
Aggregator	Score	
Aggregator	Dreamcast	PC
Metacritic	59/100	71/100

Review scores
Publication	Score	
Publication	Dreamcast	PC
GameSpot	5/10	6.3/10
GameZone	8.5/10	8.6/10
IGN	7.8/10	7.9/10
PC Zone	N/A	59%

The game received "mixed or average reviews" on both platforms according to the review aggregation website Metacritic. GameZone gave the PC version a favorable review, nearly two months before it was released.
