= Field & Stream: Trophy Bass 4 =

2000 video game

- Developer: Dynamix
- Publisher: Sierra Sports
- Platform: Microsoft Windows
- Release: NA: May 25, 2000
- Genre: Sports (Fishing)
- Mode: Single-player

Field & Stream: Trophy Bass 4, also known as simply Trophy Bass 4, is a fishing video game, developed by Dynamix and published by Sierra On-Line for Microsoft Windows in 2000. It is the fourth game in the Trophy Bass series.

== Reception ==
Reception

Aggregate score
Aggregator	Score
GameRankings	74%

Review scores
Publication	Score
CNET Gamecenter	7/10
Computer Games Strategy Plus	3.5/5
Eurogamer	7/10
GameSpot	8.2/10
GameZone	7/10
IGN	8/10
PC Zone	42%

The game received above-average reviews according to the review aggregation website GameRankings.
