= Field & Stream: Trophy Bass 3D =

1999 video game

- Developer: Dynamix
- Publisher: Sierra Sports
- Platform: Microsoft Windows
- Release: NA: July 6, 1999; EU: 1999
- Genre: Sports (Fishing)
- Mode: Single-player

Field & Stream: Trophy Bass 3D, also known as simply Trophy Bass 3D, is a fishing video game developed by Dynamix and published by Sierra Sports for Microsoft Windows in 1999. It is the third game in the Trophy Bass series.

== Reception ==
Reception

Aggregate score
Aggregator	Score
GameRankings	70%

Review scores
Publication	Score
CNET Gamecenter	7/10
Computer Games Strategy Plus	3.5/5
GamePro	3.5/5
PC Accelerator	5/10

The game received above-average reviews according to the review aggregation website GameRankings.
