= The Lost Mind of Dr. Brain =

1995 video game

- Developers: Bright Star Technology; Coktel Vision
- Publisher: Sierra On-Line
- Producer: Sherry Wrana
- Designer: Ward Makielski
- Programmer: Mark Marion
- Composer: Jonathan Cunningham
- Series: Dr. Brain
- Platforms: Macintosh, Windows 3.x
- Release: August 1995
- Genres: Educational, Adventure

The Lost Mind of Dr. Brain is the third installment of the original Dr. Brain series, which were educational games published by Sierra On-Line.

== Storyline ==
An experiment mixed up the minds of Dr. Brain and his lab rat Rathbone, and puzzles need to be solved to put Dr. Brain's brain back together again.

== Gameplay ==
The main navigation area

The Lost Mind of Dr. Brain features science-related puzzles similar to the first two games in the series. Previous installments featured a large, semi-free-roaming environment, but The Lost Mind of Dr. Brain restricts the player to a single area (Dr. Brain's laboratory), with puzzles accessed from a central 'map' screen. Dr. Brain's niece, Elaina (voiced by Kayce Glasse) replaces Dr. Brain as host and serves as a guide to Dr. Brain's mental pathways. While the previous games' puzzles ranged across a variety of disciplines (both Castle and Island contained memory and word puzzles, as well as puzzles related to art and the sciences), The Lost Mind of Dr. Brain focuses solely on the human brain, with puzzles related to spatial orientation, memorization, and symbolic association.

Dreamland

== Reception ==
Reception

Review scores
Publication	Score
Macworld	4/5
Next Generation	3/5

Award
Publication	Award
SPA Award	1995 - Best Home Learning Game for Adolescents

The game scored positive reviews by Computer Shopper as entertaining in August 1995 and by PC Gamer for having "educational value" in December 1996.

Next Generation gave three stars out of five for Macintosh version of the game, and commented that its gameplay and simplicity is appropriate for younger audience.
