= Castle of Dr. Brain =

1991 video game

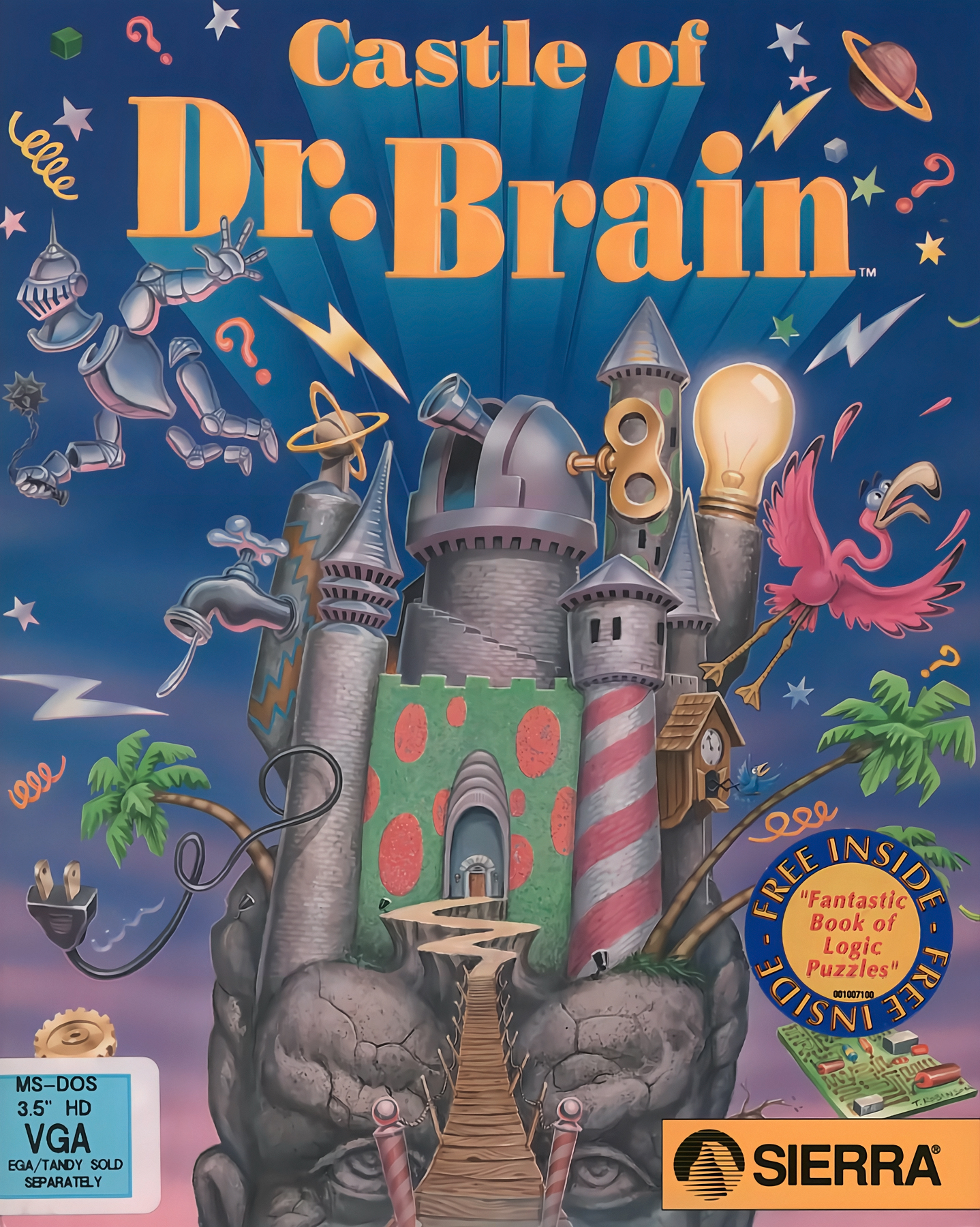
- Cover art
- Developer: Sierra On-Line
- Publisher: Sierra On-Line
- Directors: Corey Cole; Bill Davis (creative)
- Producer: Stuart Moulder
- Designer: Corey Cole
- Composers: Mark Seibert; Ken Allen
- Series: Dr. Brain
- Engine: SCI1
- Platforms: Amiga, MS-DOS, Mac OS, NEC PC-9801
- Release: 1991 (DOS); 1992
- Genres: Educational, puzzle adventure
- Mode: Single-player

Castle of Dr. Brain is an educational video game released in 1991 by Sierra On-Line. It is a puzzle adventure game.

== Gameplay ==
The objective of the game is to successfully navigate the puzzles Dr. Brain has set up in order to become the mad scientist's assistant, a position Dr. Brain had advertised in the local classified section. To enter the castle, the player must play a game of memory at the front gate. Inside, the player must solve puzzles within the hallways and rooms of the castle. There are also three mazes in which the player must guide an elevator between and among different floors.

Many of the puzzles require skill in mathematics and logic, but the game requires knowledge in a broad range of subjects. One puzzle requires the player to solve a cryptogram, and the penultimate level deals primarily with astronomy. In a rather surreal level, the player must put together a jigsaw puzzle which, when completed, becomes a room through which the player passes to go to the next level.

Castle of Dr. Brain features a point-and-click mode of gameplay and three levels of difficulty, which the player can change at any time. The player can also change the pointer from a hand, which will interact with puzzles, to an eye, which will give information about an object, occasionally leading to clues to help solve puzzles. Typically, pointing the hand or the eye at an object that is not a puzzle will give a joke about it. The game also features Hint Coins, which the player earns by solving puzzles and can use for assistance on puzzles with which they are having difficulty.

== Development ==
The proposal of Dr. Brain was an idea by Corey Cole. The game would become first in the Sierra Discovery series (which was established in 1992). Cole wanted to implement the elements of science and technology in an adventure game. Sierra gave him the okay to develop the game after he presented his concept to them. Many of Cole's inspirations came from games like Mastermind, Hangman and others.

== Reception ==
Reception

Review scores
Publication	Score
Dragon	4/5
Amiga Format	61%
CU Amiga	78%

In 1992, Dragon gave the game 4 out of 5 stars. Computer Gaming World's Charles Ardai praised Dr. Brain, calling the game "one of the most entertaining agglomerations of puzzles ever stuffed into a single package", so well constructed "that it has a real shot at converting puzzle haters into puzzle lovers".

== See also ==
- Dr. Brain series
