= Hoyle Card Games =

2000 video game

- Developer: Sandbox Studios
- Publisher: Sierra Attractions
- Platform: Game Boy Color
- Release: 2000
- Modes: Single-player, Multiplayer

Hoyle Card Games is a Game Boy Color-only video game that was developed by Sandbox Studios and published by Sierra On-Line under their Sierra Attractions label.

== Gameplay ==
The package includes eight competitive card games, such as cribbage and go fish, as well as six variations of solitaire. Competitive games are played against the game's artificial intelligence (AI), or against another player. Two players can use two separate Game Boy Color consoles and connect them with a link cable, or use a single machine and alternate their turns. The AI can prove a challenging opponent since the game lacks any difficulty settings. Each game's rules are explained within a menu. Each player must pick an avatar to represent them before they can begin, such as a crocodile or a teddy bear.

== Reception ==
Jay Semerad of allgame stated that the game's lack of difficulty settings and tough AI can result in players struggling to win against the computer, adding that Hoyle's books are a better reference for players wishing to learn how to play than the game's menus. He also stated, "Despite its faults, Hoyle Card Games is a good addition to any card player's game library." IGN's Craig Harris stated, "Despite its issues in design, the game's still a great purchase and a real keeper." Both Semerad and Harris stated that players unfamiliar with the games should learn the rules elsewhere before trying to use Hoyle Card Games.

== See also ==
- Edmond Hoyle, publisher of the 18th Century Mr. Hoyle's Treatises of Whist, Quadrille, Piquet, Chess and Back-Gammon
