= Bright Star Technology =

Bright Star Technology, Inc. was founded by Elon Gasper and Nedra Goedert during the early 1980s and was a key player in multimedia technology. Well-known titles from Bright Star include HyperAnimation, Alphabet Blocks, and the Talking Tutors series. Bright Star was acquired by Sierra On-Line in 1992, and was a cornerstone of Sierra's educational games department.

Prior to starting the company, Gasper was teaching computer science at California Institute of Technology while trying to teach his daughter how to read. He became inspired by the lip-synchronization positions charts used in Disney animation. This inspired him to create animated tutors whose mouths moved realistically to humans. This continued to Early Math, which follows the curriculum from the National Association of Teachers of Mathematics.

A.J.'s World was developed by Sierra's subsidiaries Coktel Vision and Bright Star Technology.

== Bright Star's games ==
- Alphabet Blocks
- AJ's World of Language
- AJ's World of Math
- AJ's World of Discovery
- Spelling Jungle (also sold as Basic Spelling and Yobi's Basic Spelling Tricks; code-named Spelling Demons)
- Spelling Blizzard (also sold as Advanced Spelling)
- Kid's Typing
- Early Math
- Beginning Reading
- The Lost Mind of Dr. Brain
- Discover ABC and 123 with Hickory & Me (also sold as separate ABC and 123 products; produced in cooperation with Golden Books Family Entertainment)
- Discover Math and Spelling with Monker (also sold as separate Math and Spelling products; produced in cooperation with Golden Books Family Entertainment)

== Bright Star's language education products ==
- Berlitz Live! Spanish (produced in cooperation with Berlitz International, Inc.)
- Berlitz Live! Japanese (produced in cooperation with Berlitz International, Inc.)
