= Cool Pool =

1999 video game

- Developer: Dynamix
- Publisher: Sierra Attractions
- Platform: Windows
- Release: WW: 1999
- Genres: Sports, Cue Sports

Cool Pool, also marketed as 3D Ultra Cool Pool, is a 3D pool computer game by Sierra Attractions, and the ninth game in the 3D Ultra Series. It has an online playing feature. This game offers classic pool games such as eight-ball, but it also includes its own fantastical pool games such as Chameleon Ball and Mad Bomber, which use elements that cannot exist in real life such as color changes and explosions. This game also allows online play one on one against other players and offers text based chat during play.

A successor to the game, called Maximum Pool, was released for Microsoft Windows and Dreamcast in 2000.

On 16 August 2007 Sierra shut down the public pool game servers used by Cool Pool. "Online Forever" is a project started at PAuth.com which aims to keep Cool Pool running online, though that has since also shut down.

With the help of a patch, the game will see the public pool rooms now being hosted by members of the community. Both Cool Pool can be patched to see these pool room servers.
