= Spelling Jungle =

1993 video game

- Developer(s): Bright Star Technology
- Publisher(s): Sierra On-Line
- Producer(s): Lynn Luukinen
- Designer(s): Mark Swardstrom
- Programmer(s): Mark Marion; Steve Schonberger
- Artist(s): Ward Makielski
- Composer(s): Gordon van Eskröm
- Platform(s): Windows 3.x, Mac OS
- Release: 1993
- Genre(s): Educational, Puzzle, Adventure
- Mode(s): Single player

Spelling Jungle, also known as Yobi's Basic Spelling Tricks or Yobi's Magic Spelling Tricks, is an educational adventure game created by Bright Star Technology (Note: Bright Star Technology was acquired by Sierra Entertainment in 1992.) and released by Sierra in 1993 for both Windows and Macintosh PCs. The program is designed to strengthen reading, spelling, and logic skills in children ages 7–10.

The objective of Spelling Jungle is to paddle a raft up the river and stop the flooding at its source. The player must make frequent stops in their journey and complete puzzles, where letter tiles have to be walked over to spell out a certain word. The player must also avoid enemies like lions, alligators, or demons, in order to advance further up the river. The game features 101 levels total that become more difficult and complex as the player ventures further upriver.

Spelling Jungle was also released under the name "Yobi's Magic Spelling Tricks" and "Yobi's Basic Spelling Tricks". It is also referred to as "Spelling Demons" in the game's owner's manual In 1994, Sierra released a sequel to the game entitled "Spelling Blizzard"

== Gameplay ==
The puzzle map consists of the play area on top with displays of collected letter tiles and other collected items at the top and a word mnemonic for a level's particular word at the bottom.

Spelling Jungle is an adventure game whose objective is to paddle to the head of the river to stop the flooding. The game consists of two distinct areas: a puzzle map, where the player must spell out a particular word by collecting letter tiles in the right order, and a spelling test, where the player must correctly spell a certain number of words before advancing. The objective of the puzzle map portion of the game is to collect letter tiles by walking over them in the correct order to spell the given word. A puzzle map gives the player an overhead view of the area and provides the word which must be spelled for that particular round as well as a mnemonic at the bottom of the screen to help remember how to spell the word. Early levels are simple, requiring the player to only gather letters in the correct order, but the puzzles become more difficult as the player advances through the game. For later levels, while collecting letter tiles, the player must also avoid enemies, such as rhinoceroses and tigers, avoid hazards, like hot coals and bottomless pits, and make use of tools, such as boulders and vehicles, in order to gather all the letters. Once the player has collected all the letters in the correct order, most hazards disappear. The player must then find a way to get back to the raft in order to move on to the next section. The second phase of each level consists of a spelling test, where the player is asked to spell words, starting with the one that was featured on the previous puzzle map. If the player spells the word correctly, the raft will move slightly more forward. The player will advance to the next puzzle map if enough words are spelled correctly.

== Development ==
Spelling Jungle was originally distributed by Bright Star Technology under the name "Basic Spelling Tricks". When Bright Star Technology was acquired by Sierra, the game was released under the name "Yobi's Magic Spelling Tricks", but it is also referred to as "Yobi's Basic Spelling Tricks", "Basic Spelling", and "Demon Spelling Tricks". In 1994, the name was changed again to "Spelling Jungle", though no significant changes were made to the program itself. The same year, a sequel to Spelling Jungle was released entitled "Spelling Blizzard". This sequel, though more difficult than the original, is nearly identical in gameplay and story except that it has an arctic theme rather than a jungle theme.

== Reception ==
Computer Gaming World in 1994 said of Yobi's Magic Spelling Tricks for Macintosh that "For kids who find Nintendo games a challenge, the mazes are very appealing". The magazine concluded it "offers good educational content, some rather challenging puzzles, and a competitive motif that keeps youngsters interested".

The sequel, Spelling Blizzard, received a score of 2.5 out of 5 at Allgame.
