= List of The Guild episodes =

The Guild is an online sitcom about the lives of an online guild "The Knights of Good", with each webisode 3–9 minutes long. The first episode was posted July 27, 2007. It was released via The Guild's official website, effinfunny.com and YouTube; on iTunes and Zune Marketplace as a podcast; and is available for download from the Xbox Live Marketplace. The show follows the life of Codex, the healer of The Knights of Good, who attempts to lead a normal life after one of her guildmates shows up on her doorstep.

The Guild was written by Felicia Day (who stars as Codex), directed by Jane Selle Morgan and Greg Benson (season 1), Sean Becker (seasons 2–5), and Chris Preksta (season 6), and produced by Felicia Day, Jane Selle Morgan and Kim Evey.

Overall, 70 episodes of The Guild were released over six seasons. All information, lengths, descriptions and release dates, prior to season 5, as they appeared on The Guild's website.

The sixth season of The Guild premiered on Felicia Day's YouTube channel, Geek & Sundry on October 2, 2012. Following the conclusion of the sixth season, Day announced that the series was complete.

== Series overview ==
Season	Episodes	Originally aired	
Season	Episodes	First aired	Last aired
1	10	July 27, 2007	May 15, 2008
2	12	November 25, 2008	February 17, 2009
3	12	August 25, 2009	November 24, 2009
4	12	July 13, 2010	October 5, 2010
5	12	July 26, 2011	October 11, 2011
6	12	October 2, 2012	January 8, 2013

== Episodes ==
=== Season 1 (2007–2008) ===
No. overall	No. in season	Title	Directed by	Written by	Running time	Original release date
1	1	"Wake-Up Call"	Jane Selle Morgan	Felicia Day	3:59	July 27, 2007
Cyd Sherman's online gaming habit brings more than she bargains for... a stressed-out therapist and an even more stressed-out life.
2	2	"Zaboo'd"	Jane Selle Morgan	Felicia Day	2:53	August 14, 2007
Cyd Sherman's imaginary world becomes all too real when a gnome warlock shows up on her doorstep.
3	3	"The Macro Problem"	Jane Selle Morgan	Felicia Day	4:33	September 7, 2007
Codex's problem with Zaboo gets sidetracked by a crisis in the Guild.
4	4	"Cheesybeards"	Jane Selle Morgan	Felicia Day	5:11	November 1, 2007
The Knights of Good finally meet face to face and... it's awkward.
5	5	"Rather Be Raiding"	Jane Selle Morgan	Felicia Day	6:54	December 1, 2007
Codex struggles to keep the Guild meeting on track, and everything turns out great! Not.
6	6	"Total Wipe"	Greg Benson	Felicia Day	5:39	January 24, 2008
Emotions run high in the Guild after the disastrous Cheesybeards meeting.
7	7	"Home Invasion"	Greg Benson	Felicia Day	4:10	February 21, 2008
Codex discovers why Zaboo is so weird. It's genetic.
8	8	"Tipping Point"	Greg Benson	Felicia Day	3:34	March 20, 2008
It's up to Codex to grow a spine, eep.
9	9	"Owning Bladezz"	Greg Benson	Felicia Day	4:53	April 16, 2008
The Guild confronts Bladezz and Codex holds the trump card.
10	10	"Boss Fight"	Greg Benson	Felicia Day	6:24	May 15, 2008
The Knights of Good must face their toughest enemy: Zaboo's Mom.

=== Season 2 (2008–2009) ===
No. overall	No. in season	Title	Directed by	Written by	Running time	Original release date
11	1	"Link the Loot"	Sean Michael Becker	Felicia Day	5:38	November 25, 2008
Codex adjusts to Zaboo as a house-guest, while the rest of the Guild finds a valuable object in the game.
12	2	"Block'd"	Sean Michael Becker	Felicia Day	5:12	December 2, 2008
Clara blows up in-game and out, while Codex lays down the law to Zaboo.
13	3	"Quest Accepted!"	Sean Michael Becker	Felicia Day	5:36	December 9, 2009
Zaboo begins his journey on the road to manhood; Codex learns more about Vork than she'd ever want to know.
14	4	"Heroic Encounter"	Sean Michael Becker	Felicia Day	6:54	December 23, 2009
Codex meets her new neighbor; the guys and girls of The Guild dish in separate channels.
15	5	"Sacking Up"	Sean Michael Becker	Felicia Day	6:59	December 30, 2008
Zaboo continues his quest to become a man, while Tink tries to "help" Codex.
16	6	"Blow Out"	Sean Michael Becker	Felicia Day	6:50	January 6, 2009
The girls give Codex advice, and friction between Vork and Zaboo escalates.
17	7	"Panic Attack"	Sean Michael Becker	Felicia Day	6:36	January 13, 2009
Codex deals with yet another Guildie on her doorstep.
18	8	"Emergency!"	Sean Michael Becker	Felicia Day	5:46	January 20, 2009
Vork calls a Guild meeting to deal with the server downtime.
19	9	"Grouping Up"	Sean Michael Becker	Felicia Day	6:53	January 27, 2009
The Guild splits up into guys' and girls' night while the game server goes down.
20	10	"Socializing Sucks"	Sean Michael Becker	Felicia Day	8:35	February 3, 2009
Bladezz takes control of guys' night; Codex's neighbor shows up at her party.
21	11	"Collision Course"	Sean Michael Becker	Felicia Day	6:25	February 10, 2009
The guys crash girls' night. Zaboo gets a rude awakening.
22	12	"Fight!"	Sean Michael Becker	Felicia Day	8:44	February 17, 2009
Characters collide (literally).

=== Season 3 (2009) ===
No. overall	No. in season	Title	Directed by	Written by	Running time	Original release date
23	1	"Expansion Time"	Sean Michael Becker	Felicia Day	5:29	August 25, 2009
The Guild waits in line for their game's expansion to come out, and deals with inter-personal tension in... dysfunctional ways.
24	2	"Anarchy!"	Sean Michael Becker	Felicia Day	8:08	September 8, 2009
A group of rival gamers cut in front of The Guild at the game store. And they aren't nice about it.
25	3	"Player Down"	Sean Michael Becker	Felicia Day	5:44	September 15, 2009
The Guild tries to cope with one man down. Or maybe two.
26	4	"Get It Back!"	Sean Michael Becker	Felicia Day	7:22	September 22, 2009
Codex enters enemy territory to get her Guildie back.
27	5	"Application'd"	Sean Michael Becker	Felicia Day	5:49	September 29, 2009
The Guild struggles to fill Tink's spot.
28	6	"Newbtastic"	Sean Michael Becker	Felicia Day	7:46	October 6, 2009
Mr. Wiggly joins the Guild... unfortunately.
29	7	"Coping and Stuff"	Sean Michael Becker	Felicia Day	6:46	October 13, 2009
The Axis of Anarchy thwarts Codex's attempt to counter their attacks with logic and reasonableness.
30	8	"+10 to Bravery"	Sean Michael Becker	Felicia Day	7:20	October 20, 2009
Codex takes desperate measures to save the Guild. She even goes outside!
31	9	"Wit's End"	Sean Michael Becker	Felicia Day	8:05	November 3, 2009
The Guild crumbles under the Axis of Anarchy's attacks.
32	10	"The Return!"	Sean Michael Becker	Felicia Day	6:53	November 10, 2009
Like a Phoenix rising from the ashes, Vork returns to rebuild the Guild. Not really that dramatic, but you get the idea.
33	11	"LAN Off"	Sean Michael Becker	Felicia Day	7:57	November 17, 2009
The Axis of Anarchy and The Knights of Good face off.
34	12	"Hero"	Sean Michael Becker	Felicia Day	8:47	November 24, 2009
It's up to Codex to save The Guild all by her lonesome. Solo. No pressure, really.

=== Season 4 (2010) ===
No. overall	No. in season	Title	Directed by	Written by	Running time	Original release date
35	1	"Epic Guilt"	Sean Michael Becker	Felicia Day	5:40	July 13, 2010
Codex wrestles with telling the Guild about her date with Fawkes.
36	2	"Strange Allies"	Sean Michael Becker	Felicia Day	6:32	July 20, 2010
Codex gets some computer help while the Guild struggles with how to build a Guild Hall.
37	3	"Supportive'd"	Sean Michael Becker	Felicia Day	6:26	August 3, 2010
Vork's competitive spirit kicks in and Codex is awestruck by Zaboo's supportive nature.
38	4	"Moving On!"	Sean Michael Becker	Felicia Day	7:07	August 10, 2010
Codex deals with her Fawkes “relationship” problem, and another “Cheesy” door opens for her.
39	5	"Loot Envy"	Sean Michael Becker	Felicia Day	5:04	August 17, 2010
Codex's new job brings out unexpected feelings in the Guild. Clara gets a good idea.
40	6	"Weird Respawn"	Sean Michael Becker	Felicia Day	6:52	August 24, 2010
Zaboo struggles to deal with his mother's new attitude; Codex juggles work and gaming.
41	7	"Awkward Birthday!"	Sean Michael Becker	Felicia Day	7:11	August 31, 2010
Fawkes' arrival at dinner throws Codex for a loop; Clara and Tink's business congeals into a plan.
42	8	"Busted"	Sean Michael Becker	Felicia Day	6:49	September 7, 2010
Vork and Avinashi form a weird partnership: Codex is busted.
43	9	"Pirate Paddy"	Sean Michael Becker	Felicia Day	7:15	September 14, 2010
When Codex's creative endeavors do not pay off, she turns to the Guild for support.
44	10	"Festival of the Sea"	Sean Michael Becker	Felicia Day	8:13	September 21, 2010
The Guild joins forces to help Codex with her job.
45	11	"Hostile Takeovers"	Sean Michael Becker	Felicia Day	7:14	September 28, 2010
Vork refuses to put his honor aside; Zaboo does something right for a change.
46	12	"Guild Hall"	Sean Michael Becker	Felicia Day	7:46	October 5, 2010
The Guild's problems come to a head INSIDE the game!

=== Season 5 (2011) ===
No. overall	No. in season	Title	Directed by	Written by	Running time	Original release date
47	1	"Road Trip!"	Sean Michael Becker	Felicia Day	6:34	July 26, 2011
The Guild carpools to the gaming convention.
48	2	"Crash Pad"	Sean Michael Becker	Felicia Day	6:11	August 2, 2011
The Guild shares a hotel room overnight after Bladezz's originally promised accommodation plans fall through.
49	3	"Megagame-o-ramacon!"	Sean Michael Becker	Felicia Day	9:23	August 9, 2011
The Guild visits the convention, but separately, and everything does not go well for each member.
50	4	"Ends and Begins"	Sean Michael Becker	Felicia Day	8:10	August 11, 2011
Codex finally confronts Zaboo about her feelings and learns a secret about the game, while Clara comes across a "shiny" steampunk booth at the convention, and Bladezz discovers he has fans. (With guest appearances by Brent Spiner, Grant Imahara, Wilson Cleveland and Tay Zonday.)
51	5	"Focus Problems"	Sean Michael Becker	Felicia Day	7:55	August 16, 2011
Codex continues to worry about the future of the game, the Guild and her personal life. The Guild also attends a convention party.
52	6	"Revolving Doors"	Sean Michael Becker	Felicia Day	9:02	August 23, 2011
Codex finally talks to Floyd, the game's creator. Meanwhile, Clara asks to join the steampunk booth, and Vork becomes Bladezz's "manager". (With a guest appearance by Nathan Fillion.)
53	7	"Downturn"	Sean Michael Becker	Felicia Day	9:07	September 6, 2011
Zaboo's Seat-Savers network gets serious as Clara tries to cozy up with a new group of friends. (With guest appearances by Erin Gray, Richard Hatch and Neil Gaiman.)
54	8	"Social Traumas"	Sean Michael Becker	Felicia Day	12:03	September 13, 2011
Codex meets with Tink and her family, as Bladezz and Vork hobnob at a party. (With guest appearances by Amy Berg, Bonnie Burton, Eliza Dushku, Colin Ferguson, Rick Fox, Grant Imahara, Dichen Lachman, Zachary Levi, Tom Lenk, and Kevin Sorbo.)
55	9	"Invite Accepted"	Sean Michael Becker	Felicia Day	8:49	September 20, 2011
Zaboo pays back Clara's favor as Tink and Codex set out on a mission together.
56	10	"Strategy Timez"	Sean Michael Becker	Felicia Day	5:53	September 29, 2011
Codex attempts to reconcile and strategise with the Guild back in the hotel room about the future of the group and the game.
57	11	"Costume Contest"	Sean Michael Becker	Felicia Day	8:28	October 4, 2011
The Guild infiltrates the convention's costume contest in an effort to meet with Floyd and prevent the game from being ruined. (With a guest appearance by Stan Lee.)
58	12	"Grande Finale"	Sean Michael Becker	Felicia Day	9:58	October 11, 2011
Codex tries to solve problems with the help of the Guild at the cosplay contest and finally confronts Floyd about the game's future.

=== Season 6 (2012–2013) ===
No. overall	No. in season	Title	Directed by	Written by	Running time	Original release date
59	1	"Dream Questline"	Chris Preksta	Felicia Day	7:50	October 2, 2012
Codex starts her dream job at The Game, but finds out it's not everything she thought it would be when Floyd is rude to the employees, and they give her the cold shoulder. Meanwhile, the other members of the Guild deal with personal gaming setbacks in the form of his Bladezz's mother's new boyfriend, Tink's connections letting her down, and Clara's family troubles interrupting her gaming time.
60	2	"New Party Members"	Chris Preksta	Felicia Day	9:25	October 9, 2012
Codex has her first company meeting; however, after an intended game expansion is revealed by her fellow employees, Floyd becomes angry and criticises Codex for not backing him up when she reacts favorably to it. Clara gets a new houseguest in the form of Bladezz while Vork plans a day with his lady and tries to give Zaboo some tips about finding his "soulmate"... until Zaboo uncovers that Madeleine has protested in the nude, and a shocked Vork kicks him out.
61	3	"Makeshift Solutions"	Chris Preksta	Felicia Day	6:45	October 16, 2012
Although Codex is initially uncertain of her future employment at the Game, Floyd has gotten over his anger and tells Codex he just doesn't want somebody "nagging" him all the time and wants her to test the new gaming expansion. Meanwhile, Zaboo tries creating his ideal partner (on paper), Tink struggles with her college work, Clara tries to show Wiggly she's a competent parent, and Vork uncovers more "upsetting" things about Madeleine.
62	4	"Raid Timez"	Chris Preksta	Felicia Day	8:11	October 23, 2012
After informing the other Guild members of her testing of the new expansion, Codex is horrified when they arrive at the Game HQ and fears that she could be fired... especially after Floyd finds Zaboo. Vork also confronts Madeleine about her activist past.
63	5	"Strange Frenemies"	Chris Preksta	Felicia Day	7:18	October 30, 2012
Codex tries to defuse the situation with Zaboo, but he ends up helping Floyd with his personal problems, and Codex in convincing Floyd to try the expansion as well. Vork falls out with Madeleine and Bladezz tries to convince Clara to make more bad parenting videos.
64	6	"Into the Breach"	Chris Preksta	Felicia Day	9:06	November 6, 2012
As Tink and Zaboo try out the test server of the new underwater expansion, Vork confronts Floyd about his gaming problems (with Codex trying to mediate), and Bladezz tries to keep Wiggly amused while Clara practices for her "mom-vice" (mother advice) videos.
65	7	"Occupy HQ"	Chris Preksta	Felicia Day	10:14	November 20, 2012
Vork stages a sit-down protest for gamers' rights outside of the Game HQ while Zaboo falls in love with NPC bartender Sabina on the test server (and Tink grows closer to admin Donovan), Clara leaves Bladezz with Wiggly, and Codex tries to resolve Floyd's issues.
66	8	"Dialogue Options"	Chris Preksta	Felicia Day	6:32	November 27, 2012
Codex steps into the game with Tink’s help. Vork’s attempt at currying Madeline’s favor backfires.
67	9	"The Case of the Game Leak"	Chris Preksta	Felicia Day	8:17	December 4, 2012
Codex tries to investigate the Game leak. Clara's vlogging has a surprising effect and Vork discovers the drawbacks of advocacy.
68	10	"Tipping Points"	Chris Preksta	Felicia Day	8:23	December 11, 2012
Vork's protest picks up steam as Controller Grrl and Black Knight raise the stakes. Codex attempts to talk Floyd down and Tink uncovers some unpleasant truths.
69	11	"Raid HQ"	Chris Preksta	Felicia Day	6:56	December 18, 2012
Codex and Zaboo try to leave Game HQ, but face complications as Vork's protest outside turns into a riot.
70	12	"End Game"	Chris Preksta	Felicia Day	9:01	January 8, 2013
Codex and Zaboo fix the protest by making campaign signs and new reporters told the world what happened.

== Specials and musicals ==
No.	Title	Running time	Original release date
S1	"Christmas Raid Carol"	1:49	December 12, 2007
The Guild's Season 1 Christmas Special!
S2	"Very Guild Christmas"	2:47	December 16, 2008
The Guild reinterprets "Twas the Night Before Christmas".
S3	"(Do You Wanna Date My) Avatar"	3:39	August 17, 2009
Original song.
S4	"Halloween!"	3:43	October 27, 2009
The Guild's Season 3 Halloween Special!
S5	"Game On"	3:50	July 27, 2010
Zaboo convinces Codex to resume game play by transporting them to a Bollywood-inspired world of song and dance. Vibrant costumes and a large cast of extras give it an over-the-top look and feel.
S6	"Taste My Pirate Patty"	1:01	September 14, 2010
"Cheesy Beards" commercial.
S7	"I'm the One That's Cool"	4:16	April 2, 2012
Original song celebrating the rise of geek culture, with a performance on-stage by the Guild members (with Codex on lead vocals, Zaboo on drums, Tink and Bladezz on electric guitar, Vork on bass and Clara on keyboard). The plot of the video sees the Guild members play bullied high schoolers: Codex is pushed in a pool by her crush at a party; Zaboo is pushed into a locker; Tink has a dodgeball thrown at her head during gym class; Clara has a carton of milk poured over her head by a cheerleader; Vork is pantsed by two "cool" guys; and Bladezz has his head dunked into a toilet. Towards the end of the video, Codex crowdsurfs and various Guild members mouth "I'm the one that's cool" after their ordeals.
