= Chris Pope =

American audio producer (born 1978)

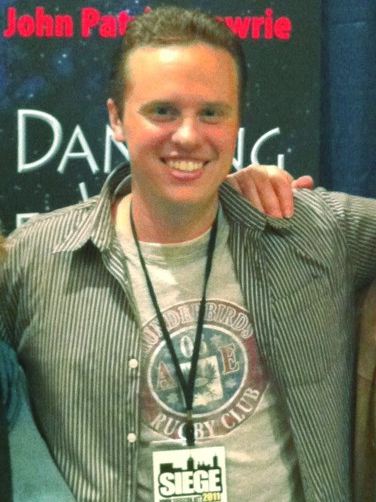
- Pope in 2011
- Occupations: Audio producer, entertainment industry social media publicist
- Years active: 2001–present
- Notable work: Talking Toons with Rob Paulsen, Speaking of Voiceover with Bob Bergen

Chris Pope is an American internet personality, video game developer, producer, social media professional, podcaster. Pope is best known by fans as the SpacePope.

Pope first gained internet notability in 2001 when "The Day Report" announced his breaking of the Arcade Pac-Man Turbo world record as recorded by chief scoreboard record keeper Walter Day with Twin Galaxies. In 2008 he launched Tech Jives LLC, a social media and podcast production company. Pope is the creator of multiple live interview-based podcasts, including some of the first to do live interviews with celebrity film and voice actors, such as Robert Clotworthy (Voice of Jim Raynor), Rob Paulsen (Voice of Raphael, Yakko Warner and Pinky), Jen Taylor (Voice of Cortana).

In 2010, Pope also launched, as part of The Tech Jives network, an entertainment industry-focused social media publicist company called "Social Stars Web", which handles web hosting, Twitter management and Facebook fan building for people involved in film acting, voice acting, writing, and singing. Ellen McLain who voices "GLaDOS" on the popular video game series Portal and Portal 2, as well as her husband John Patrick Lowrie are amongst those he manages.

In 2012, Pope joined forces with the Two Guys From Andromeda to Kickstart a video game called SpaceVenture.

In 2015, Pope voice acted in the Cluck Yegger in Escape From The Planet of The Poultroid video game as the Radio Announcer.

== Video game development ==
In April 2012, Pope began acting as an Executive Producer, Programmer and campaign promoter, overseeing their Kickstarter campaign and helping generate excitement around the project. Chris played a key role in helping Guys From Andromeda LLC get crowdfunding through Kickstarter by taking the reins to generate excitement around the return of the Two Guys From Andromeda. This was in regard to their new game idea, SpaceVenture. After the SpaceVenture Kickstarter campaign successfully raised $539,767, he began works with his partners, Scott Murphy and Mark Crowe (Original creators of the Space Quest series from Sierra On-Line) in making the new game become a reality. Fans of his involvement with Guys From Andromeda also sometimes refer to him as the SpacePope.

In 2015, Pope and Crowe shifted focus on to a portion of SpaceVenture that didn't require as much writing. This was due to Murphy needing some time away from the project for personal reasons. The game sequence features a hero character named Cluck Yegger. The Cluck Yegger sequence of SpaceVenture was planned from the beginning to play a key role in the game. To bring more funding into the project, Crowe and Pope decided to make the Cluck Yegger sequence into a game and release it to the public. The game was named Cluck Yegger in Escape From The Planet of The Poultroid. It was released to Kickstarter backers of SpaceVenture on October 29. 2015, and then was greenlit on Steam and released publicly on November 9, 2015.

== Production ==
In April 2010, Pope's show "Apptastic iGame Reviewers" was the first ever to interview the makers of the number one selling game in America Angry Birds.

Pope also produces audio for celebrity voice actor Rob Paulsen's "Talkin Toons with Rob Paulsen" as well as provides the social media publicity.

== Social Media Publicist Work ==
Since November 2010, Pope began working with some of the cast from the web series The Guild in the effort of building their celebrity profiles on the web. Robin Thorsen who plays "Clara", Vincent Caso who plays "Bladezz", Brett Sheridan who plays "Mr. Wiggley", J. Teddy Garces who plays "Bruiser" and Sean Michael Becker who is the Director of the show are amongst a few.

Notably on the web series "Sound Advice On The Web" he worked extensively with creator J. Teddy Garces on fan, publicity, web, and social media presence.

In May 2011, after doing an interview with Game of Thrones actor Kristian Nairn (plays Hodor), Kristian has recently begun work regarding his entire web presence with Pope and is in the process of starting a new audio production podcast that will include fellow friend and actor Jake Stormoen.
