= J. Teddy Garces =

American actor

- Born: September 12, 1974 (age 51); New York City, New York
- Occupation: Actor
- Years active: 2003-present

J. Teddy Garces (born September 12, 1974) is an American film, television and stage actor, best known for his portrayal of Bruiser in the web series The Guild and Julian in Ted Sampon: Househusband. He was born Joseph Teddy Garces at St. Lukes Hospital in Manhattan, New York City, to a Dominican father Joseph Garces and a Dominican mother (internationally recognized poet) Yvelisse Fanith.

In 2011 Teddy filmed the first few episodes of his web series Sound Advice On The Web in which he casts, writes and plays in. Teddy plays Dr. Theodore W. Evington III, a dysfunctional therapist who gives his clients raw and uncensored "Sound Advice". The slogan for the show is "He doesn’t mean to be rude, He just is...". Web publicity and social media were given over to audio producer and web publicist Chris Pope of the Tech Jives network and Social Stars Web. Casting in this film includes some of the cast from The Guild such as director Sean Michael Becker, Teal Sherer, Jeff Lewis, as well as some of the behind the scenes crew.

== Filmography ==
Film
Year	Film	Role
2009	Lost Angels	Lashaun
2009	Ladrón que Roba a Ladrón	Building Guard #2
2007	Under the Same Moon	Police Officer Jones
2006	El Cantante	(voice)

Television
Year	Show	Role	# of Episodes
2013	Zane's The Jump Off	Spencer Martinez	Main cast
2012	Hollywood Heights	Security Guard	1 episode
2011	The Cape	Thug #1	unknown episodes
2009	The Guild	Bruiser	7 episodes
2009	Ted Sampon: Househusband	Julian	5 episodes
2009	iCarly	Prisoner #2	1 episode
2007	Cold Case	Uniform Cop	1 episode
2005	One Life to Live	Asa's Guard #2	1 episode
2004	Law and Order: Criminal Intent	Jake	1 episode
