= Third Eye (podcast) =

Fantasy podcast

Third Eye is a scripted fantasy podcast produced by Audible and created by Felicia Day.

== Background ==
Third Eye is a scripted fantasy comedy podcast and is an Audible Original. Day came up with the idea for the show in 2015. The podcast debuted on October 5, 2023. The show is narrated by Neil Gaiman. The story is set in San Francisco and is based on Day's experiences living in Los Angeles.

Laurel Pettigrew, a failed wizard and the protagonist of the show, lives with Frank Fletcher the vampire and Sybil the fairy. Pettigrew was the "Chosen One", but lost to the villan Tybus and she is dealing with the consequences of her failure.

The show won an Earphones Award from AudioFile Magazine. The show was number 3 on the list of top fiction shows in October 2023.

=== Cast and characters ===
- Alan Tudyk as Vlad
- Amir Talai as Belachi
- Amy Okuda
- Carolyn Seymour as Deliah
- Christopher Judge as Tybus
- Danny Pudi as Charles
- Felicia Day as Laurel Pettigrew
- Harvey Guillen
- Hudson Yang as Ben
- Jade Hykush as Baba Yaga
- Janet Varney as Tracey Pettigrew
- Jeff Lewis
- Jonah Ray Rodrigues
- Kate Miccuci
- Kristian Nairn
- Laraine Newman as Ruby
- Lila Sage Bromley as Teen Laurel
- LilyPichu as Kate Chen
- London Hughes as Sybil
- Neil Gaiman Narrator
- Nyima Funk as River Momma
- Paget Brewster as Tracey Gillben
- Phil LaMarr
- Sean Astin as Frank Fletcher
- Sean Giambrone as Gary
- Steve Agee
- Troy Baker
- Weird Al Yankovic
- Wil Wheaton as Robigus

== See also ==
- List of fantasy podcasts
