= Teal Sherer =

American actress

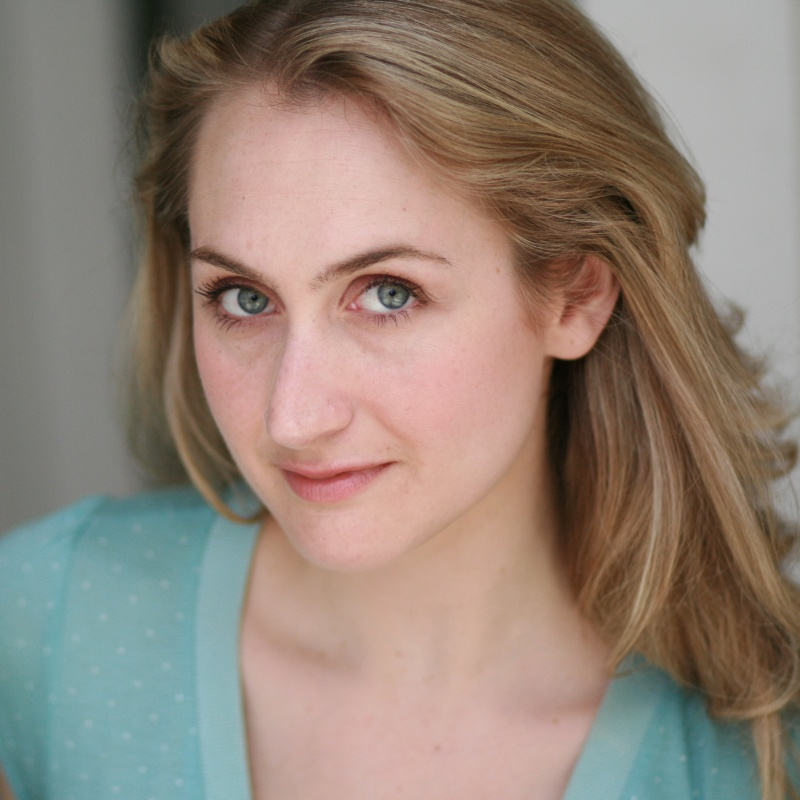
- Teal Sherer
- Other name: Teal Sherer Alsaleh
- Occupations: Actor, Producer, Activist
- Spouse: Ali Alsaleh
- Website: www.tealsherer.com

Teal Sherer is an American actress with a physical disability who is an advocate for the inclusion of performers with disabilities in the entertainment industry. She is best known for her portrayal of Venom in the web series The Guild and as herself in her own series "My Gimpy Life". She was also a member of Full Radius Dance.

Sherer also teaches dance and drama classes for children with disabilities and is an advocate for the inclusion of performers with disabilities within the entertainment industry. She is a member of SAG-AFTRA Performers with Disabilities Committee.

== Early life, family and education ==
Teal Sherer was born to Suzanne and Charles Sherer, and raised near Knoxville, Tennessee. At age 14, en route to a Labor Day fireworks show, Teal was involved in an automobile accident. Injuries to her back left her paraplegic. She regained her independence and mobility through undergoing therapy at the Shepherd Center in Atlanta, Georgia.

Sherer graduated from Lenoir City High School, then enrolled at Oglethorpe University. While a student there, she found her passion for acting. She graduated in 2003.

== Career ==
In 2004, while still living in Atlanta, Sherer was cast in her first professional acting role, in Joseph Sargent's HBO television film Warm Springs (2005), in which Kenneth Branagh starred as Franklin D. Roosevelt.

Sherer played Venom, a rival guild leader, in the web series The Guild.

In 2011, Sherer created a television pilot, My Gimpy Life, envisioned as a comedy. Written by Gabe Uhr and directed by Sean Becker, the series tells the story of a disabled actress in Hollywood. In 2014, the series was renewed for a second season thanks to a Kickstarter campaign.

Sherer received Oglethorpe University's Young Alumni Award.

== Advocacy ==
Sherer's advocacy includes serving on the SAG-AFTRA Performers with Disabilities Committee and teaching dance and drama classes for children with disabilities.

== Personal life ==
In 2012, she married Ali Alsaleh.

== Filmography ==
- 2005 Warm Springs
- 2007 The Guild (TV series) – Venom
- 2012 My Gimpy Life (TV series) – Fictionalized version of herself
- 2014 Survivor's Remorse (TV series)
- 2014 NCIS: New Orleans (TV series)
- 2022 Significant Other
