= Cluck Yegger in Escape from the Planet of the Poultroid =

2015 video game

Cluck Yegger in Escape From The Planet of The Poultroid
- Developer: Guys From Andromeda LLC
- Designers: Mark Crowe; Chris Pope
- Programmer: Chris Pope
- Artist: Mark Crowe
- Composer: Ken Allen
- Platforms: Windows, Linux, OS X, iOS
- Release: WW: November 9, 2015
- Genre: Action game; casual game; strategy
- Mode: Single-player

Cluck Yegger in Escape From The Planet of the Poultroid is an indie survival horror point-and-click video game designed by Mark Crowe and Chris Pope of Guys From Andromeda LLC. The game centers around a heroic rooster character named Cluck Yegger, who after crash landing on the planet Poultroid in front of a chicken factory called BFC, must defend himself from mutated chickens that have been sent by his nemesis, the evil "Colonel Zanderz". The game is an offshoot of the Kickstarted video game called "SpaceVenture" created by the Two Guys From Andromeda. It was released privately to backers of SpaceVenture on October 29. 2015, and then was greenlit on Steam and released publicly on November 9, 2015.

== Gameplay ==
The game play mechanics are similar to the first Five Nights at Freddy's game. The player plays from the perspective of Cluck Yegger, who is trapped in the cockpit of his crashed ship. The player must use cameras that are located on the ship as well as in the BFC factory to keep track of chicken locations. Throughout the game, chickens will periodically move to different locations in the direction of the cockpit. The player can manipulate lights to see and distract chickens from getting to the cockpit as well as closing doors located in the cockpit to prevent mutant chickens from attacking.

Also, from the third night, a giant chicken will hatch from an egg located in one of the cameras and will wander around the field, and the player must hear his steps to check if it's in front of the ship, the player may close the shield if they spot the giant chicken outside of the ship to prevent him from attacking, and must not open it again until after they hear it roar. Occasionally, lightning will strike Cluck's ship and will disable cameras temporarily, along with randomly closing or opening doors or the shield.

A night starts out at 7:00 p.m. and Cluck Yegger must survive until sunrise at 7:00 a.m. the next day. There are seven nights total that get progressively harder. A night lasts approximately five real time minutes. The ship is running on battery power, so the player must also consider that, in order to keep from running out of energy.

The game also has a Tame Mode, which replaces all of the jumpscares by a picture of a cat dressed in a chicken costume, while playing some happy music while being jumpscared.

== Development ==
Cluck Yegger in Escape From The Planet of the Poultroid was developed using the Unity game engine. The game was a collaboration between partners Mark Crowe and Chris Pope as they worked on the SpaceVenture adventure game after seeking a sequence to be used in game for the Cluck Yegger character. With their other partner, Scott Murphy, needing to take some time away from the SpaceVenture project for personal reasons, the two decided to focus on building the playable Cluck Yegger based game sequence, which wouldn't require writing from Murphy. To increase the productivity on SpaceVenture, Crowe and Pope decided to sell the game publicly to raise additional funding. They kept the development team extremely small with only Crowe and Pope designing the game play. Pope did the programming with support from developer Patrick Johnston while Crowe focused on the artwork with the help of a couple of artists. Development of the game lasted about seven months from start to finish with the team also working on bits of SpaceVenture during its creation.
