= Fernando Chien =

Taiwanese actor and stunt performer

- Born: Chien Fu-Nan; October 6, 1974 (age 51); Taipei, Taiwan
- Occupations: Actor, stunt performer
- Years active: 1998–present

Fernando Chien (Chinese: 錢佛南; pinyin: Qián Fónán; born October 6, 1974), sometimes credited as Funan Chien, is a Taiwanese-Canadian actor and stunt performer. He is known for his roles in the film Fast Five and TNT's action show The Last Ship.

== Biography ==
Fernando Chien was born in Taipei, Taiwan under the name Chien Fu-Nan. When he moved to Canada, he adopted the name of Fernando.

After moving to Canada, Chien developed an interest in acting, and performed in musical theater productions in college. Although he had practiced Taekwondo and Karate when he was 6 years old, it wasn't until his 20s that he started practicing martial arts more seriously, studying Hung-Gar Kung fu in Montreal, Quebec.

In 2002, Chien moved to Los Angeles to pursue a career in film and TV. He was also introduced to Wushu, and then Jiu-Jitsu and Muay Thai. Chien studied under Gokor Chivichyan and Gene LeBell at the Hayastan MMA Academy. He currently practices at the Werdum Combat Team under Fabricio Werdum and Andrew Hagar.

After moving to Los Angeles, Chien moved between acting and stunt performing. He became part of the action team Reel Kick, which features some of the most sought after stunt performers. Chien also studied acting at Michael Beach's Actors Gym and Lee Strasberg Studio, among others.

During his career, Chien has worked in films like Crank, The Mummy: Tomb of the Dragon Emperor, Red Dawn, Fast Five, and Iron Man 3. He has also worked on TV shows like NCIS: Los Angeles, The Guild, and Star Trek: Enterprise. In 2016, he had a recurring role as President Peng Wu on TNT's The Last Ship.

== Filmography ==
Film
| Year | Title | Role | Notes |
|---|---|---|---|
| 1998 | Provocateur | Buddhist Monk | |
| 1998 | Dead End | Hawkeye | |
| 2000 | The Art of War | Zeng Zi | |
| 2005 | Soldier of God | Featured fighter | |
| 2006 | Honor | Pit Fighter | |
| 2007 | T.K.O. | Lin | |
| 2008 | Beyond the Ring | Rigan Machado student | |
| 2008 | The Mummy: Tomb of the Dragon Emperor | Yang's Soldier #3 | |
| 2009 | Angel of Death | Skinny | |
| 2010 | Bunraku | Killer No. 4 | |
| 2011 | Fast Five | Wilkes | |
| 2011 | Warrior | Fenroy | |
| 2012 | Red Dawn | Lt. Pak | |
| 2013 | Iron Man 3 | Extremis Soldier #5 | |
| 2014 | Transcendence | Heng | |
| 2014 | Outcast | Captain Wu | |
| 2016 | The Accountant | Sorkis | |
| 2017 | The Concessionaires Must Die! | Cacao Customer | |
| 2017 | Dirty Lies | Man In Suit | |
| 2017 | Sun Dogs | Lee | |
| 2017 | Unspoken: Diary of an Assassin | | |
| 2019 | Rogue Warfare 2: The Hunt | Xu | |
| 2021 | Shang-Chi and the Legend of the Ten Rings | Gao Lei | |
