= Amy Okuda =

American actress (born 1989)

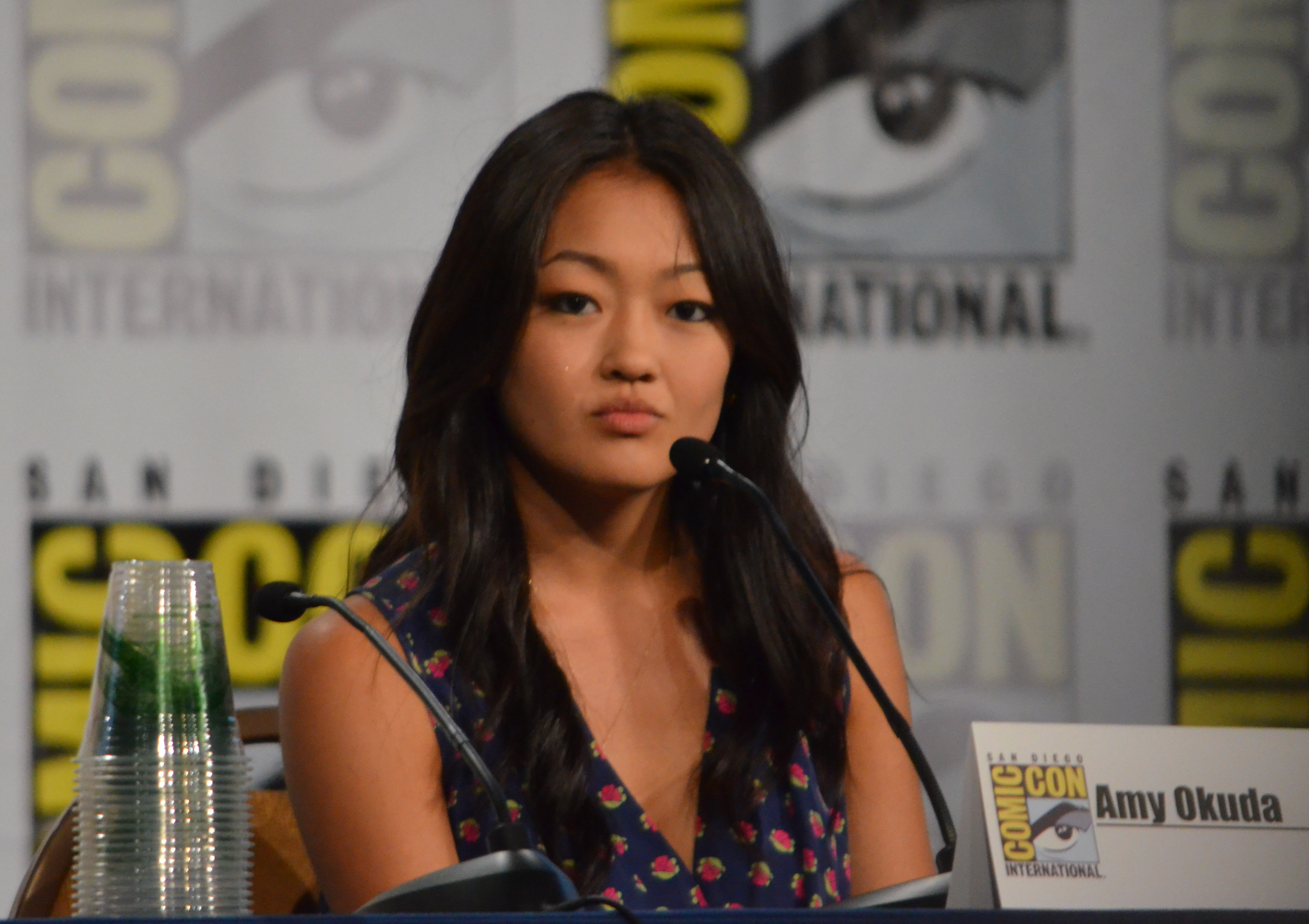
- Okuda in July 2012
- Born: Torrance, California, U.S.
- Occupation: Actress
- Years active: 2007–present
- Spouse: Mitchell Hashimoto (m. 2018)
- Children: 2

Amy Okuda is an American actress. She portrayed Julia Sasaki on the Netflix comedy-drama Atypical (2017–2021) and Tinkerballa/April Lou in the web series The Guild.

== Early life ==
Okuda was born in Torrance, California. Her early years focused on basketball, which she played from the age of five. She began dancing in the seventh grade and took up acting a few years later.

== Career ==
In 2007, she landed a role in the TV show Californication with David Duchovny. Also in 2007, Okuda got the role of Tinkerballa in The Guild, her first recurring role. She appeared in 60 of the series' 66 episodes throughout all six seasons.

In 2010, she appeared in a short educational film about the Spitzer Space Telescope; while flying to Saturn, her character observes a giant ring newly discovered in 2009 by NASA's Spitzer Space Telescope.

In 2011, she appeared in the Break.com original music video "Tonight, I'm Frakking You" which is a science fiction and video game parody of the song "Tonight (I'm Lovin' You)" by Enrique Iglesias. In the video, she appears along with Alessandra Torresani, Kunal Nayyar, and Matthew Brown.

In November 2011, she was cast in a horror-social satire film titled Chastity Bites. She plays queen bee "mean girl" Ashley Thorne.

In June 2012, she played Samantha in the YouTube channel YOMYOMF's series BFFs. Later that month, Amy played a recurring role in the web series Away We Happened on the YouTube channel Wong Fu Productions. The film starred Jen Chae and Victor Kim.

In April 2013, she appeared in the episode "The Bachelor" of The Middle (season 4, episode 19) as Sue's Tennis opponent, and on the TableTop web series.

On March 25, 2014, she appeared in Brooklyn Nine-Nine's season finale "Charges and Specs" (season 1, episode 22) as Sgt. Terry Jeffords' former girlfriend. She reprised the role in two later episodes. In 2014, she starred in José Manuel Cravioto's horror thriller film Reversal, along Keith Johnson and Bianca Malinowski.

In 2015, she appeared in Season 2 of Shonda Rhimes' television drama series How to Get Away With Murder on ABC. Okuda also appeared as Christine Tanaka in two episodes of the television series adapted from Philip K. Dick's novel The Man in the High Castle.

In 2016, Okuda was cast as Julia Sasaki in the Netflix comedy television series Atypical, which debuted on August 11, 2017.

== Personal life ==
On November 3, 2018, Okuda married fiancé Mitchell Hashimoto.

== Filmography ==
=== Film ===
Year	Title	Role	Notes
2009	Do You Wanna Date My Avatar	Tinkerballa	Video short
2010	Spaceship Spitzer: Bots of Both Worlds	Captain	Short film
2011	Elf Sabers	Elf Amy	Short film
2012	It Has Begun: Bananapocalypse	Herself	Short film
2013	Chastity Bites	Ashley	
2013	It's Dark Here	Mean Girl	
2014	Operation Barn Owl	Amy	Short film
2014	House Meeting	Ghost Maid	Short film
2015	The Wedding Ringer	Lurch's Wife Marci	
2015	Bound to Vengeance	Captive Girl 1	
2015	Hello, My Name is Doris	Des	
2015	If the Internet Was a High School	Kotaku	Video short
2016	The Sibling Code	Sheryl	Short film
2016	All Exchanges Final	Erin	Short film
TBA	Liked	Amanda	Post-Production

=== Television ===
Year	Title	Role	Notes
2007–2013	The Guild	Tinkerballa	Web series; Main role; 57 episodes
2007	Californication	Mia's Classmate	1 episode
2011	B-Sides	Unknown	1 episode
2012	Jane By Design	Asian Girl	1 episode
2012	My Gimpy Life	Amy	1 episode
2012	Shake It Up!	Hideko Wantanabe	1 episode
2012	Bite Me	Zombie Kelly	5 episodes
2012	BFFs	Sam	6 episodes
2012	Away We Happened	Lynn	
2012	The Flog	Guest/Host	2 episodes
2013, 2016	TableTop	Guest	3 episodes
2013	The Middle	Opponent	Guest roles; 1 episode
2013	Crash & Bernstein	Slater	Guest roles; 1 episode
2014	Brooklyn Nine-Nine	Chiaki	Guest roles; 1 episode
2014	Grey's Anatomy	Chelsea Ansell	Guest roles; 1 episode
2014	Awkward	Cammie	Guest roles; 1 episode
2014	Bleach	Rolando	Television movie
2015	A to Z	Becky	1 episode
2015	The Man in the High Castle	Christine Tanaka	2 episodes
2015	Entertainment Weekly	Herself	Television special
2015–2016	How to Get Away with Murder	Catherine Hapstall	11 episodes
2016	Scream Queens	Anna Plaisance	1 episode
2016–2020	The Good Place	Jessica/Gayle	Recurring role
2017–2021	Atypical	Julia Sasaki	Main role (season 1 and 2) Recurring (season 3)
2017–2021	Brooklyn Nine-Nine	Chiaki	Guest role; 2 episodes
2017	MacGyver	Zoe Kimura	1 episode
2018	So Close	Crystal	Television film
2019	The Selection	Gayle	Spin-off of The Good Place; Main role; 6 episodes
