= Not Cancer =

- House episode
- Episode no.: Season 5 Episode 2
- Directed by: David Straiton
- Written by: David Shore & Lawrence Kaplow
- Original air date: September 23, 2008

Guest appearances
- Michael Weston as Lucas Douglas; Felicia Day as Apple; Tim Conlon as Dr. O'Shea; Elaine Kagan as Frank's wife; Eric Kaldor as Frank

Episode chronology
← Previous "Dying Changes Everything"	Next → "Adverse Events"
- House season 5

"Not Cancer" is the second episode of the fifth season of House and the eighty-eighth episode overall. It aired on Fox on September 23, 2008.

== Plot ==
Two women are playing tennis when one of them collapses, clutching at her chest. On a construction site, a crane worker dies in his seat. A fighter dies in the middle of a MMA match. A tuba instructor starts coughing up blood in the middle of a lesson and expires. Thirteen interrupts a college class to confirm the math instructor, Apple, had a corneal transplant five years ago, then informs her that four other people who received a transplant from the same donor died.

Apple is taken to the hospital where they determine four of the victims are dead and one more, an elderly man named Frank, is on the verge of death. The team is unable to determine a common denominator and House is more concerned about Wilson's absence. Finally House goes with a diagnosis of cancer and orders them to run more tests. He then approaches Dr. O'Shea as a possible Wilson-replacement. Foreman arrives to inform House that Apple's eye is failing and they have to remove it. She had taken an eye test and had gotten it wildly wrong, but did not squint. House then states that her eye thinks it is fine, but that eyes do not think, but only brains. He then states that it is too late to remove her eye, and instead has to remove her head, as he brandishes a giant meat cleaver. As he swings the meat cleaver towards her, Apple starts screaming.

However it's soon revealed that this is nothing more than Apple's imagination and back in reality, House realizes that Apple is hallucinating.

House reviews a video of the kickboxer looking for signs of brain damage. The coffee machine repairman interrupts to berate Taub and Thirteen for being idiots. They conclude he's a private investigator and House admits hiring him. House is impressed at his thoroughness.

They need to do a brain biopsy and appeal to Frank's wife for approval. Taub reluctantly tells Frank's wife the truth. The wife refuses to allow the procedure. Frank suddenly stops breathing and dies despite Taub's efforts. They determine Frank's brain is clean and House still suspects cancer. Kutner suggests a perforated intestine and bacterial infection that spread through the blood and infected all the organs.

House meets with Lucas, who figures that House wants to hire him to check out Wilson. House asks if there is something, and Lucas admits there is not. House returns to the hospital where Kutner and Foreman inform him the colonoscopy proved clean. House still believes in cancer and Kutner suggests they use a high-pressure water jet to apply pressure to Frank's colon. There are no leaks but Foreman spots what appears to be a core lesion.

Apple's heart starts racing but there's no indication her colon is leaking. The team has nothing new and House orders chemo for the cancer he suspects she has. He goes to her room and signals an emergency when he cannot find the medical records on Apple's bed. He then asks Apple to sign a consent form to receive chemotherapy. As she signs, Apple talks about how she was an architect but gave it up after her corneal transplant. Apple notes that House does not seem much different, and he notes that at least he has not given up.

Lucas tells House that Wilson has a new job. He points a woman out that he's following because he likes her, then informs House that Wilson is attending grief counseling and Cameron and Cuddy have been at his house several times. Lucas starts following the girl and House has to trail along. The girl finally confronts them and says they're making her uncomfortable. After she leaves, Lucas notes that Wilson has not said anything about House. House gets a page and heads to the hospital where Apple is vomiting from the chemo but her system is stabilizing. Foreman is surprised House was right, but House concludes that it is not cancer.

Back in differential, House notes he never thought it was cancer but thought it acted like cancer. Now he wants to find something that is similar to cancer, and notes the last patient was using methotrexate for his arthritis, which allegedly would also have treated any cancer. He goes to Wilson and asks for an epiphany, wanting to bounce ideas off of him. Wilson tries to shut him out and House asks how he's doing. Wilson begs him not to do this so he can move on, and House accuses him of talking to the others. House admits he hired a private detective to watch Wilson because they're not friends anymore, then tries to convince Wilson to help with a diagnosis. Wilson refuses to participate and warns he will not answer the door the next time House knocks.

Lucas is outside and tries to advise House on friendship, and inadvertently gives House a new way to think about a possible diagnosis. House goes to see Cuddy and shows her Apple's CAT scan. It indicates something is in there that her brain is not compensating for. House believes that the donor had cancer stem cells spread in his organs, and when transplanted these spread and attached themselves to the recipients' various organs, which eventually stopped working. He wants to open up Apple's skull before it's too late for her, and Cuddy wonders if House is going to do something to make Apple crash prematurely. She puts security guards on Apple's room, so House convinces Lucas to disguise himself as a nurse and replace Apple's IV meds with a saline solution. She crashes and is taken into surgery where they have to open up her skull. House suggests from the observation deck that they check her IV. Chase suddenly realizes that House had somehow had the IV switched, triggering the operation by deception. Chase wants to abort the operation, but House observes that they've already completed the most dangerous procedure, so they might as well continue. Lucas comes into the observation gallery and is alarmed that the patient whose IV he had switched is undergoing such a serious operation. House explains that he is a better liar than Lucas. Meanwhile, the doctors finish the operation, using a neural net on Apple's brain to detect and remove defective brain cells.

Later, House goes to visit Apple and explains that the world is ugly but not as ugly as she thought. Her brain was not working properly and the transplanted brain cells were making things dull and unattractive to her. He takes off the bandages over her eyes and Apple sees the world with normal vision. House asks "How do I look?", and she responds "You look sad."

House is in his office and calls to ask Lucas if he would work on retainer.

== Reception ==
"Not Cancer" garnered positive reviews from critics. Zack Handlen of The A.V. Club gave this episode an A− rating, while James Chamberlin of IGN awarded the episode 8.6/10.
