= Zane's The Jump Off =

- Created by: Zane
- Starring: Amin Joseph; Sean Riggs; J. Teddy Garces; Damian Raven; Kinyumba Mutakabbir
- Country of origin: United States
- Original language: English
- No. of seasons: 1
- No. of episodes: 13

Production
- Executive producer: Zane
- Running time: 30 minutes
- Production companies: Planet Zane Productions; MRG Entertainment; HBO Entertainment

Original release
- Network: Cinemax
- Release: March 29 – June 21, 2013

Zane's The Jump Off is an American television series on the Cinemax network, created by author Zane. The series follows the lives of five successful African American men from all sorts of backgrounds as it tells the stories of their everyday lives. The series aired from March 29 to June 21, 2013.

== Plot ==
Set in Miami, the series follows five 30-something African American fraternity brothers and the various women in their lives as they grapple with issues with commitment, fidelity and forgiveness.

== Cast and characters ==
=== Main ===
- Amin Joseph - Dmitri Vance
- Sean Riggs - Earnest Bishop
- J. Teddy Garces - Spencer Martinez
- Damian Raven - Gabriel Turner
- Kinyumba Mutakabbir - Fenwick "Woody" Wood

=== Recurring ===
- Joe Torry - Chandler Bishop
- Tanjareen Martin - Lauren
- Gregg Wayans - Harris Jones
- Johanna Quintero - Portia Bishop
- Latifah Creswell - Brenda Lancaster
- Monique Cash - Nandi Carter
- Wlehyonneh Toles - Kenya Wood
- Sasha Van Duyn - Aspen Turner
- Jen Morillo - Sabrina
- Jude B. Lanston - Doctor Stovall
- Erika Jordan - Jennifer

== Production ==
In September 2011, it was announced that Amin Joseph had officially joined the cast. Filming had been underway around this time, with production taking place in Los Angeles.

== Release ==
The series premiered on Cinemax's late-night block Max After Dark on Friday, March 29, 2013 at 11 PM. Prior to the show's premiere, a press event for the series was held at the Xen Lounge in Studio City.

== Episodes ==
No.	Title	Directed by	Written by	Original release date	US viewers (millions)
1	"First Down"	Jean Moody	Zane	March 29, 2013	N/A
Football star Dmitri hosts a party at his nightclub, The Jump Off, with his frat brothers to celebrate the break-up of Woody Wood's marriage. Meanwhile, their respective wives get together on their own.
2	"Man-In-Motion"	Jean Moody	Zane	April 5, 2013	N/A
Earnest's return after a five-year prison stretch ruffles some feathers, especially his ex-wife's.
3	"Pass Interference"	Jean Moody	Zane	April 12, 2013	N/A
Earnest runs into Portia and her new boyfriend; Brenda talks about moving in with Dmitri, but he's already thinking about moving on; and Woody considers hiring a sexy new singer for the club. Meanwhile, Spencer gets a visit at the radio station from his friend-with-benefits.
4	"Playing the Field"	Jean Moody	Zane	April 19, 2013	N/A
While Dmitri is with Brenda, he fantasizes about Lauren; Woody and the new singer mix business with pleasure; and Earnest is attracted to a comely bar patron. Meanwhile, Spencer has problems with just being considered a booty call to Jennifer; and Gabriel suspects there may be something more to the close relationship his wife has developed with his best friend.
5	"Illegal Motion"	Jean Moody	Zane	April 26, 2013	N/A
Earnest uncovers a secret about Rita, while the host of a dating show seeks eligible men and Lauren helps a high-school football player gain access to his adoption papers.
6	"Red Flag"	Jean Moody	Zane	May 3, 2013	N/A
Lauren is shocked by the person she finds at Dmitri's place after accepting his offer to meet for drinks; and Earnest grows closer to his sister-in-law, but a surprise visit from Portia distracts him. Meanwhile, Gabriel rekindles his romance with Aspen.
7	"Turnover"	Jean Moody	Zane	May 10, 2013	N/A
Lauren steps in to help after Dmitri receives some unsettling news; Woody decides he wants Kenya back; and Spencer finally steps up and makes known his feelings for Nandi. Meanwhile, a livid Brenda gets kicked to the curb.
8	"Backfield in Motion"	Jean Moody	Zane	May 17, 2013	N/A
While his friends search for a suicidal Earnest, ex-wife Portia finds him first; and an obsessed Brenda goes off the deep end when Dmitri calls a halt to their affair. Meanwhile, Aspen receives incriminating photos of Mocha and Chandler in the mail.
9	"Offensive Holding"	Jean Moody	Zane	May 24, 2013	N/A
Earnest and Portia's reunion heats up; Spencer and Nandi continue to deny their feelings for each other; and Dmitri worries about the possible end of his career and a woman he scorned. Meanwhile, Kenya files for divorce, sending a dejected Woody once again into the arms of Giselle.
10	"Ball Control"	Jean Moody	Zane	May 31, 2013	N/A
Sabrina, Kenya and Portia deal with feelings for the men in their lives; Brenda becomes more of a threat to Dmitri; and an angry Harris relents and reaches out to his biological father.
11	"Possession"	Jean Moody	Zane	June 7, 2013	N/A
Spencer's passionate night with Jennifer leads him to a startling revelation about Nandi, while Brenda employs voodoo in an effort to win back Dmitri. Later, Earnest seeks revenge against his brother.
12	"Down By Contact"	Jean Moody	Zane	June 14, 2013	N/A
Dmitri awaits word on his surgery; the Spencer-Nandi relationship heats up; and Giselle threatens to tell Kenya about her affair with Woody. Meanwhile, Brenda spies on Dmitri and Lauren; and Earnest's revenge plot thickens.
13	"Two Minute Drill"	Jean Moody	Zane	June 21, 2013	N/A
In the series finale, Dmitri's surprise birthday party for Lauren proves quite revelatory and surprising, especially after Brenda sneaks into the bash and takes a couple of partygoers hostage at gunpoint.
