= (Do You Wanna Date My) Avatar =

Single by Felicia Day
- Released: August 17, 2009
- Recorded: 2009
- Genre: Electropop
- Length: 3:39
- Label: The Guild
- Songwriters: Felicia Day, Jed Whedon
- Producer: Felicia Day

Felicia Day singles chronology
"(Do You Wanna Date My) Avatar" (2009)	"Game On" (2010)

"(Do You Wanna Date My) Avatar" is a 2009 song created and performed by the cast of the web series The Guild, with lead vocals by singer-actress Felicia Day. The lyrics were written by Day and the music was written by musical composer Jed Whedon, who also directed the music video.

== Background ==
When interviewed at San Diego Comic-Con, Day attributed her inspiration for the song to 1980s and 1990s-style dance music. She conveyed an obsession with Stacey Q's "Two of Hearts" in particular, which is apparent with Day including a familiar "come on, come on" in the lyrics. The song includes a rap portion performed by Guild co-stars Jeff Lewis and Sandeep Parikh.

While Day composed the lyrics herself, whilst listening to "really bad 1990s dance songs", she turned to screenwriter Jed Whedon (with whom she had worked on internet musical Dr. Horrible's Sing Along Blog and TV series Dollhouse) to compose the music. Whedon and his wife Maurissa Tancharoen are credited as backup singers on the video, and Tancharoen also contributes her talent as a back-up dancer; this was the first time Whedon (who also directed the video) had seen her dance.

== Music video ==
The music video features the entire cast of The Guild dressed up as their own online "avatar" characters from the web series.

Day comments that "In a regular Hollywood situation it would have cost us hundreds of thousands of dollars", but the video was recorded in Whedon's closet three weeks prior to its general release. Whedon stated that in directing the video (his first time "directing anything" according to his wife) he "basically wanted to do a relatively cliché dance video as if it were about medieval fantasy warriors who took themselves really seriously," in which respect he felt the cast delivered "perfectly and hilariously". He used stop motion techniques to compensate for those members of The Guild cast who do not have dancing skills. Then, to make it "legit" as a video, Whedon made sure to include "actual sexy footage of Felicia, stellar dancing with Amy [Okuda] showing off her chops, and of course, raining money."

Jeff Lewis describes himself as "not good at anything at all - dancing or rap" and comments, "they were able to make what I did [the rap sequence] fairly entertaining". Lewis recorded four lines of rap at Jed's house which were later synced up to the video. He was told to dance or "do anything" for three minutes, which "felt really bad and embarrassing... awful" but was impressed when the footage was slowed down, and became "more than I anticipated or imagined in a music video."

== Reception ==
The video reached 1 million YouTube hits in less than 2 days. By April 2012–33 months after release—the YouTube video had 19,710,073 hits, averaging around 600,000 hits a month. As of July 2025, it has 31 million views.

On August 6, 2010 the song became a playable track on Rock Band 2 via the Rock Band Network. BBC entertainment reporter Mark Savage describes the song as "[r]eminiscent of Ace of Base's 'All That She Wants'" and describes the rap by Jeff Lewis and Sandeep Parikh as "intricate and clearly masterful".

TV writer, director and producer Joss Whedon (brother of composer Jed Whedon), who has worked with Day on Buffy the Vampire Slayer, Dr. Horrible and Dollhouse, gave his support for the song. On weblog Whedonesque.com, Whedon implored his fanbase to support the video, saying "I really want this to be big. It's indie (which is the most important part), it's awesome... So help me out. Let's go the extra mile here and DESTROY THE SWIFTBOT!"
