= Vincent Caso =

American actor and writer

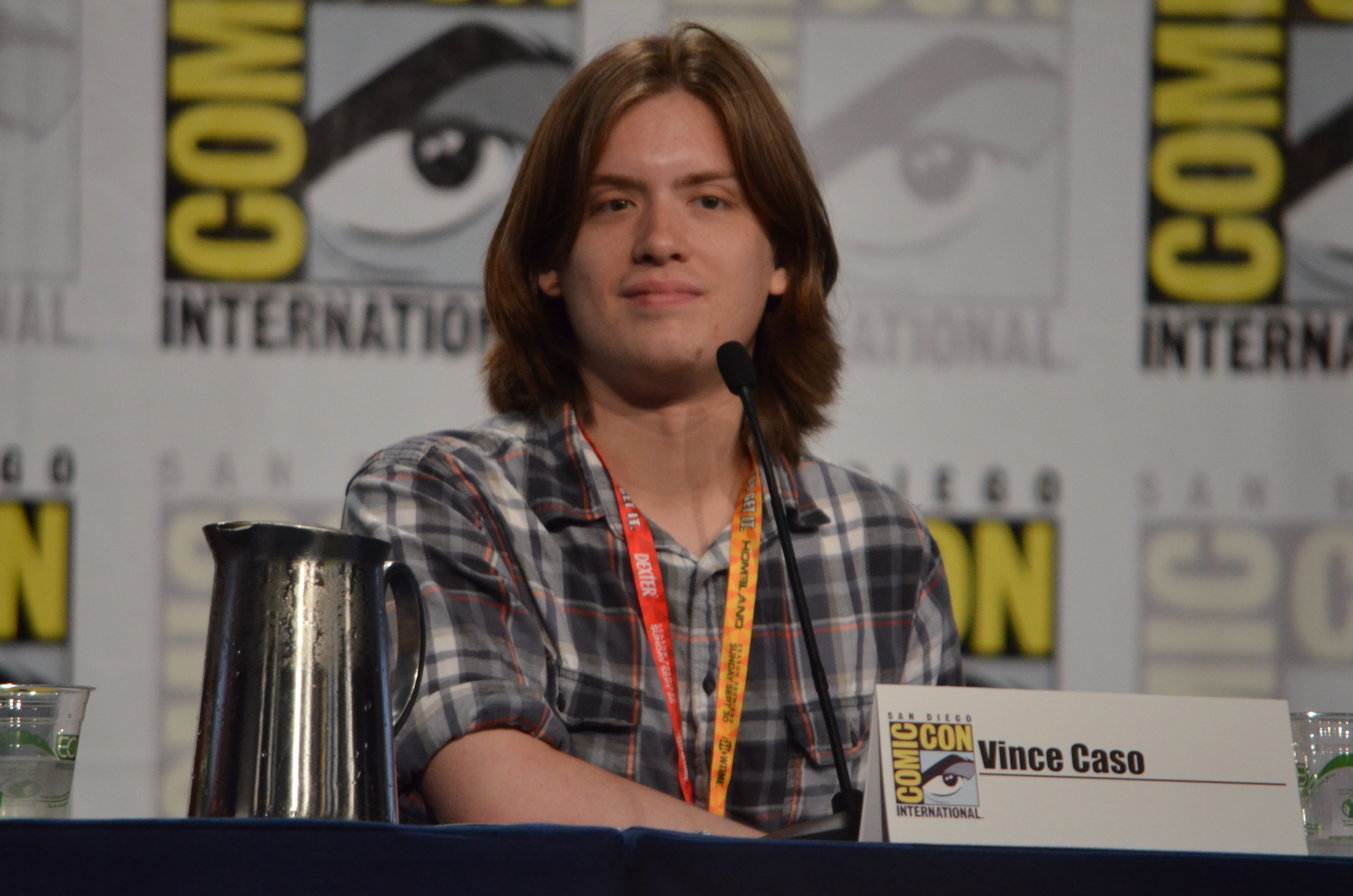
- Vincent Caso at San Diego Comic-Con in 2012
- Born: December 24, 1991 (age 34); Weymouth, Massachusetts U.S.

Vincent "Vince" Caso (born December 24, 1991) is an American actor and writer who co-starred as Bladezz on The Guild web series.

== Background ==
Vincent Caso was born in Weymouth, Massachusetts, but he was raised in Los Angeles, California where he attended a school for the Arts. At the age of thirteen, he decided to go into acting, and within a year, he landed a role in his first feature film, American Fork, a comedy produced by Jeremy Coon of Napoleon Dynamite. The film premiered at Slamdance in January 2007, garnering Caso some good reviews, as well as his first red carpet experience alongside fellow cast members Billy Baldwin, Kathleen Quinlan and writer/star Hubbel Palmer. American Fork was released in a limited number of theaters in fall of 2009 under the new name Humble Pie. He has attended classes in drama, improvisation and Shakespearean performance since his early teens, as well as performing in a variety of stage productions, such as Shakespeare's The Tempest, and several improv shows.

== Career ==
Caso portrays Bladezz in the web series The Guild, which premiered in the summer of 2007. In the series, Bladezz has a little sister Dena, who is played by Caso's real-life sister Tara Caso.

Caso has made appearances at comic and gaming conventions, such as BlizzCon and Comic-Con. He also makes occasional appearances at the Magic Castle.

Caso co-founded two acting schools with his father, actor Bob Caso. The Actor's Group Orlando in Ocoee, Florida, and Innovative Actor's Studio in Los Angeles, California.

== Filmography as an actor ==
- American Fork aka Humble Pie (2007)
- The Guild (2007–2013)
- The Jeff Lewis 5 Minute Comedy Hour (2010)
- The End (2010–2011)
- Awkward Embraces (2011)
- Between Waves (2015)
- SpaceVenture (2018)
- We're Alive: Frontier (2019)
- We're Alive: Zero Hour (2019)
- LA By Night (2019–2021)
