= Keith Johnson (actor) =

American actor (born 1953)

- Born: February 19, 1953 (age 72); Washington, D.C., U.S.
- Occupation(s): Stage, film, television actor

Keith N. Johnson (born February 19, 1953) is an American actor best known for his performances at the Arena Stage in Washington D.C. and for his small roles in films such as Major League II and Homicide.

== Early life ==
Though he was born in Washington, D.C., Johnson spent his childhood in Blythewood, South Carolina.

== Career ==
On television, Johnson appeared in two episodes of Homicide: Life on the Street from 1993 to 1995.

Johnson earned critical acclaim for his performances in the theatrical productions such as The Piano Lesson, Fences, Driving Miss Daisy, and the world premiere of Zora Neale Hurston's Polk County and for his participation in musical plays with such artists as Olu Dara, Diane McIntyre, and Trazana Beverly. He played Willie Brown in a musical production of Blues Journey at the John F. Kennedy Center for the Performing Arts. In August Wilson's Fences he played Gabriel to Bill Cobbs' Troy.

== Filmography ==
=== Film ===
| Year | Title | Role | Notes |
|---|---|---|---|
| 1986 | Good to Go | Parking Lot Attendant | |
| 1988 | Clara's Heart | Farley | Uncredited |
| 1991 | Homicide | Captain's Driver | |
| 1994 | Major League II | Vaughn's Valet | |
| 1994 | Crooklyn | Cornell | |
| 2015 | Song for Someone | Prison guard #2 | Music video |

=== Television ===
| Year | Title | Role | Notes |
|---|---|---|---|
| 1993, 1994 | Homicide: Life on the Street | Uniform Officer #1 | 2 episodes |
| 2004 | The Wire | Desk Sergeant | Episode: "Slapstick" |
