= The Guild (web series) =

American comedy web series by Felicia Day

- Genre: Comedy
- Created by: Felicia Day
- Starring: Felicia Day; Vincent Caso; Jeff Lewis; Amy Okuda; Sandeep Parikh; Robin Thorsen
- Composer: Don Schiff
- Country of origin: United States
- Original language: English
- No. of seasons: 6
- No. of episodes: 70 (list of episodes)

Production
- Producers: Felicia Day; Kim Evey; Jane Selle Morgan
- Production location: Los Angeles, California
- Running time: 3–12 minutes

Original release
- Network: YouTube; MSN Video; Xbox Live Marketplace; Zune Marketplace
- Release: July 27, 2007 – January 8, 2013

The Guild is an American comedy web series created and written by Felicia Day, who also stars as Cyd Sherman (AKA Codex). It premiered on July 27, 2007, and ran until 2013. The show revolves around the lives of a gamers' online guild, The Knights of Good, who play countless hours of a fantasy MMORPG video game referred to as The Game. The story focuses on Codex, the guild's healer, who attempts to work on her gaming addiction.

During The Guild's first season, episodes were uploaded to YouTube and the series website. Then, The Guild entered a partnership with Microsoft and episodes of the second through fifth seasons premiered on Xbox Live Marketplace, Zune Marketplace, and MSN Video before being later made available on the official Guild website, YouTube, and iTunes. Microsoft's business model changed after season five; Day wanted to keep ownership, so the episode premieres moved to Day's YouTube channel Geek & Sundry. The series is also available via DVD and streaming on Apple TV. In 2013, after the end of the sixth season, Day confirmed that the web series was complete.

Since its release, The Guild has received several accolades, including six Streamy Awards and four IAWTV Awards.

== History ==
The Guild was written and created by Felicia Day, an avid gamer, in between acting roles in other television shows and movies. After two years of gaming, Day decided to make something productive from her experiences and wrote a sitcom television pilot. The plot was purposely kept generic to avoid copyright problems and to appeal to fans of a wider audience of massively multiplayer online role-playing game (MMORPG), but Day based it on her personal experience with a World of Warcraft addiction.

Day wrote a cast of characters with diverse backstories and lives to reflect real-life gamers and subvert stereotypical depictions of gamers as lonely men. She produced the series online with Jane Selle Morgan and Kim Evey. Day already knew Sandeep Parikh and Jeff Lewis from Empty Stage Comedy Theatre, a comedy theater in Los Angeles and roles were written for them. The rest of the cast was filled through auditions. After filming the first three episodes in two and a half days, production ran out of money. After soliciting donations through PayPal, the fourth and fifth episodes were almost solely financed by donations.

== Format ==
Each episode opens with Codex (Felicia Day) recapping the previous events in the story in the form of a video blog. Usually it gives the audience a recap of the previous episode and shares Codex's feelings on the subject. The video blogs are usually reflective and interspersed with flashbacks, though some blogs take place in the timeline with other characters or situations interrupting Codex. Each season is divided into 12 episodes (with the exception of season 1, which is divided into 10 episodes).

== Plot ==
=== Season 1 (2007–2008) ===
Cyd Sherman struggles to limit her time online, where she games as her alter ego Codex, a member of the Knights of Good. After the guild realizes that Zaboo has been offline for 39 hours, he appears on Codex's doorstep. Zaboo misunderstood Codex's in-game chats as flirting and turned into a stalker living in the same apartment. On the in-game side, trouble also arises when Bladezz is banned from the game for using a macro (to spam homophobic slurs "a few thousand times") in the trade house. Codex uses this as an excuse to have the guild help her with her Zaboo problem. The guild (except Bladezz) reluctantly meets up in person—for the first time—at Cheesybeards, a local restaurant, only to find out that Vork had transferred all of their in-game valuables to Bladezz's account as part of a team building strategy. If they decided to kick out Bladezz, they would lose everything.

Things get worse when Bladezz begins to slander the Knights of Good by showing inappropriate videos of the members' characters, and Codex is no closer to getting Zaboo to go home. Then, Zaboo's home comes to him in the form of his overbearing mother. Zaboo confesses that his mother controls every aspect of his life besides the Internet, which she is beginning to read about. He saw this as his only escape.

Codex comes up with a plan to bring Bladezz down, using Zaboo's stalking skills. Zaboo finds out about Bladezz's modelling career and blackmails him into giving the gold and equipment back to the Guild. The Guild then fights off Zaboo's mom, and Bladezz redeems himself by landing the final blow. Codex soon realizes that she got Zaboo's mother's loot: Zaboo himself.

=== Season 2 (2008–2009) ===
Zaboo's mother takes revenge for losing Zaboo by having Codex evicted. Codex and Zaboo move into a new apartment, where Codex meets a new love interest: Wade (Fernando Chien), a stunt performer. Codex tries to get Zaboo to move out by telling him that he needs to level up before they can be together. She arranges for him to live with Vork, who will take in-game gold as rent, something Zaboo is really good at: gold farming. Codex focuses on trying to get Wade interested in her.

The Guild finds a valuable in-game orb which Clara and Tink fight over. Just as Vork lets it go up for bid, Clara's children unplug her computer from the Internet and, upon re-connecting, Clara finds out Tink won it. Clara vows revenge on Vork for giving it to Tink and spends an entire weekend betraying Vork by corpse camping him on an alternate account as well as searching for her own orb. Bladezz believes Tink is romantically interested in him and begins to max out his mother's credit cards to buy her stuff, when, in fact, Tink is using him to get what she wants. Vork is annoyed with Zaboo's lack of logic and his antics in trying to 'man-up' for Codex. Codex finds out that the stunt-man has a "stupid tall hot girlfriend," Riley (Michele Boyd).

The Game announces that the online play will be shut down for maintenance for four hours, during which Vork plans a strategy lecture for Zaboo and Bladezz, while Codex plans a quiet party with Clara and Tink. Bladezz coerces Vork to abandon the lecture in favor of a poker game (offline), hoping to make up some of what he spent on Tink. Clara advertises Codex's party and it becomes a crowded kegger.

Among Clara's random invitees, Wade and Riley come to the party. After finding out that Riley is Wade's roommate and Wade is single, Tink and Clara try to hook Codex up with him. Zaboo, learning of this, persuades Vork and Bladezz to go to Codex's party to try to stop it. Vork discovers that Clara has been attacking him, and begins to question his quality of leadership. Bladezz confronts Tink about their relationship; upon learning that he has been used, Bladezz steals Tink's laptop and deletes her character. Meanwhile, Zaboo walks in on Wade and Codex kissing and challenges Wade to a fight. Wade is a much better fighter, but Zaboo's seriousness about Codex leads to Wade giving up his interest in her. Codex yells at Zaboo that she doesn't like him, and he leaves dejected. Then Codex sees a drunken Clara kissing with Wade, and decides to chase after Zaboo to apologize, but is hurt when she sees him making out with Riley.

=== Season 3 (2009) ===
Codex was able to recover from the disastrous party by the announcement of the new expansion pack for the game, Spires of Dragonor. The Knights of Good are first in line at GameStop until a rival guild, the Axis of Anarchy, cuts in front of them. After the Axis tricks a GameStop worker into sending the Knights to the back of line, Vork, still not over the events of the party, resigns as Guild Leader. Codex is elected as his successor, causing Tink to leave the Knights and join the Axis.

While Vork goes on a self-discovery journey, Clara's husband George demands that she spend more time with the family after discovering her gaming has severely distanced her from him. As a result, Clara proposes that he take Tink's place after auditions for a sixth member fail. Riley, who becomes increasingly domineering to Zaboo, offers to join, but Codex chooses Clara's husband instead, adding "Mr. Wiggly" to the Guild. Meanwhile, Bladezz begins to be targeted by Tink and the Axis of Anarchy, who expose his modelling alias to his school and plant weapons in his locker; later, Bruiser (J. Teddy Garcia), a member of the Anarchists, seduces his mom. Codex issues a message on the game's public forum to stand up against the Axis for the behavior, and in retaliation the Axis puts a bounty on the Guild. Mr. Wiggly unknowingly gives away information about the Guild to other gamers in exchange for loot, which leads to his expulsion from the Guild. With this, he tells Clara to quit the game, and she does to save her marriage.

Codex and Zaboo track down the Anarchist Valkyrie at his job in an attempt to end the Axis' harassment of Bladezz, where is he playing the game on company time. After taking away some of his character's possessions and threatening to expose him, Valkyrie tells them where and when the next Axis of Anarchy meeting will take place. Vork returns after regaining his confidence to lead and, with Codex, reassembles the Guild to challenge the Axis at an internet cafe where they planned to have a group raid. The battle begins, but both sides lose members quickly. Some of the Knights die in-game when their real-life problems manifest: Clara's husband shows up, angry that she is playing the game; Riley destroys Zaboo's computer for not meeting her demands. Clara tells her husband that they are going to have another child and he forgets about their argument and redeems himself in the eyes of the guild by helping Clara kill the Anarchist Kwan in game. Zaboo breaks up with Riley, who then proceeds to make out with Venom.

Finally, only Codex is left to face off Tink and Axis leader Fawkes (Wil Wheaton). After Codex makes Bladezz apologize to Tink, Tink decides that the Axis members are even bigger jerks than she can stand and lets Codex kill her in-game. Codex, in a hallucinatory conversation with her game character, musters the courage to defeat Fawkes. The Knights welcome Tink back into the guild, and Bladezz makes tentative peace with the Axis member who seduced his mother. Fawkes invites Codex for drinks; she initially refuses but, in a twist ending, wakes up in bed with him the next morning.

=== Season 4 (2010) ===
An unexpected and unintentional one-night stand with Fawkes (Wheaton) causes Codex to stress over what the guild thinks of her and persuades him to cover for her in a pretend relationship. But after spending more time together, Codex realizes he is a "total tool-bag" and reevaluates her criteria for relationships with men. Her computer breaks and she is forced to get a job at Cheesybeards to pay for repairs but has no idea how to fulfil the expectations of her boss, Ollie (Frank Ashmore).

Zaboo tries to be a good friend to Codex during her fake relationship with Fawkes instead of trying to win her love. He dives into this new pursuit with his usual smothering intensity. When the truth of the relationship is revealed he realizes that his feelings for Codex have changed and he wants to be her friend. An earnings competition for a new guild hall sparks a real-life business for Tink and Clara which strengthens and strains their friendship. Vork enlists Zaboo's mother, Avinashi (Viji Nathan), for her "brilliant economic mind" in his pursuit of his vision for the guild's hall and he sets up a stock market and loan company that is bankrupting players. However, her smothering tendencies enrage him to the point that he "make[s] a giant gesture that's really inappropriate" and proposes marriage in an attempt to repulse her. To his horror she accepts. Codex and Bladezz film an online Cheesybeards commercial but the result is so horrible that it spawns a series of prank calls to the establishment. Ollie is furious and fires Codex. The guild helps Codex get her job back by organizing a celebration at Cheesybeards which attracts a large population of gamers. Bladezz attempts to perform a magic trick involving fire, which ends up torching the restaurant (costing Codex and Bladezz their jobs).

Zaboo begs Codex to intercede in the upcoming nuptials between his mother and Vork. And when Zaboo reveals he has used the money from auctioning a romantic painting of Codex and Fawkes he had commissioned to buy her a new computer she is touched by the gesture and resolves to break up the wedding. Avinashi and Vork are about to speak their vows to each other, at a virtual wedding ceremony in the newly purchased prison-like Knights of Good guild hall, when all of the guild members object. Codex manages to convince Zaboo's mother that it is wrong to marry "someone [she] can't stand in order to be close to someone who doesn't want to be near [her]". Zaboo helps by suggesting that she visit every few weeks when she gets lonely, causing Codex to realize that he possesses all the qualities on her new litmus test, and considers a relationship with him.

The season wraps up with an official gamemaster crashing the ceremony to put an end to Vork's "Trogothian Stock Market" scheme. Codex convinces the GM, Kevinator (Simon Helberg), to change the design of the guild hall to the "bitchin' fairy palace" that Tink and Clara wanted. Kevinator is impressed to meet Bladezz, who has become an internet celebrity and invites the whole guild to a gaming convention.

=== Season 5 (2011) ===
The Knights of Good travel to MegaGameORama-Con, a three-day gaming convention. Bladezz believes that he is invited by Kevinator as a special guest, but his name is not on the invite list. With all nearby hotels booked, Rachel, a member of the convention staff, manages to secure a room for them. However, it is not offered for free, and Bladezz convinces the rest of the guild that he will clarify the situation to Kevinator. Meanwhile, Codex is more interested in getting close to Zaboo, but he becomes engrossed in attending the events and panels.

On the first day of the convention, Bladezz and Vork discover that Kevinator had been fired from The Game before the day of the convention and Bladezz was one of his joke invites. To compensate for hotel fees, both of them start up a photo booth for the Cheeseybeard's pirate. Tink attempts to sell the T-shirts she and Clara made but is forced to find a booth to avoid from being caught by the convention staff for selling without a permit. When she and Clara come upon a steampunk-themed booth, Clara is more interested in it than selling the shirts. Zaboo is denied entry to a panel because the seats are full, causing him to form a seat-saving network. Codex tries out the new demo at The Game's booth, but unknowingly insults the creator, Floyd Petrovski (Ted Michaels). She becomes even more preoccupied when Zaboo spurns her advances and is continuously stalked by a convention-goer in a furry costume. When she follows Floyd to apologize, she discovers that he plans to sell The Game to a mainstream market. Codex becomes concerned about the future of the game, which is the only thing in her life holding her friendships together.

Tink, who continuously changes costumes to hide her identity, reveals to Codex at a party that she is hiding from her adoptive family, who have attended the convention, fearing that they will discover her switching majors from pre-med to fashion design. Codex arranges a dinner with her family to reconcile against Tink's will. Meanwhile, Clara tries to join the steampunk group and is trained as their fourth member to help them win the costume contest, but the members of the group ultimately turn her away. Zaboo has become so preoccupied with his seat-saving network that he briefly goes power-hungry. He is stopped by Clara, who brings back his old personality, ending his involvement with the seat-saving network.

Bladezz and Vork's booth becomes successful, but Vork rejects all of the celebrities who want to spend time with Bladezz. His attention, however, is turned towards Madeline (Erin Gray), an actress who played his favorite character, Charity, on the show Time Rings. The two are invited to a party that night, but Bladezz realizes that all the celebrities lead normal lives, finding them boring. Still, he rejects Rachel and her friends for the celebrities and openly humiliates them. Vork, on the other hand, ends up offending Madeline after he criticizes her decision to leave her show.

The next day, Bladezz has lost all support from the celebrities and his fans, so he is unable to continue the Cheeseybeard pirate's photo booth. Zaboo helps Clara build a steampunk-themed blimp to help her win the costume contest. Codex and Tink discover that Codex's stalker is Fawkes, who wants to join their guild after the Axis of Anarchy broke up, but Codex rejects him. The girls later eavesdrop on Floyd's conversation and discover he plans on revealing his decision at the costume contest that night. Both of them convince the rest of the Guild to help them save The Game from going "freemium". The Guild is able to stop the changes with much success: Clara wins the costume contest, Bladezz is able to win back his fans, and Vork reconciles with Madeline. As all of them leave the convention the next morning, Floyd has decided to give Codex a job.

=== Season 6 (2012–2013) ===
Codex begins her new job working for Floyd Petrovski at the headquarters for "The Game", only to discover that he's a thoughtless tyrant who immediately turns all the other employees against her. Meanwhile, Tink discovers that the men she manipulated for services and gifts have all slandered her on local websites, losing all of her connections. Bladezz gets kicked out of his house by Bruiser and spends time at Clara's, convincing her long-suffering husband that she is devoted to her children by uploading videos of her parenting to the Internet, though he is more interested in monetizing the videos. Vork, who is dating Madeline, becomes disillusioned when Zaboo uncovers photos of her protesting nude, while Zaboo suffers separation anxiety from the members of the Guild going offline, seeking refuge from a collage of his ideal "sweetheart."

Codex is pressured by her co-workers to convince Floyd to release the underwater expansion pack they have been planning for months but is forced to do menial chores in order to appease him. When the Guild visits her workplace, Tink steals Codex's key to the testing server and initiates a casual relationship with Donovan (Corey Craig), where they agree that he will do chores for her if she spends time with him. Unbeknownst to her, she begins to fall in love with him for real. Zaboo, who enters the server posing as an IT technician, becomes smitten with Sabina (Justine Ezarik), an NPC of The Game and the spitting image of his ideal girl.

Vork, who has gotten through with an argument with Madeline about his personal goals, confronts Floyd about his unanswered complaints about The Game. That gets his character permanently banned, and he retaliates by protesting and gaining support from other gamers. Meanwhile, Bladezz is forced to spend time with Wiggly while Clara continues making videos. When Clara becomes Internet-famous, other parents turn to her for advice, one of them being Bladezz's mother. Clara encourages her to keep dating Bruiser, causing Bladezz to convince Wiggly to quit his job.

The underwater expansion patch notes are leaked onto the Internet, greatly intensifying the protest. Codex is unsuccessful in finding the culprit but convinces Floyd to release the expansion pack anyway. Donovan reveals to Tink that he was the one who caused the leak in order to push Floyd to release the expansion pack, and Tink tells him that Codex and Vork are in the same guild. He uses this information against Floyd to blame the leak on Codex and gets her fired. Vork's protest culminates in a riot, but his acts have renewed Madeline's faith in him and the two reconcile.

As her final act for Floyd, Codex quells the rioters by questioning their acts and informing that their poor attitudes contributed to the problems at the Game HQ. Floyd unexpectedly steps out and challenges the crowd to insult him to his face instead of typing online insults, but the entire crowd congratulate him on his work and cite their insecurities as part of their bad behaviors. Inspired, Floyd announces a troll-themed add-on for the Game. By the end of the day, Clara is successful in convincing Bruiser to break up with Bladezz's mother and secures a position at a vlogging network, Tink and Donovan begin a relationship, and Zaboo discovers his real-life Sabina. Codex, happy with getting her job back and realizing how much her friends are loyal to her, makes a final vlog and tearily shuts down her computer, bringing the season (and the series) to a close.

== Characters and cast ==
=== Knights of Good ===
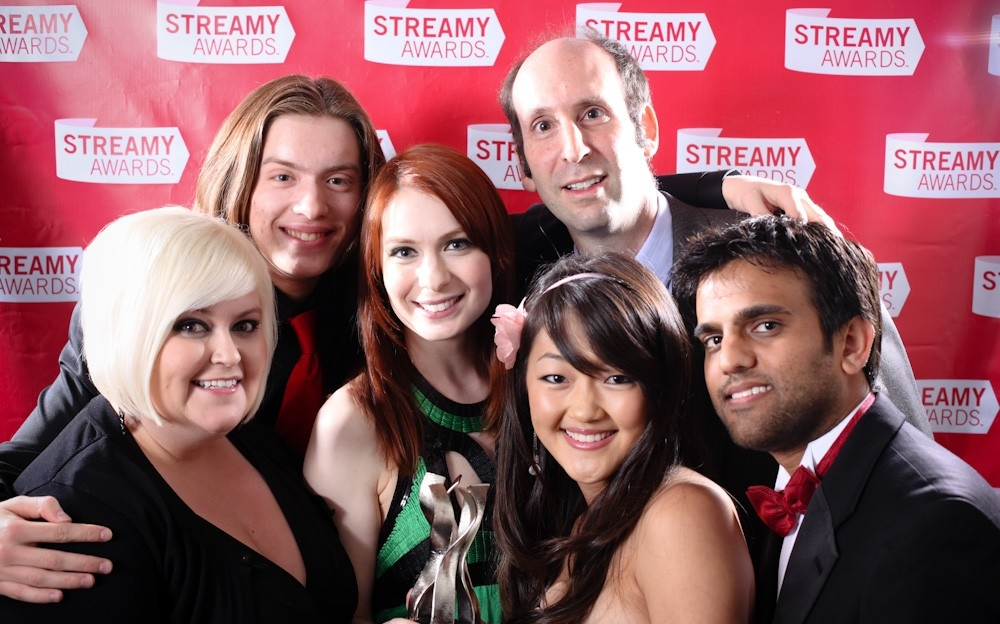
- The cast of The Guild at the 2009 Streamy Awards
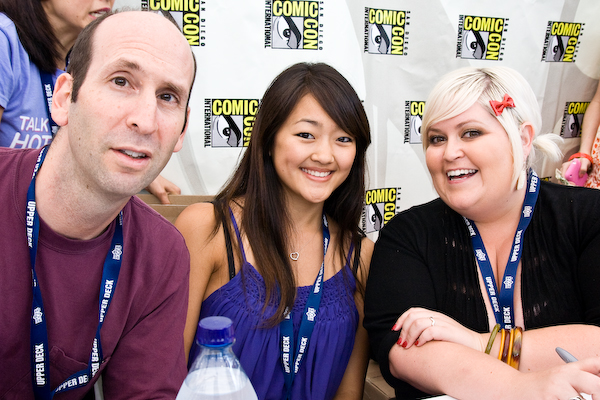
  Lewis (Vork), Okuda (Tinkerballa), and Thorsen (Clara)
  Codex (real name Cyd Sherman) is the Priest. Codex is shy and non-confrontational, tending to panic under stress. Outside the game she is a concert violinist (and former child prodigy), unemployed after setting fire to her boyfriend's cello. She is an addicted gamer who tries at first to control the time she spends online, but fails. For that reason, her therapist drops her. At the beginning of the series she is quite reclusive with no real-life friends; she is often self-conscious and awkward around men. Codex is portrayed by creator Felicia Day.
- Zaboo (real name Sujan Balakrishnan Goldberg) is the Warlock. Zaboo says he is a "HinJew", having a Hindu mother and Jewish father. He shows great skill with computers; for example, his stalking of Codex included obtaining (presumably through the Internet) the floor plan of her apartment and all her past residences. His obsessive attitude toward Codex reflects his mother's smothering. When talking, Zaboo often uses "-'d" after some key word or expression, self-commenting on what he just said (e.g. bladder'd, testosterone'd). While Zaboo doesn't appear to have a profession, he admits having attended college for four years (to which his mother drove him every day). Zaboo is portrayed by Sandeep Parikh.
- Vork (real name Herman Holden) is the guild leader and Warrior. He enjoys managing the guild and budgeting, and believes only in rules and logic. He lives frugally (and illegally) on his late grandfather's Social Security checks and is a certified notary public. When he became Guild Leader he "cut the fats of life" including electric power; he steals his senile neighbor's wifi (and shed), and keeps his food cold by buying ice with food stamps. In the penultimate episode of season 3 he reveals that he can speak fluent Korean; in season 4, he speaks Hindi to Zaboo's mother and claims to know all languages. Vork comes to believe that shared hatred of him is what keeps the guild together. In Season 4, his desire to own a guild hall leads him to manipulating an in-game exchange market, nearly causing him to be banned from the game. Vork is portrayed by Jeff Lewis.
- Bladezz (real name Simon Kemplar) is the Rogue. He is a high school student who spends most of his time outside of school in his mom's garage playing the Game. He is rude to the other male guild members, hits on the female guild members, and often makes lewd sexual jokes and comments. He is shown to be trumped by his tomboyish little sister many times throughout the series. He is worried about being sent to military school, and to save up for college his mom forced him into modeling; using the alias "Finn Smulders" in order to keep it a secret from his fellow high school students. In seasons 4 and 5, he becomes an Internet meme. Bladezz is portrayed by Vincent Caso.
- Clara (real name Clara Beane) is the Frost Mage. Clara is a neglectful stay-at-home wife and mother, college partier, and ex-cheerleader. Her three children are all young, with the youngest still breastfeeding. Though proud of her children, she tends to put gaming before her family, and sometimes tries to mix the two, recruiting her husband "Mr. Wiggly" to the guild. She uses her real name as her avatar name because her kids saw her old name, "Mom-inatrix". Clara expresses a ditsy, scatter brained, and eccentric personality with occasional bursts of insight. In the Season 5, Clara proves herself to be a capable mother -figure when she stops Zaboo from going mad with power and lack of sleep. Clara is portrayed by Robin Thorsen.
- Tinkerballa (real name April Lou) is the Ranger. Tink distances herself from the guild, trying not to let them know anything about her personal life, she even keeps her real name a secret from her fellow guildies introducing herself as Tinkerballa. Her real name isn't revealed until the fifth season. In reality, Tink is adopted and has two caucasian sisters. She also has been lying to her parents about being a pre-med student, when she has actually switched courses for a degree in costume design. She is shown to have a huge video game addiction, always having an alternate game in hand when not playing the guild's game, even when raiding. She is cold, manipulative, and uses men to get what she wants including Bladezz who deletes Tink's character to avenge himself after being used by Tink. After that and Vork's refusal to punish Bladezz, she leaves the Knights of Good and joins the Axis of Anarchy, but later finds them too "douchey" even for her (she even says that she went on a date with Fawkes to join). She rejoins the Knights of Good during an in-game showdown with the Axis of Anarchy when they call her "Tainterballa" and she allows her avatar to be killed off intentionally to give Codex the shot at victory for the guild. Tink is revealed to be possibly the most social of the group although is incredibly grounded in the online world. In Season 5, Codex reunites Tink with her family at the gaming con. Tink is portrayed by Amy Okuda.

==== Temporary members ====
- Mr. Wiggly (real name George Beane) is a Hunter. He is Clara's husband, nominated by Clara to replace Tink in Season 3; Codex hastily accepts him in order to prevent Zaboo from recruiting Riley. He is clearly inexperienced in gaming, mentioning that the last game he played was Pong (which Bladezz was unfamiliar with). Mr. Wiggly wants to spend time with Clara, but is at his wits' end with her distraction and infidelity. George is shown to be a conventional man who has a sense of responsibility, helping Clara when she spontaneously starts a gamer company. He is displeased when Clara leaves unannounced for the gaming con. Mr. Wiggly is played by Brett Sheridan.

=== Axis of Anarchy ===
- Fawkes is the leader of the Axis of Anarchy. He always wears a black kilt and often wears a black "Axis of Anarchy" T-shirt. In person he speaks with a cool, calm, almost polite tone, though he is prone to angered outbursts when online. He seems to be quite educated as well, as he is constantly quoting philosophers, authors, or figures of history. He often demonstrates that he does not believe in following rules, unless it benefits him. Because of their top ranking, he expects constant perfection from his guild. He is also quite full of himself and manipulative, convincing people they are into him. After the Knights of Good defeat the Axis of Anarchy at the end of Season 3, Fawkes invites Codex for drinks and although she doesn't intend to go, she does and ends up having a one-night stand with him. Attempting to justify this to herself and the Guild, she tries seeing where a relationship with Fawkes would go but he claims he is uninterested in dating and eventually she dumps him. However it emerges that Fawkes has developed feelings for Codex and asks her out properly, but she turns him down flatly. He returns in Season 5, revealing that the Axis broke up (claiming no fault of his own). Fawkes is played by Wil Wheaton.
- Venom is the only woman in her guild, until Tink joins. She is a paraplegic and uses a wheelchair, but seems to have no problem exploiting her disability for personal gain. She has a violent attitude and seems to dislike her guildmates. On at least two occasions she threatens suicide to get her way, and, when her character is killed in-game, feels ecstasy at this vicarious death. She works as a substitute art teacher at Bladezz's high school. Played by Teal Sherer.
- Bruiser is the guild's healer, and a corrupt police officer. Bruiser is probably the largest, loudest, and most vulgar member of the Axis. He had sex with Bladezz's mother to torment Bladezz, and in Season 6 is continuing to see her. Played by J. Teddy Garces.
- Kwan is a champion StarCraft player and earns millions playing in South Korea. He only speaks Korean and has a female assistant named Nik (played by Toni Lee) who massages his hands and translates for him. He seems to be able to understand some English, and it's possible that Fawkes can understand some of what he says (as his translator does not translate what Kwan says into English). Played by Alexander Yi.
- Valkyrie (alt-character Artemis) is the attempted joker of the guild, though his jokes seem to be funny only to himself. Based on dialogue with his off-screen boss, he works for some form of design or decorating firm – he claimed to be dealing with a client whose damask came in the wrong color. He also has web skills, claiming to be the one who created finnsmulders.com. He also plays two girl characters because he claims to like looking at girls, although it is strongly implied he might be a closet homosexual. Played by Mike Rose.

=== Game HQ ===
- Floyd Petrovski is the creator of the Game and head of the company that produces it. While at Megagame-o-ramacon Floyd overhears Codex criticize parts of the upgrades available for playtest at the convention. After Codex apologizes for her comments and gathers the guild together to interfere with the Game's sale to a larger company, Floyd recognizes Codex's passion for the Game, and hires her as an assistant. Floyd proves to be a difficult boss, quickly alienating Codex from much of the staff. Floyd is played by Ted Michaels.
- Roy Aquino (Derek Basco), the graphic designer of the Game. On Codex's first day, Floyd lets her have Roy's office without his permission, causing Roy to dislike Codex from the very start. He subtly harasses Codex with drawings and bulletins. He is shown to have a stutter when under stress.
- Theodora (Alexandra Hoover), the Game COO and head producer. Despite being austere and cold-hearted, she is also extremely clumsy and tends to cover this up with awkward recoveries.
- Sula Morrison (Sujata Day), the hyperactive community coordinator. She wears glasses despite not having any vision impairment, claiming they make her appear smarter.
- Donovan (Corey Craig), the lead programmer and nephew to Floyd. Despite being handsome and athletic, he avoids people most of the time; Floyd calls him a savant and Tink questions whether he has Asperger's Syndrome or not. Tink, nonetheless, gets him into doing her homework and yet develops feelings for him. He graduated top of his class from Caltech in Pasadena, California.

=== Other characters ===
- Zaboo's mother (Avinashi Goldberg) epitomizes the over-controlling mother. She had Zaboo microchipped to keep track of his movements, punches Codex for (in her belief) trying to take her son away from her, manipulates him through a series of probably false ailments, and gets Codex evicted for helping him break free of her. She returns in Season 4, attempting to develop a real relationship with her son and ends up assisting Vork in earning gold to purchase a deluxe guild hall. She does manage to reconcile with Zaboo. She is played by Viji Nathan.
- Dena is Bladezz' precocious little sister. She is first seen when she arrives at the table at Cheesybeards, just after Bladezz has informed the Guildies that he is in control of all the Guild gold and equipment, ruining his big exit. Dena often practices playing bass guitar in Bladezz' basement, to his annoyance, and reads Sun Tzu's The Art of War (along with building Civil War dioramas). In Season 4, she trained Bladezz in being an actor (calling him terrible). Dena is played by Tara Caso, the sister of Vincent Caso who plays Bladezz.
- Wade Wei is Codex's attractive neighbor and brief love interest. Not a gamer himself, Wade works as a martial arts stunt double; on first meeting Codex, he bumps into her and falls down some stairs, practicing a new stunt. He's fond of showing off his moves and flirting with Codex, making her extremely nervous. Having a queasy stomach, Codex vomits on him upon seeing him in makeup from a zombie movie he is playing in. He harbors a revulsion for gamers, expressing his desire to punch them. Ironically, he describes Codex's gaming-derived knowledge of weaponry as "sexy," though it is worth noting that she does not explain how she knows so much about weapons when he makes the compliment. In episode 10 of season 2, it was revealed that he did motion capture stunt work for the Game. Wade is played by Fernando Chien.
- Riley is Wade's roommate with benefits and temporarily dated Zaboo. Riley is an FPS gamer and is ranked in Halo on Xbox Live. Riley is very dominant and enjoys submissive underdogs like Zaboo, and later Codex. At first she was thrilled to meet Codex, another girl gamer, until after she learned that Codex was an MMORPG player, the two began a grudging rivalry. This parodies the normal relationship between MOG and MMORPG players. In the finale of Season 3, Riley straddles Venom and starts making out with her to get back at Zaboo for breaking up with her. Riley and Venom then start a relationship, which goes well into Season 4 Episode 10, where they're seen discussing Wench outfits. The character of Riley is based on Team Unicorn member, Rileah Vanderbilt, and played by Team Unicorn member Michele Boyd.
- Ollie is the manager of Cheesybeards. He runs his restaurant in a very casual style, allowing Bladezz to use a computer while working at the grill. He speaks entirely in pirate-slang and uses a hook on his left hand (which is hinted to be real). Ollie is responsible for Codex getting a job at the restaurant, after she says she can improve advertising and increase business (though Bladezz sabotages these efforts). Ollie is slightly at odds with Jeannete, who strongly disapproves of Bladezz's slacker work ethic. He first appeared in episode 3 of season 4 and is played by Frank Ashmore.
- Jeanette is Bladezz's superior at Cheesybeards. She is fed up with his horrible work ethic, but is at odds with Ollie (who is okay with Bladezz). At the end of Season 4, it is revealed she was one of Fawkes' one-night stands and proceeds to beat him up (as she knows mixed martial arts). Jeanette was the first new character to appear in Season 4 and was played by Tymberlee Hill.
- Kevinator is the official gamemaster of the Game who appears at the end of Season 4 to undo Vork ruining the in game economy by hoarding craft items and selling them for massively inflated prices. Kevinator displays a high level of narcissism over his role, proclaiming ‘I am a god!’ before shooting lightning bolts around while giggling manically. After recognizing Bladezz from the Cheesy Beards commercial and becoming friends, he provides the Knights of Good with tickets for a gaming convention focused on The Game. However, in Season 5, it is revealed that Kevinator was fired from the game just before the convention for unfair play. In addition, the invite for Bladezz turns out to be a joke, as he has a habit of inviting internet memes for his boss. Kevinator is played by Simon Helberg.
- Rachel is one of the staff members at Megagame-o-ramacon. She is amazed with meeting Bladezz (barely able to contain her excitement when meeting him), going out of her way to help get the Guild a room. The next day, Rachel is forced to get Tink and Clara to stop selling their shirts (with the help of stormtroopers). After being stood up by Bladezz she and her friends harass him by picketing and wrecking his booth at the convention, though Bladezz does manage to apologize later. She is played by Hayley Holmes.
- Madeline Twain is a guest of Megagame-o-ramacon, an actress regarded as legendary among the fans of the convention. The former heroine of the long ago canceled science fiction television series "Time Rings", Madeline serves as mistress of ceremonies at the con's costume contest. Vork, revealed as a former head of the star's fan club, is still smitten with her, though somewhat resentful about her abrupt exit from the series. In Season 6, Vork and Madeline begin dating. Madeline is played by Erin Gray.

== Reception ==
The Guild had over 69 million upload views on YouTube as of September 2011. The series won several awards since its launch, including six Streamy Awards and four IAWTV Awards and in February 2009, Rolling Stone named it one of "The Net's Best Serial Shows". A costume from the series has been accessioned by the National Museum of American History of the Smithsonian Institution in Washington, D.C..

In 2014 The Guild was listed on New Media Rockstars Top 100 Channels, ranked at #37.

=== In popular culture ===
Joss Whedon credits The Guild as being one of the inspirations for Dr. Horrible's Sing-Along Blog, which also starred Day.

== Awards and nominations ==
Over the course of its duration, The Guild has won and been nominated for several awards.

Awards and nominations for The Guild
Year	Award Show	Category	Result	Recipient(s)
2007	YouTube Video Award	Best Series	Won	
2008	South by Southwest Greenlight Award	Best Original Production	Won	
2008	Yahoo! Video Award	Best Series	Won	
2009	1st Streamy Awards	Best Comedy Web Series	Won	
2009	1st Streamy Awards	Best Male Actor in a Comedy Web Series	Nominated	Sandeep Parikh
2009	1st Streamy Awards	Best Female Actor in a Comedy Web Series	Won	Felicia Day
2009	1st Streamy Awards	Best Ensemble Cast in a Web Series	Won	
2009	1st Streamy Awards	Best Directing in a Comedy Web Series	Nominated	Sean Becker
2009	1st Streamy Awards	Best Guest Star in a Web Series	Nominated	Fernando Chien
2009	1st Streamy Awards	Best Writing for a Comedy Web Series	Nominated	Felicia Day
2009	1st Streamy Awards	Best Editing for a Web Series	Nominated	
2009	1st Streamy Awards	Audience Choice Award for Best Web Series	Won	
2009	1st Streamy Awards	Best Art Direction in a Web Series	Nominated	Leah Mann
2009	1st Streamy Awards	Best Visual Effects in a Web Series	Nominated	Daniel Scraggs
2009	1st Streamy Awards	Best Original Music in a Web Series	Nominated	Don Schiff
2010	2nd Streamy Awards	Best Comedy Web Series	Nominated	
2010	2nd Streamy Awards	Best Male Actor in a Comedy Web Series	Nominated	Sandeep Parikh
2010	2nd Streamy Awards	Best Female Actor in a Comedy Web Series	Won	Felicia Day
2010	2nd Streamy Awards	Best Ensemble Cast in a Web Series	Nominated	Vincent Caso, Felicia Day, Jeff Lewis, Amy Okuda, Sandeep Parikh, Robin Thorsen
2010	2nd Streamy Awards	Best Guest Star in a Web Series	Nominated	Wil Wheaton
2010	2nd Streamy Awards	Audience Choice Award for Best Web Series	Nominated	
2010	2nd Streamy Awards	Best Directing for a Comedy Web Series	Won	Sean Becker
2010	2nd Streamy Awards	Best Writing for a Comedy Web Series	Nominated	Felicia Day
2012	Inaugural IAWTV Awards	Best Comedy Web Series	Won	
2012	Inaugural IAWTV Awards	Best Writing (Comedy)	Won	Felicia Day
2012	Inaugural IAWTV Awards	Best Directing (Comedy)	Won	Sean Becker
2012	Inaugural IAWTV Awards	Best Female Performance (Comedy)	Won	Felicia Day (Codex)
2012	Inaugural IAWTV Awards	Best Male Performance (Comedy)	Nominated	Jeff Lewis (Vork)
2012	Inaugural IAWTV Awards	Best Male Performance (Comedy)	Nominated	Sandeep Parikh (Zaboo)
2012	Inaugural IAWTV Awards	Best Costume Design	Nominated	Kirstin Ingram
2012	Inaugural IAWTV Awards	Best Makeup/Special Effects	Nominated	Kimberly Graczyk
2012	Inaugural IAWTV Awards	Best Web Site Design	Won	
2013	3rd Annual Streamy Awards	Best Writing: Comedy	Nominated	Felicia Day
2013	3rd Annual Streamy Awards	Best Use of Fashion & Design	Nominated	Kristin Ingram

== In other media ==
=== Comic books ===
On March 24, 2010, the first issue of the comic book limited series based on the show was released from Dark Horse Comics. It acts as a prequel to the show, and it was written by Felicia Day and illustrated by Jim Rugg. The second issue was released on April 23, 2010, and the third and final issue was released on May 26, 2010. The collected volume was released on November 24, 2010.

A second five-issue series was released in 2011. Each issue focuses on a single character (Vork, Zaboo, Clara, Tinkerballa, and Bladezz) and is illustrated by a different artist. The collected volume, The Guild Volume 2, was released on June 27, 2012. An additional single character issue, The Guild: Fawkes, was issued on May 23, 2012, and takes place after season 4 of the web series.

=== Music videos ===
The Guild cast have appeared as their characters in three music videos to promote the series. In "(Do You Wanna Date My) Avatar", the cast appears as their game characters. The song and video were released shortly before the start of Season 3 and were used to promote the show. "Game On" is a Bollywood-themed video about Zaboo trying to convince Codex to play the game. This second video was used in a similar fashion and promoted Season 4. The third song and video titled "I'm the One That's Cool" is a pop rock song "touting the rise of nerd culture and the geek shall inherit the earth credo". It was released to promote the launch of Felicia Day's new YouTube channel Geek & Sundry. "(Do You Wanna Date My) Avatar" and "I'm the One That's Cool" are available on the Rock Band Network.

=== Musical adaptation ===
Felicia Day revealed at MCM Comic Con London in October 2023 that she was working on a stage musical adaptation of The Guild. The project, produced by Day and Tom Lenk and featuring a book by Allison Frasca, music by Mark Schenfisch, and lyrics by Sam Balzac, had its first staged reading at Dynasty Typewriter on February 23, 2025. The cast included Day reprising her role as Codex, Phil LaMarr as Vork, Kirsten Vangsness as Clara, Anjali Bhimani as Avinashi, Rama Vallury as Zaboo, Lauren Lopez as Tink, and Joey Richter as Bladezz.

A second reading took place at The Other Palace in London for four performances from February 10 to 12, 2026, as part of MTFestUK. For the performance, the show was drastically shortened from 98 minutes to an hour. Day and Bhimani reprised their roles, joined by Cavin Cornwall as Vork, Day as Codex, Iván Fernández González as Bladezz, Emma Lindars as Clara, Emily Ooi as Tink, and Nuwan Hugh Perera as Zaboo.

=== Feature Film ===
In April 2026 it was announced that a script for a reunion movie had been written, and that a crowd funding campaign would be launched on Kickstarter later in the year. The film's title was revealed as The Guild: Ren Faire'd when the campaign went live on 20th July, surpassing its target with over $2.5 million pledged within the first 24 hours. With 38 hours remaining, the campaign broke the Guinness book of world records to be the highest crowdfunding movie in history.

== Production notes ==
=== Season 1 ===
The Guild was originally intended to be a pilot episode for a TV series, but Felicia Day was advised that it would be much more suited for a web series. The show changed its format and script to fit a web series. The first episode "Wake-Up Call" premiered on YouTube on July 27, 2007. After the first three episodes, the group ran out of money; but a link to Day's PayPal brought enough donations to fund "Cheesybeards" and "Rather Be Raiding". The first season ended on May 15, 2008, consisting of 10 episodes and two specials (including the Christmas special, "Christmas Raid Carol").

The Guild season 1 DVD was released on Amazon.com on May 19, 2009. For Canadian audiences, it was bundled with season 2, released on September 29, 2009, also available on Amazon.com.

=== Season 2 ===
Filming for season 2 began in August 2008. "Link the Loot" premiered on Xbox Live Marketplace, Microsoft Zune Marketplace, and MSN Video on November 25, 2008. Season 2 ended with "Fight!" on February 17, 2009, and featured "Love During Wartime" by The Main Drag. On November 24, 2008, Microsoft announced an exclusive distribution deal with Guild creator Felicia Day. All twelve episodes of season 2 premiered on Xbox 360, Zune, and MSN, with a four-week delay for release on The Guild's official website. The Microsoft releases were free, but supported by Sprint advertisements and product placements. Creator Felicia Day retains the IP rights to the series, with Microsoft paying an "unspecified" license fee upfront. Sometime in late February 2009, when all episodes of season two had been released, Day and her team were free to sign a new nonexclusive distribution deal should they choose to do so.

The Guild season 2 DVD was released on Amazon.com on May 19, 2009, containing commentary tracks, gag reels, audition footage, and a "behind the scenes" documentary. It was also released for the Canadian audience along with season 1 on Amazon.com. Season 2 was nominated for eleven Streamy Awards and won three: Best Comedy Web Series, Best Ensemble Cast in a Web Series, and Best Female Actor in a Comedy Web Series (Felicia Day).

=== Season 3 ===
On August 17, 2009, a music video – "(Do You Wanna Date My) Avatar" by Felicia Day – was released on Xbox Live to promote season 3, which would premiere on August 25, 2009, on Xbox Live for members with Gold Accounts first. Later it was announced that it would be released for members with Silver Accounts, as well as Zune and MSN video users, on September 1, 2009. The season premiered with "Expansion Time" on August 25, 2009, and ended on November 24, 2009, with "Hero". The season featured guest star Wil Wheaton as the leader of a rival guild out to destroy the Knights of Good.

=== Season 4 ===
In April 2010, The Guild's official website announced the show was renewed by Microsoft for a fourth season. On June 9, 2010, the official recap of season 3—an Auto-Tuned music video by The Gregory Brothers—was posted on Bing; the video included a message that season 4 would begin on July 13, 2010.

On July 27, 2010, a second music video, called "Game On", was posted to promote season 4. On September 14, 2010, another promotional video was posted of the Cheesybeard's full commercial. Michael Chaves, director of The Curse of La Llorona, served as a visual effects artist for season 4.

=== Season 5 ===
Season 5 was at the gaming convention mentioned at the end of season 4 and shooting began on April 21, 2011. The first episode of Season 5 was released on Xbox Live and Zune on July 26, 2011, and was released on MSN on July 28.

=== Season 6 ===
Season 6 was mentioned at Comic-Con by Felicia Day. It was shot during the summer under new director Chris Preksta, creator of The Mercury Men. It premiered on October 2, 2012, on YouTube channel Geek & Sundry.

== See also ==
- Dead Pixels
