= Sean Michael Becker =

American film director (born 1981)

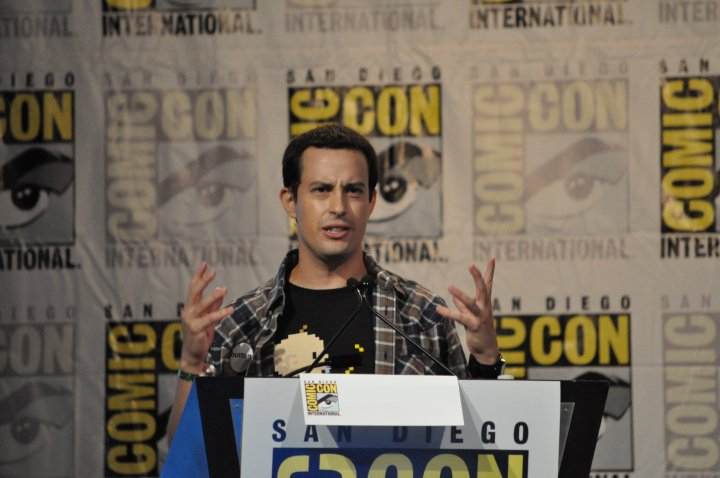
- Born: Sean Michael Becker; February 17, 1981 (age 45); San Jose, California, U.S.
- Occupations: Film director, producer, editor
- Years active: 2004–present

Sean Michael Becker (born February 17, 1981) is an American film director, film producer and editor who is best known for directing Felicia Day's web series, The Guild.

== Education ==
Becker attended San Jose State University 1999-2003 originally as a Business Marketing Major, but eventually graduated in 2003 with a BA in TV/Radio/Film and a Minor in Theater Arts. Upon graduation, Becker received the SJSU Emerson "DOC" Arends Award For Excellence in Directing for the Screen.

== Career ==
2004 - Directed video segments for the Seriously Unusual Television Network (S.U.T.N.) which was a Saturday night sketch show that aired on the UPN network.

2005 - Becker received a nomination and a win for a Northern California Regional Emmy Award in the category of "Entertainment Segment" for the short film "Parallel/Parallel".

2005 - Becker and producing partner Payman Benz combine all of their individual projects under the company AWKWARD PICTURES. They continue to produce joint projects under the company.

2006 - "The Long Walk Home" (written and directed by Sean Becker) wins Best Comedy at the RadioAlice Film Festival in San Francisco, California. It originally premiered earlier that year during the San Diego Comic-Con Film Festival.

2006 - "Tuesday", (written and directed by Payman Benz and Sean Becker) wins "Best Narrative Short" as part of the Moving Pictures Magazine Short Film Contest. The award was given at an event during the Sundance Film Festival.

2007 - "Tuesday" wins "Best in Fest" at the 2007 Wizard World Film Festival in Los Angeles.

2007 - Awkward Pictures wins the 1st YouTube Sketchies Contest, sponsored by Sierra Mist, where they faced off against over 5,000 other entrants.

2009 - Becker is nominated for two Streamy Awards, one in the category of editing and another in the category of comedy directing for his work on "The Guild".

2010 - Becker is nominated and wins a Streamy Award in the category of comedy directing for his work on "The Guild"

2011 - "The Jeff Lewis 5-Minute Comedy Hour" is named best Episodic Comedy Webseries of 2010 by Clicker.com

== Credits ==
=== Webseries Credits (Directing) ===
- Comedy Gumbo (with Payman Benz)
- The Guild
- The Jeff Lewis 5-Minute Comedy Hour
- My Gimpy Life
- Sound Advice

=== Team Unicorn Videos (Directing) ===
- 2010 - A Very Zombie Holiday
- 2011 - Super Harmony

=== Comics ===
- 2010 - Wrote the introduction for "The Guild" graphic novel (Collecting The Guild #1-3) for Dark Horse Comics.
- 2011 - co-wrote(with Felicia Day) "The Guild: Bladezz" one shot comic book for Dark Horse Comics.

== Representation ==
- New Wave Entertainment - Management
- United Talent Agency - Agency

== Organization membership ==
Becker is a inaugural member (2009) of International Academy of Web Television (IAWTV).
