= Felicia Day =

American actress (born 1979)

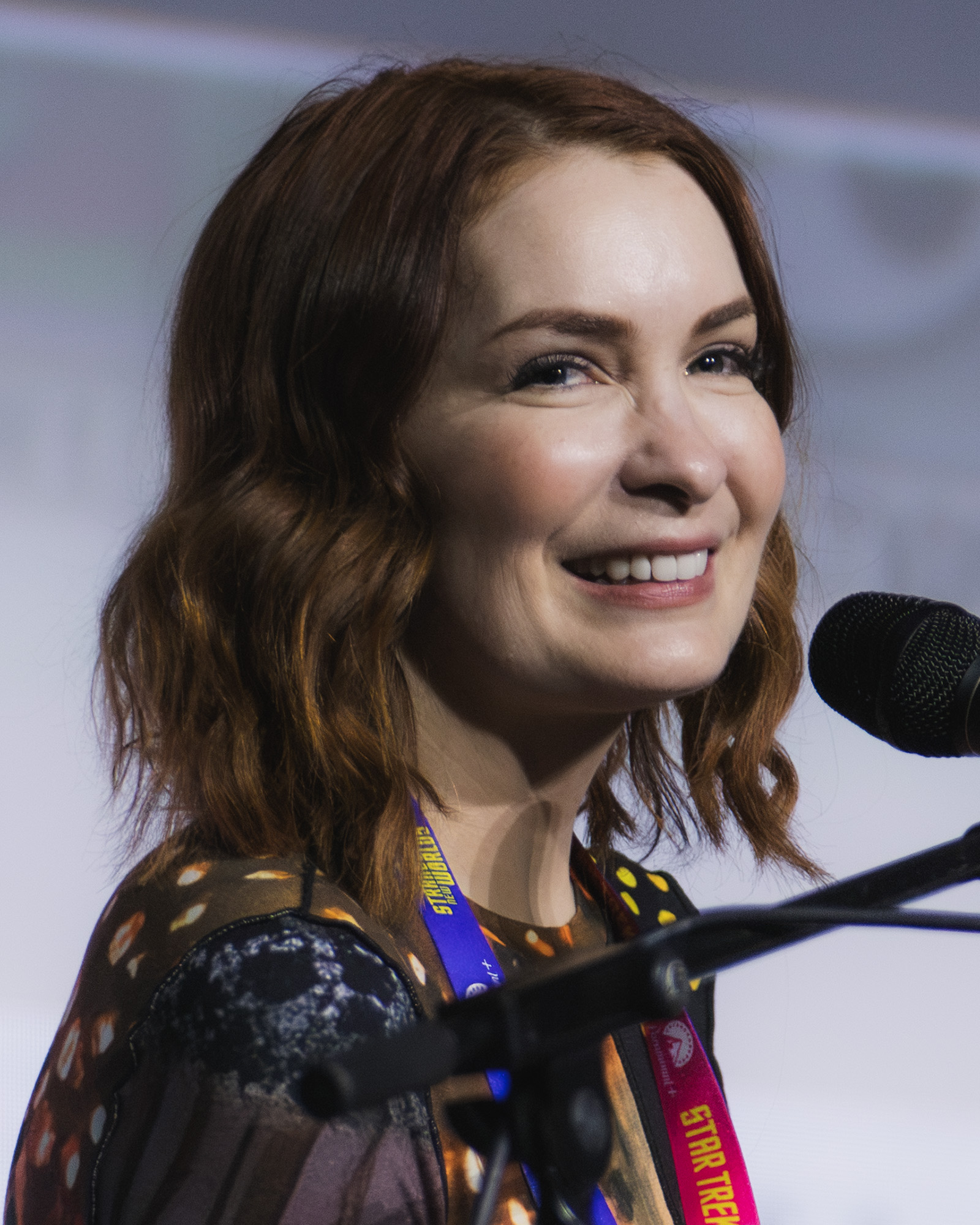
- Day in 2026
- Born: Kathryn Felicia Day; June 28, 1979 (age 47); Huntsville, Alabama, U.S.
- Education: University of Texas at Austin
- Occupations: Actress; singer; writer; producer
- Years active: 2001–present
- Children: 1
- Website: felicia.day

Kathryn Felicia Day (born June 28, 1979) is an American actress, singer, writer, and web series creator. She is the creator and star of the web series The Guild (2007–2013), a show loosely based on her life as a gamer. She also wrote and starred in the Dragon Age web series Dragon Age: Redemption (2011). She is a founder of the online media company Geek & Sundry, best known for hosting the show Critical Role between 2015 and 2019. Day was a member of the board of directors of the International Academy of Web Television from December 2009 until August 2012.

On television, Day has played Vi in the series Buffy the Vampire Slayer (2003) and Dr. Holly Marten in Eureka (2011), and had a recurring role as Charlie Bradbury on Supernatural (2012–2015, 2018–2020). She has also acted in films such as Bring It On Again (2004), as well as the Internet musical Dr. Horrible's Sing-Along Blog (2008). In April 2017, she began appearing as Kinga Forrester in Mystery Science Theater 3000.

== Early life ==
Day was born in Huntsville, Alabama. She began her acting career at the age of seven when she starred as Scout in a local production of To Kill a Mockingbird. She studied operatic singing and ballet professionally, performing at concerts and competitions nationwide. Home-schooled throughout much of her childhood, she began college at the age of sixteen.

She was a National Merit Scholar (1995) and graduated as valedictorian of her class. An accomplished violinist, Day was accepted to the Juilliard School of Music but chose to attend the University of Texas at Austin on a full scholarship in violin performance. She double majored in mathematics and music performance, and graduated at the age of nineteen in the top 4% of her class. She is also an avid player of a wide variety of video game genres. Much of her work on The Guild web series was based on her personal experience with video games, especially when she played World of Warcraft.

== Career ==
=== Early career ===
After graduation, Day moved to Los Angeles to pursue a career in acting. She landed several roles in various short and independent films as well as commercials and guest spots on television shows, including Undeclared and Maybe It's Me. These parts propelled her to larger roles: a part in the film Bring It On Again, the starring role in June, and a recurring guest spot as potential Slayer Vi on television's Buffy the Vampire Slayer, a recurring role that is still occasionally used in that show's eighth season comic book series. In HBO's 2005 biopic of Franklin D. Roosevelt, Warm Springs, Day's singing was featured when her wheelchair-using character serenaded a dinner group with "I Won't Dance".

=== The Guild ===
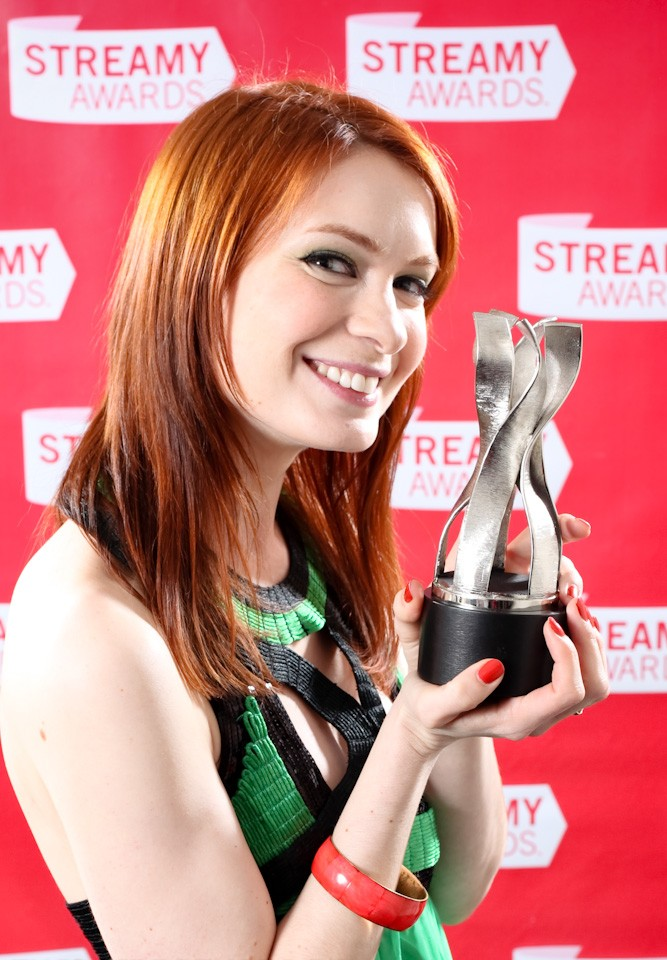
Felicia Day at the 2009 Streamy Awards

Day is the creator, writer, and star of The Guild, a web series which aired from 2007 to 2013 and explored the MMORPG gaming subculture. The first season was primarily hosted on YouTube, where it garnered millions of views. Its second season premiered on Microsoft's three major video channels, Xbox Live, MSN Video and The Zune Marketplace, after Microsoft made a deal with The Guild, allowing Day, her cast and her crew to be paid for their work.

Day also created a song and music video called "(Do You Wanna Date My) Avatar", featuring the cast dressed up as their in-game personae. The final moments of the music video itself also detailed that the release date for the third season of Day's The Guild would be August 25, 2009. A second song and Bollywood style video "Game On" was released prior to the premiere of the fourth season of The Guild. A third and final music video, called "I'm the One That's Cool", features the members of the cast in the guise of an alternative band performing at a local venue, intercut with scenes of the cast as younger versions of their characters experiencing bullying at the hands of "cooler" and more popular kids while at school.

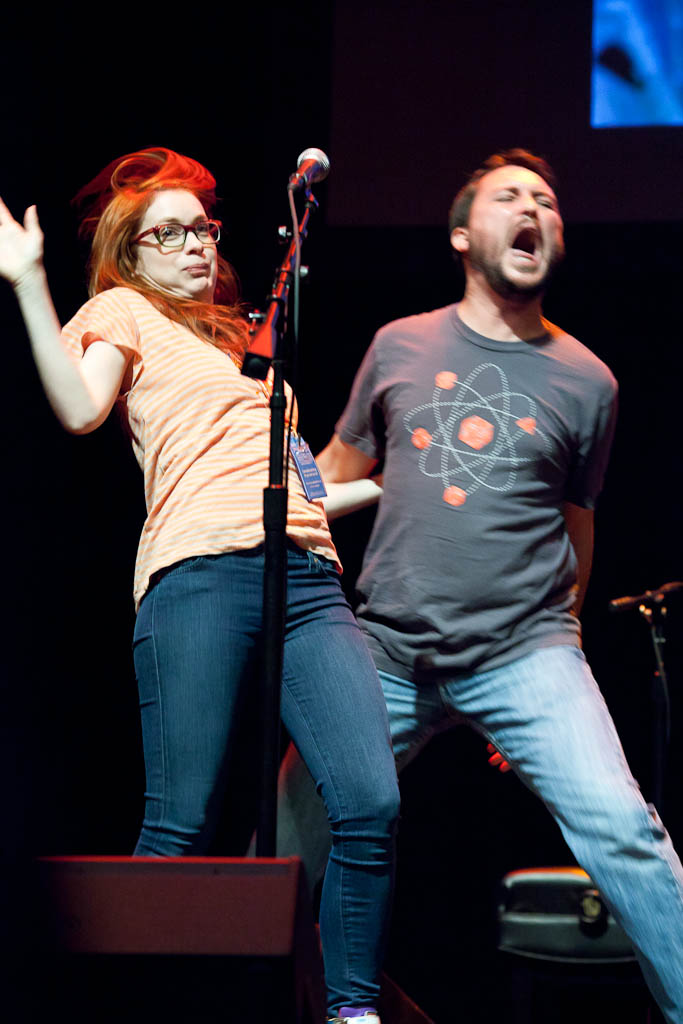
Felicia Day with The Guild co-star Wil Wheaton at w00tstock in 2011

The Guild has won multiple awards, including the Greenlight Award for Best Original Digital Series Production at the South by Southwest festivals, several IAWTV Awards, including Best Comedy Series, the YouTube Video Award for Best Series, the Yahoo! Video Award for Best Series, and 2009 Streamy Awards for Best Comedy Web Series, Best Female Actor in a Comedy Web Series, and Best Ensemble Cast in a Web Series.

=== Geek & Sundry ===
In March 2012, Day announced that she would be launching a premium YouTube channel, "Geek & Sundry", on April 2. Geek & Sundry took over production of The Guild for Season 6. Day hosted several shows on Geek & Sundry, most notably The Flog, Vaginal Fantasy, Felicia's Ark, and Co-Optitude (which co-stars Felicia's brother Ryon Day.)

In 2012, Day created the web series Tabletop with Wil Wheaton. She was an executive producer for the series and appeared regularly as a guest. In the same vein, in 2015, she suggested to the original cast of Critical Role to begin streaming their tabletop home game as a show. In 2013, Geek & Sundry and Atlas Games worked together to release a promotional pack for the card game Gloom for TableTop Day 2013 with a Felicia Day, Guild Goddess card.

In August 2014, Geek and Sundry was acquired by Legendary to produce content alongside of Chris Hardwick's Nerdist Industries, with Day retaining creative control. On January 11, 2016, Chinese conglomerate Wanda Group announced that it concluded an agreement with shareholders to acquire Legendary Entertainment for $3.5 billion. In 2016, Day left Geek & Sundry after growing "fatigued in a less creative, more managerial role in the company". Day said "I gave it my heart and my soul. When I realized I had given as much as I could, I needed to move on".

=== Other work ===
In July 2008, Day starred as Penny in the three-part web-based musical Dr. Horrible's Sing-Along Blog (created by Joss Whedon, who also created Dollhouse and Buffy the Vampire Slayer, in which Day had parts). Day was featured as a patient in the episode "Not Cancer" of the medical drama House, and had a guest starring role in an unaired episode of sci-fi drama Dollhouse entitled "Epitaph One", as well as its series finale, "Epitaph Two". Also in 2008, Day was featured in a series of commercials for Sears Blue Crew. She also appeared in the first of the revitalized Cheetos commercials.

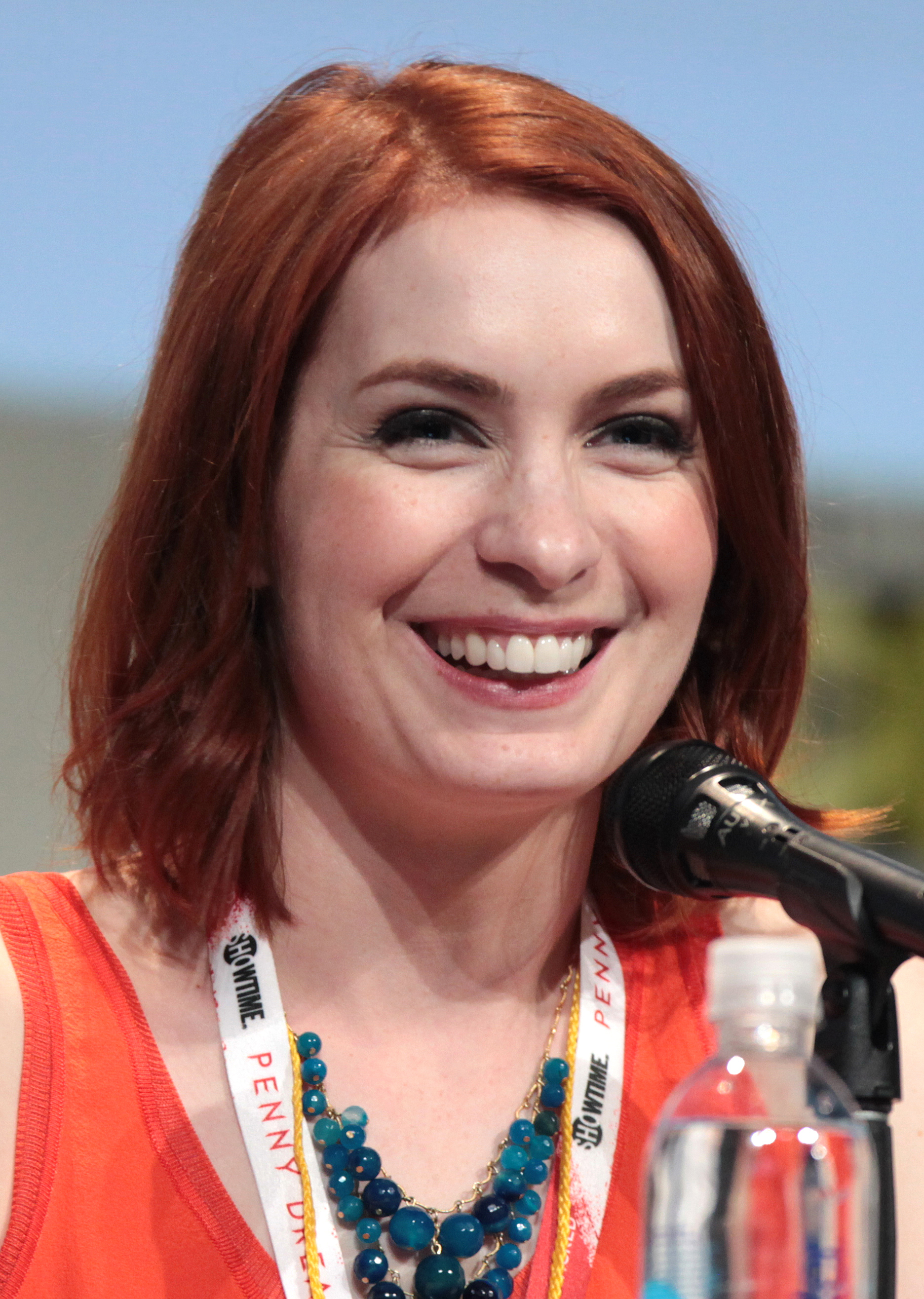
Day promoting Con Man at the 2015 San Diego Comic-Con.

In the series Lie to Me, on the episode called "Tractor Man", airing December 14, 2009, Day sang a song called "White Lie" alongside Brendan Hines. Day starred with Kavan Smith in the Syfy film adaption of the Little Red Riding Hood saga, called Red, produced by Angela Mancuso. Day also played the continuing role of Dr. Holly Marten in the Syfy channel's original series, Eureka, appearing in 18 episodes during the last two seasons of the show. Day has also played the role of 'Gorgol' in the web series MyMusic directed by The Fine Brothers.

In February 2011, Day announced that she would be starring in a new web miniseries called Dragon Age: Redemption, based on the Dragon Age video game series developed by BioWare and aired on October 10, 2011. Day plays an elf named Tallis, and returns as the voice and likeness for the character in the Dragon Age II downloadable content Mark of the Assassin.

In April 2012, it was announced that Day would host the 2012 IndieCade Awards Ceremony on October 4, 2012. Also in April of that year, Day appeared on the YouTube show MyMusic as a Norwegian Black Metal singer named Gorgol. She guest starred in the second season of the Jane Espenson scripted web series, Husbands. In October 2012, she guest starred on The Game Station podcast and appeared in an episode of My Drunk Kitchen.

In 2014, Alderac Entertainment Group included a Felicia Day card in the storage case expansion, The Big Geeky Box for their card game Smash Up. In 2015, Plaid Hat Games released a Felicia Day character card for their board game Dead of Winter: A Cross Roads Game for Tabletop Day 2015. On August 4, 2015, Day guest starred on Episode 9 of the Dear Hank & John podcast. On October 1, 2016, Day provided a guest voice for the Welcome to Night Vale podcast as Zookeeper Joanna Rey.

In April 2017, she began appearing as Kinga Forrester in Mystery Science Theater 3000. In August 2017, Day appeared as a guest in the My Little Pony: Friendship Is Magic episode "The Perfect Pear", voicing Pear "Buttercup" Butter, the presumed-deceased mother of one of the show's main characters, Applejack. In the episode, she also performs a romantic ballad, titled "You're In My Head Like a Catchy Song".

From 2018 to 2019, Day appeared in the third season of the SyFy series The Magicians as Poppy Kline. Day organized and hosted a Twitch charity livestream on June 30, 2018, in aid of Refugee and Immigrant Center for Education and Legal Services (RAICES), a Texas nonprofit. The 12-hour livestream raised over $212,000.

In 2022, Day hosted The Official The Lord of the Rings: The Rings of Power Podcast, and spent two months recording with the cast and crew while they were promoting the season around the world. She also interviewed cast members for a panel at New York Comic Con, which was recorded and released as a bonus episode of the podcast in November 2022. In 2024, she hosted the aftershow for the second season of The Lord of the Rings: The Rings of Power.

In 2023, Day created and starred in the scripted fantasy podcast titled Third Eye produced by Audible. The show was number 3 on the list of top fiction audio shows in October 2023 and won an Earphones Award from AudioFile Magazine.

In 2024, Day was a guest star in the stage production of Dungeons & Dragons: The Twenty-Sided Tavern which combines actual play, improv, and immersive theater at Stage 42 in New York City.

In 2026, Day wrote The Lost Daughter of Sparta, a graphic novel retelling of the Greek myth of Philonoe illustrated by Rowan McColl, and performed an unabridged narration for the audiobook version.

== Awards ==
In September 2008, TV Week included her in their list of Top 10 Web Video Creators.

During the inaugural Streamy Awards held in Los Angeles on March 28, 2009, Day received the award for the "Best Female Actor in a Comedy" for her work as protagonist Cyd Sherman in The Guild, and won the same award again in 2010.

She was also recognized for her work on Dr. Horrible's Sing-Along Blog in 2009. Day was also nominated for the Best Guest Appearance Award for the 3rd Streamy Awards.

In June 2018, she won a Behind the Voice Actors Award in Best Female Vocal Performance in a Television Series in a Guest Role for her role as Pear Butter in the episode "The Perfect Pear".

In 2023, Day was awarded the Inkpot Award during the annual San Diego Comic-Con.

Year	Award Show	Category	Work	Result
2009	1st Streamy Awards	Best Female Actor in a Comedy Web Series	The Guild	Won
2009	1st Streamy Awards	Best Ensemble Cast in a Web Series (shared with the rest of the cast)	The Guild	Won
2009	1st Streamy Awards	Best Writing in a Comedy Web Series	The Guild	Nominated
2010	2nd Streamy Awards	Best Female Actor in a Comedy Web Series	The Guild	Won
2010	2nd Streamy Awards	Best Ensemble Cast in a Web Series (shared with the rest of the cast)	The Guild	Nominated
2010	2nd Streamy Awards	Best Writing in a Comedy Web Series	The Guild	Nominated
2012	Inaugural IAWTV Awards	Best Writing (Comedy)	The Guild	Won
2012	Inaugural IAWTV Awards	Best Female Performance (Comedy)	The Guild	Won
2013	2nd Annual IAWTV Awards	Best Writing (Non-Fiction)	The Flog	Won
2013	3rd Streamy Awards	Best Writing – Comedy	The Guild	Nominated
2013	3rd Streamy Awards	Best Guest Appearance	MyMusic	Nominated
2017	Behind the Voice Actors Awards	Best Female Vocal Performance in a Television Series in a Guest Role	My Little Pony: Friendship Is Magic	Won

== Personal life ==
On January 3, 2017, Day announced on social media that she was pregnant and expecting a baby girl in a few weeks. She announced the birth of her daughter Calliope Maeve on January 30, 2017.

== Filmography ==
=== Film ===
Year	Title	Role	Notes
2001	Strings		
2003	Delusional		
2003	Backslide	Maddie	
2004	The Mortician's Hobby	Tiffany	
2004	Bring It On Again	Penelope	Direct-to-video
2004	Final Sale	Felicia	
2005	Short Story Time	Felicia	
2006	God's Waiting List	Trixie	
2007	Splitting Hairs	Sugar Girl	
2008	Prairie Fever	Blue	
2008	Dear Me	Pipsy	
2010	Red: Werewolf Hunter	Virginia Sullivan	
2011	Rock Jocks	Alison	
2014	Lust for Love	Mary	
2017	We Love You, Sally Carmichael!	Sarah	
2024	Tim Travers & The Time Traveler's Paradox	Delilah	

=== Television ===
Year	Title	Role	Notes
2001	Emeril	Cherie	Episode: "Whose Life Is It Anyway?"
2002	Maybe It's Me	Cookie	Episode: "The Crazy-Girl Episode"
2002	House Blend	Pam	Television film
2002	They Shoot Divas, Don't They?	Call Girl	Television film
2003	Buffy the Vampire Slayer	Vi	8 episodes
2003	For the People	Nicole	Episode: "Nexus"
2003	Undeclared	Sheila	Episode: "God Visits"
2004	Century City	Sheryl	Episode: "The Haunting"
2004	Strong Medicine	Jesse's Friend	Episode: "Positive Results"
2004	One on One	Sarah	Episode: "We'll Take Manhattan"
2004	June	June Marie Jacobs	Television film
2005	Warm Springs	Eloise Hutchinson	Television film
2005	Mystery Woman: Vision of a Murder	Emily	Television film
2005	Monk	Heidi Gefsky	Episode: "Mr. Monk Gets Drunk"
2006	Windfall	Danielle	2 episodes
2006	Love, Inc.	Natalie	Episode: "Hello, Larry"
2008	House	Apple	Episode: "Not Cancer"
2009	Roommates	Alyssa	3 episodes
2009	My Boys	Heather	Episode: "Madder of Degrees"
2009	Dollhouse	Mag	2 episodes
2009	Lie to Me	Ms. Angela	Episode: "Tractor Man"
2009	Three Rivers	Jeni	Episode: "A Roll of the Dice"
2010–2013	Generator Rex	Annie (voice)	3 episodes
2011–2012	Eureka	Dr. Holly Marten	18 episodes
2012	Fish Hooks	Angela (voice)	4 episodes
2012	Dan Vs.	The Boss (voice)	Episode: "Dan vs. The Boss"
2012–2014	The High Fructose Adventures of Annoying Orange	Ginger/Peach (voice)	29 episodes
2012–2020	Supernatural	Charlie Bradbury/Celeste Middleton	11 episodes
2016	We Bare Bears	Karla (voice)	Episode: "The Island"
2016	The Librarians	Charlotte	Episode: "And the Tears of a Clown"
2017	Be Cool, Scooby-Doo!	Violet Oberon (voice)	Episode: "Vote Velma"
2017	My Little Pony: Friendship Is Magic	Pear Butter (voice)	Episode: "The Perfect Pear"
2017	Danger & Eggs	Francesca (voice)	Episode: "Check Mates/Pirate Gorgeous"
2017–2018	Adventure Time	Betty Grof (voice)	8 episodes
2017–2018	Stretch Armstrong and the Flex Fighters	Erika Violette (voice), additional voices	14 episodes
2017–2022	Mystery Science Theater 3000	Kinga Forrester	33 episodes
2017–2018	Skylanders Academy	Cynder (voice)	
2018	Miles from Tomorrowland	Grendel / Hemeran (voice)	Episode: "Grendel's Moving Castle"
2018	Robot Chicken	Livewire/Jessica Rabbit (voice)	Episode: "Never Forget"
2018–2019	The Magicians	Poppy Kline	4 episodes
2019, 2023	The Rookie	Dr. Morgan	2 episodes
2020	Into the Dark	Molly	Episode: "Pooka Lives!"
2020	Glitch Techs	Simi / Emma (voice)	3 episodes
2020	Spider-Man	Mary Jane Watson (voice)	3 episodes
2021	The Owl House	Bria (voice)	Episode: "Through the Looking Glass Ruins"
2022	The Legend of Vox Machina	Captain of Emon, Bandit #2 (voice)	
2022	Monster High	Ghoulia Yelps (voice)	
2023	Adventure Time: Fionna and Cake	Betty Grof (voice)	3 episodes

=== Web series and podcasts ===
Year	Title	Role	Notes
2007–2013	The Guild	Cyd Sherman/Codex	Creator
2008	Retarded Policeman #7.5: Fish	Herself	
2008	Dr. Horrible's Sing-Along Blog	Penny	
2008–2010	The Legend of Neil	Fairy	5 episodes
2009	IRrelevant Astronomy	Felicia Day	Episode: "Behind the Scenes: When Galaxies Collide"
2010	A Comicbook Orange	Herself	Episode: "Felicia Day & Viking"
2010	The Webventures of Justin and Alden	Herself	2 episodes
2011	Dragon Age: Redemption	Tallis	Writer & co-producer
2011	The Big Chew	Marjorie	YouTube production
2012	MyMusic	Gorgol	Episode: "INVISIBLE!"; YouTube Internet series
2012	Husbands	Sexy Pizza Girl	Web series
2012	YOMYOMF	Herself	Episode: "KevJumba Takes the SAT w/ Felicia Day"; YouTube Internet series
2012	The Game Station Podcast	Herself	Episode: "Episode 27"; YouTube Internet series
2012	Rewind YouTube Style 2012	Carly Rae Jepsen	Single video
2012–2014	My Gimpy Life	Felicia	2 episodes YouTube Internet series
2012–2017	Tabletop	Herself	10 episodes
2012–2018	The Flog	Herself	Weekly vlog on Geek & Sundry
2012–2018	Vaginal Fantasy	Herself	Monthly hangout on Geek & Sundry
2013	Felicia's Ark	Herself	Weekly series running from April 1 to May 13. YouTube Internet series
2013	Nerdy Nummies	Herself	Episode: "D20 Dice Cookies"
2013	Co-Optitude	Herself	YouTube Internet series
2013	Spellslingers	Herself	2 episodes YouTube Internet series
2013	Outlands	84	YouTube Internet series
2015	Critical Role (campaign 1)	Lyra	Episodes: "Trial of the Take: Part 1 & 2"
2015	Rooster Teeth Podcast	#337	YouTube Web series
2015–2017	Con Man	Karen	Webseries, 5 episodes
2016–2022	Hello from the Magic Tavern	Jyn'Leeviyah the Red	Improvised fiction podcast, 6 episodes
2017	The Game Awards	Herself	Presenter; industry icon
2019	Good Mythical Morning	Herself	Alien Food Taste Test
2022	Headless: A Sleepy Hollow Story	Henrietta Hudson	2 episodes
2022	The Official The Lord of the Rings: The Rings of Power Podcast	Herself	Podcast, 9 episodes
2023	Third Eye	Laurel Pettigrew	Scripted fantasy comedy podcast, written by Day
2024	Rhett & Link's Wonderhole	Draven the Technonaut	Voice, episode: "We Opened A 200 Year Old Time Capsule"
2025	Lost Odyssey: Godfall	Sylph	Presented by Geek & Sundry, Demiplane and Lost Odyssey Events; charity special to support Extra Life.

=== Video games ===
Year	Title	Role	Notes
2010	Rock of the Dead	Mary Beth	
2010	Fallout: New Vegas	Veronica Santangelo	
2011	Dragon Age II: Mark of the Assassin	Tallis	
2012	Guild Wars 2	Zojja	
2014	Family Guy: The Quest for Stuff	Herself	
2015	Guild Wars 2: Heart of Thorns	Zojja	
2018	Monster Prom	Violet	
2020	The Dungeon of Naheulbeuk: The Amulet of Chaos	The Wizardress	
2023	Stray Gods: The Roleplaying Musical	Athena	
2025	Date Everything!	Skylar Specs	
2026	Mewgenics	Cats	Creature role

=== Audiobooks ===
Year	Title	Role	Notes	Ref
2020	The World of Critical Role	Narrator		
2024	Red Sonja: Consumed	Narrator		
2026	The Lost Daughter of Sparta	Narrator		

=== Stage ===
Year	Title	Role	Venue	Ref.
2024	Dungeons & Dragons: The Twenty-Sided Tavern	Mage	Stage 42	

== Other works ==
=== Books ===
Day is the author of the memoir You're Never Weird on the Internet (Almost), Embrace Your Weird: Face Your Fears and Unleash Creativity, as well as numerous works relating to The Guild web series.

Day's first graphic novel, The Lost Daughter of Sparta, was published in March 2026. It was illustrated by Rowan MacColl.

=== Music ===
Day created a few singles:

- Do You Wanna Date My Avatar (with her co-stars of The Guild; 2009)
- I'm the One That's Cool (with her co-stars of The Guild; 2012)
- Gamer Girl, Country Boy (with Jason Charles Miller; 2012)
