= VSB =

VSB may refer to:

== Organizations ==
- Vancouver School Board, common name for School District 39 Vancouver, British Columbia
- United Swiss Railways (German: Vereinigte Schweizerbahnen), a former railway company in Switzerland
- Villanova School of Business at Villanova University, Philadelphia, Pennsylvania
- Virginia State Bar, an administrative agency of the Supreme Court of Virginia
- Völkisch-Social Bloc, a right-wing electoral alliance in post-World War I Germany
- VSB-TV, a defunct NBC affiliate in Bermuda
- Technical University of Ostrava (Czech: Vysoká škola báňská - Technická univerzita Ostrava), in the city of Ostrava, Czech Republic

== Other uses ==
- Finno-Soviet Treaty of 1948 (Swedish: Vänskaps-, samarbets- och biståndsavtalet), the basis for Finno–Soviet relations from 1948 to 1992
- Vestigial sideband, in radio communications, a sideband that has been only partly cut off or suppressed
- Very small business, companies that are at the lower end, in terms of size, to companies that are considered small and medium enterprise
- V_{SB}, (voltage standby), a power supply line on an ATX motherboard form factor that stays active when the power supply is not active
- Space Quest: Vohaul Strikes Back, a fan-made sequel to the Space Quest video game series
