= The Next Mutation =

The Next Mutation may refer to:

- Ninja Turtles: The Next Mutation, an American television series
- Space Quest V, an adventure game, subtitled The Next Mutation
- RAWGWAR: The Next Mutation, a video release from Gwar
