= Space Quest I =

1986 video game

Space Quest: Chapter I – The Sarien Encounter
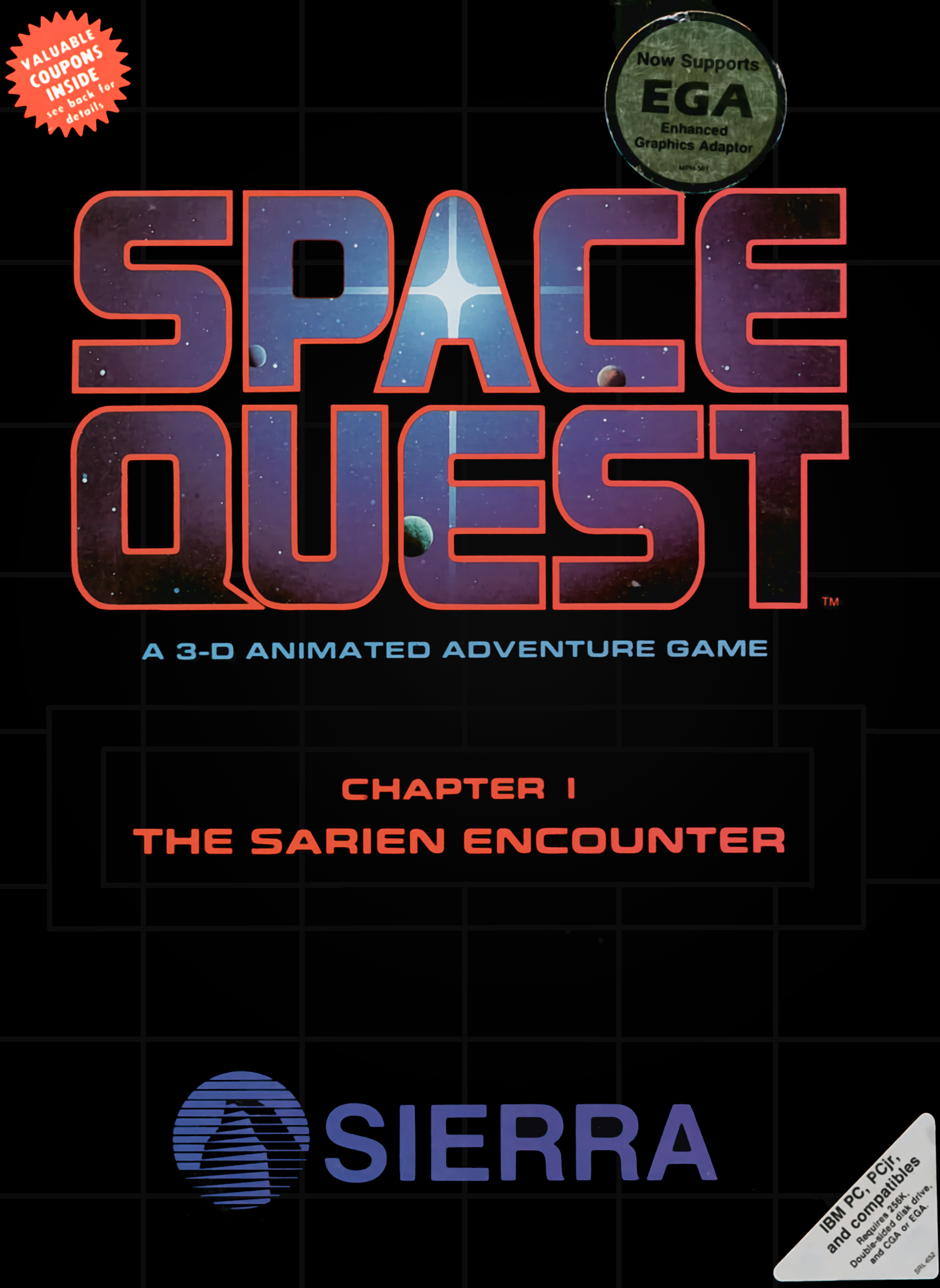
- Original cover art.
- Developer: Sierra On-Line
- Publisher: Sierra On-Line
- Designers: Mark Crowe; Scott Murphy
- Programmers: Scott Murphy; Ken Williams; Sol Ackerman
- Artist: Mark Crowe
- Composer: Mark Crowe
- Series: Space Quest
- Engine: AGI
- Platforms: DOS, Macintosh, Apple II, Apple IIGS, Amiga, Atari ST
- Release: September–October 1986
- Genre: Adventure
- Mode: Single-player

Space Quest: Chapter I – The Sarien Encounter (commonly known as Space Quest I) is a graphic adventure game, created by Scott Murphy and Mark Crowe, and released in October 1986 by Sierra On-Line. It is the first game in the Space Quest series, and sees players assume the role of a lowly janitor on a research ship, who becomes involved in stopping an alien race using a new form of technology for evil purposes.

The game was the first to be created by Murphy and Crowe, after working on other Sierra titles at the time, such as King's Quest II. Part of their proposal included moving away from the serious, medieval settings of other titles, in favor of making a "fun, silly game", utilizing Sierra's AGI engine. Space Quest I became an instant hit, selling in excess of 100,000 copies and spawning several sequels, beginning with Space Quest II in 1987.

A remake of the game by Sierra was released in 1991, featuring updated graphics, gameplay, and sound. In 1992, Adventure Comics created a three-issue comic based on the game's plot.

== Gameplay ==
Gameplay screenshot (Atari ST)

The game was created using Sierra's AGI engine and featured a pseudo-3D environment, allowing the character to move in front of and behind background objects. The primary means of input in Space Quest, as in many other AGI games, was through the use of a text parser for entering commands and the use of the keypad or arrow keys for moving Roger Wilco around the screen. The Amiga, Apple IIGS, Atari ST, and Mac versions of the game offered basic mouse support for movement as well. The game had a 160×200 resolution displaying 16 colors. Sound cards were not available in 1986 for the PC, so sound was played through the PC's internal speaker; owners of Tandy 1000, PCjr, and Amiga computers would hear a three-voice soundtrack, while Apple IIGS owners were treated to a fifteen-voice soundtrack with notably richer sound.

A precursor of this game is the interactive fiction game Planetfall, created by Infocom, whose player-character is a lowly "Ensign Seventh Class" who does the lowest form of labor aboard a spaceship and who appears on the cover with a mop. Just as King's Quest adapted the text-adventure puzzle games set in a medieval world to a visual display, Space Quest did the same for the space puzzle game.

As a form of copy protection, coordinates in the VGA version of the game, while in the escape pod, as well as the rocket purchased at Tiny's Used Spaceships, are only found in the manual. Also, the code for retrieving the cartridge aboard the Arcada can only be found in the manual. The AGI version had key disk protection, where the user was required to insert the original game floppy on startup.

Sierra released three versions of Space Quest: the original 1986 AGI V2 release, the 1987 AGI V3 release, and the 1990 VGA release. Aside from minor sound and graphic differences, the PC, Amiga, Atari ST, and Apple IIGS versions are essentially identical. The Mac version is considerably different, however, being monochrome and completely menu-driven. Space Quest I also had an 8-bit Apple II version for the IIe and IIc. This had no pull-down menus and displayed all text at the bottom of the screen.

Along with King's Quest III, Space Quest was the first Sierra game to feature pull-down menus, be hard disk installable, and not require a specially formatted save disk (except the Apple II version as noted above).

== Plot ==
=== Setting ===
Space Quest I takes place in a universe in the far future, which parodies significant science fiction. Players assume the role of a janitor who they can name; by default, his name is "Roger Wilco"—often assumed to be a reference to the radio communication, "Roger, Will Comply", but actually a reference to a B. Kliban comic strip, which became the de facto name of the hero in the later games of the series.

=== Story ===
Within the Earnon galaxy, Roger Wilco, a janitor aboard the scientific spaceship Arcada, awakens from an on-duty nap in his broom closet to find that the ship has been boarded and seized by the sinister Sariens. He soon learns that they have stolen a powerful experimental device called the Star Generator, which could cause untold disaster in their hands. Acquiring a keycard from a dead crew member's body, Roger flees the ship in an escape pod. Moments later, the Arcada self-destructs.

The pod crash-lands on the planet Kerona, a dry, barren wasteland. Roger defeats a spider-droid that the Sariens dispatched to eliminate him. In a cave system near his crash site, he is greeted by a mysterious figure, who offers help if he kills a monstrous creature called Orat. After Roger succeeds in the task, the figure supplies him with a skimmer craft to help him reach the town of Ulence Flats, where he can find a new ship.

Reaching Ulence Flats, Roger gambles on a slot machines in a cantina to acquire the money needed to buy a spaceship, along with a navigation droid to pilot it; during this time, he learns from a bar customer the location of the Sariens' spaceship, the Deltaur. Roger boards the Deltaur and secures a Sarien disguise. Roger programs the Star Generator to self-destruct and then escapes the ship just before it explodes.

At the end of the game, Roger's efforts are rewarded when he receives the Golden Mop as a token of eternal gratitude from the people of Xenon.

== Cultural references ==
Space Quest I includes a number of visual and thematic homages to well-known works of science fiction.

Sierra reportedly received complaints regarding the inclusion of references to certain real-world entities without authorization in Space Quest I. The retailer Toys "R" Us objected to the depiction of a robot shop named "Droids R Us," which was subsequently renamed "Droids B Us." In the 1991 remake, a background character resembling the Toys “R” Us mascot, Geoffrey the Giraffe, was added as a visual nod to this dispute. The rock band ZZ Top also raised concerns that a group of musicians featured briefly in the game's cantina scene resembled them; despite this, similar characters appear in some versions of the VGA remake.

== Reception ==
Compute! praised the Apple IIGS version's sound and graphics, stating that players "may think they're watching a cartoon." It concluded that the game "is one of the better new adventure games to arrive." In contrast, Computer Gaming World reviewer Scorpia described Space Quest I as "a middle-of-the-road game," noting that while it would not challenge experienced players, it should provide adequate difficulty for novices "as long as they don't mind the arcade sequences."

According to Sierra On-Line, combined sales of the Space Quest series surpassed 1.2 million units by the end of March 1996.

== Remake ==
Space Quest I: Roger Wilco in the Sarien Encounter
- Developer: Sierra On-Line
- Publisher: Sierra On-Line
- Directors: Bill Davis; Douglas Herring; Scott Murphy
- Producer: Stuart Moulder
- Designers: Mark Crowe; Scott Murphy
- Programmers: Jerry Shaw; Hugh Diedrichs; Dave Jamriska; Randy MacNeill
- Artist: Douglas Herring
- Composers: Ken Allen; Mark Seibert
- Engine: SCI1
- Platforms: DOS, Macintosh, Amiga
- Release: August 20, 1991
- Genre: Adventure
- Mode: Single-player

Space Quest was eventually remade using Sierra's newer SCI game engine, which, among many other improvements, allowed the game to move from its original 16-color EGA graphics to 256-color VGA. Rebranded Space Quest I: Roger Wilco in the Sarien Encounter to follow the series' new naming convention introduced in Space Quest IV, this version was released on August 20, 1991. In addition to the new VGA graphics, which were drawn in a 1950s retrofuturistic B-movie style, it featured digitized sounds and a new interface, with text-entry being replaced by an icon interface.

When leaving Ulence Flats in the VGA version, the time pod from Space Quest IV appears. Space Quest IV was developed around the same time. However, a continuity error occurs, as the time pod appears in a different place than in Space Quest IV.

=== Reception ===
The 1991 remake of the game was reviewed in Dragon, receiving 5 out of 5 stars. Writing for VideoGames & Computer Entertainment, Arnie Katz noted that the game "benefited from a recent face-lift." He added, "The graphics are much better, and the point-and-click interface makes play easier than the parser-driven original."

Dante Kleinberg of Adventure Gamers stated that the game is "nicely detailed and pleasing to the eye". Retro Freak Reviews recommended the remake over the original, stating that the humor, art, animation, and music were improved.
