= Gary Owens =

American DJ and radio personality (1934–2015)

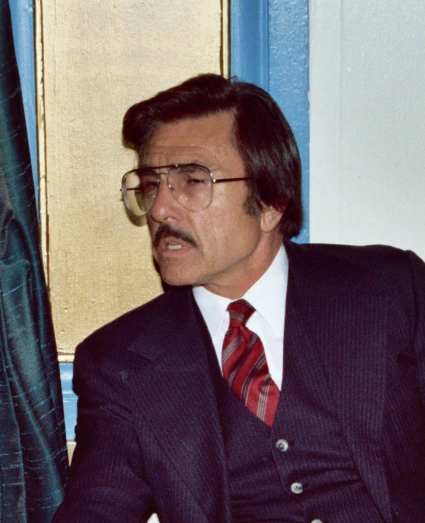
- Owens in San Diego, 1982
- Born: Gary Bernard Altman; May 10, 1934; Mitchell, South Dakota, U.S.
- Died: February 12, 2015 (aged 80); Encino, California, U.S.
- Occupations: Disc jockey; voice actor; announcer; radio personality
- Years active: 1952–2015
- Spouse: Arleta Markell (m. 1956)
- Children: 2
- Awards: Inkpot Award (1981)

Gary Owens (born Gary Bernard Altman; May 10, 1934 – February 12, 2015) was an American disc jockey, voice actor, announcer and radio personality. His polished baritone speaking voice generally offered deadpan recitations of total nonsense, which he frequently demonstrated as the announcer on Rowan & Martin's Laugh-In. Owens was equally proficient in straight or silly assignments and was frequently heard on television and radio as well as in commercials.

He was best known, aside from being the announcer on Laugh-In, for providing the voices of the titular superhero on Space Ghost and of Blue Falcon in Dynomutt, Dog Wonder. He also played himself in a cameo appearance on Space Ghost Coast to Coast in 1998. Owens' first cartoon-voice acting was performing the voice of Roger Ramjet on the Roger Ramjet cartoons. He later served as announcer of Antenna TV.

== Early life ==
Owens was born in Mitchell, South Dakota, the son of Venetta Clark Altman, an educator and county auditor, and Bernard Joseph Altman, a county treasurer and sheriff, but grew up in Plankinton, South Dakota.

== Career ==
=== 1950s ===
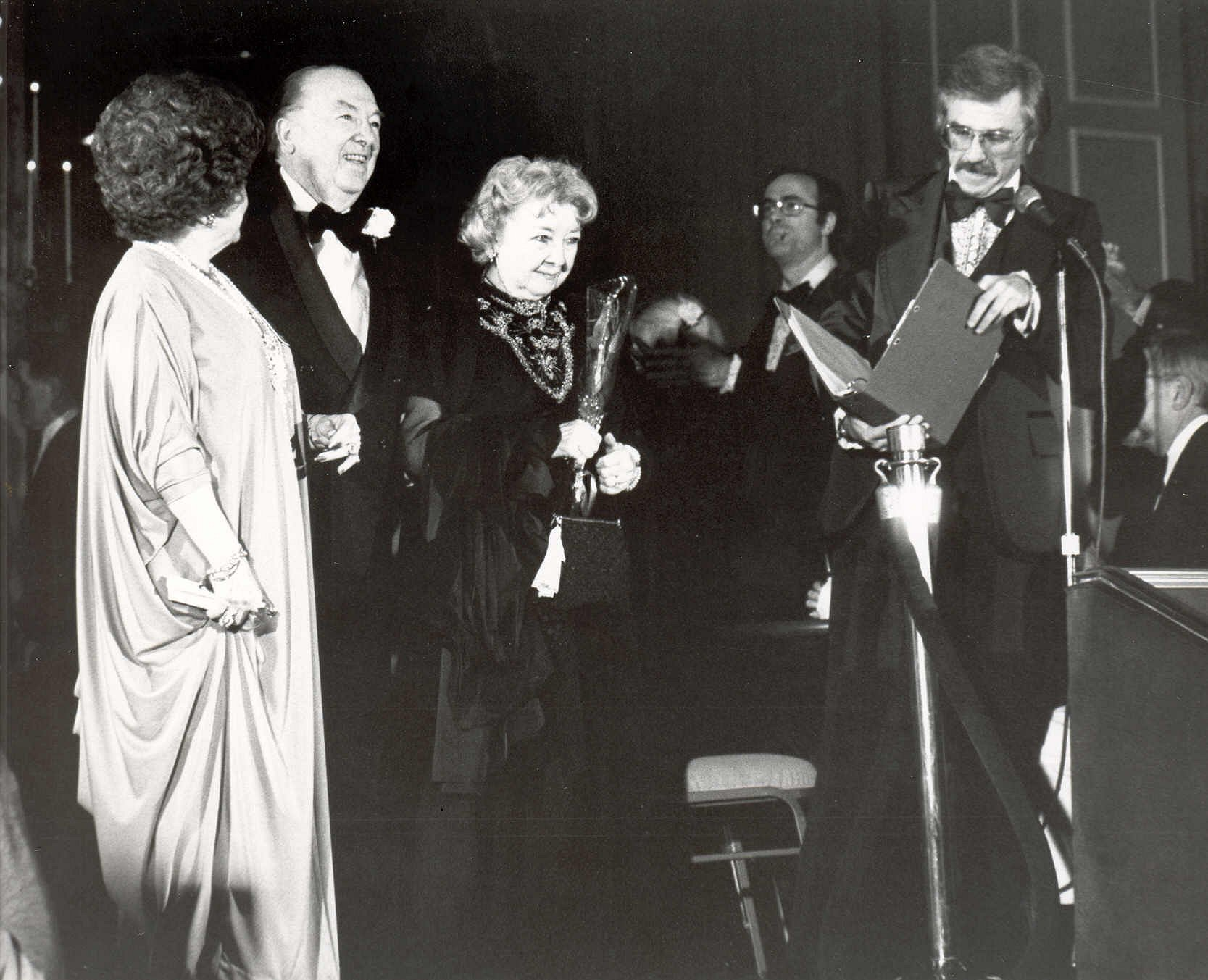
Gary Owens and Jack Haley, 1979.

Audio clip of Gary Owens as News Director at AM 1490 KORN in Mitchell, South Dakota, early to mid-1950s.

Owens started his radio career in 1952 as a news reporter at KORN in Mitchell, South Dakota, and two years later was promoted to news director. In 1956, he left KORN for a newscaster job at KMA, Shenandoah, Iowa, before moving on to a disc jockey job at KOIL, Omaha, Nebraska. He also worked in Dallas, New Orleans, St. Louis, and at KIMN in Denver before relocating to California in 1959, working at KROY in Sacramento and KEWB in Oakland before finally settling in Los Angeles.

=== 1960s ===
Owens moved to KEWB's sister station 980 KFWB in Los Angeles in 1961. From there, he joined the staff of 710 KMPC in 1962, where he remained for the next two decades, replacing previous afternoon host Johnny Grant, working the 3 p.m. to 6 p.m. shift Monday through Friday. A gifted punster, Owens became known for his surrealistic humor. Among his trademarks were daily appearances by "The Story Lady" (played by Joan Gerber); the Rumor of the Day; myriad varieties of "The Nurney Song"; and the introduction of the nonsense word "insegrevious", which was briefly included in the Funk & Wagnalls Dictionary.

His regular on-air radio terms included "krenellemuffin", as in "We'll be back in just a krenellemuffin." Gary always credited his radio engineer at the end of his broadcast: "I'd like to thank my engineer, Wayne Doo, for creebling at the turntables" (referring to KMPC engineer Wayne DuBois). He also created the previously non-existent colors "veister" and "krelb".

In the early 1960s, like punster-TV star comic colleagues Ernie Kovacs, Steve Allen, and Jonathan Winters, Owens created a few comic characters of his own, such as the gruff old man Earl C. Festoon and his wife Phoebe Festoon, the stuffy old businessman Endocrine J. Sternwallow, and the goofy good ol' boy, Merle Clyde Gumpf. Another character was crotchety old cantankerous Mergenthaler Waisleywillow.

Owens also did amusing radio promotions, such as sending in for "Yours", which turned out to be a postcard from him at the radio station which simply said "Yours" on it; autographed pictures of the Harbor Freeway in Los Angeles; and his famous "Moo Cow Report", in which Gary and his character Earl C. Festoon would describe where cows were moving inbound on the crowded freeways of Los Angeles.

During this time Owens was also known as "Superbeard", because like his contemporary radio icon Wolfman Jack, he sported a goatee-beard, Hawaiian shirts, baggy Bermuda shorts, and his "1941 wide necktie with a hula girl on it". Often during these comedy sketches on the air, he would have the assistance of other radio comics, most notably Bob Arbogast (known as "Arbo" to his fans), Stan Ross (of "Drowning in the Surf" fame in 1963), and Jim "Weather Eyes" Hawthorne.

Owens appeared on eight episodes of the 1966-67 television series The Green Hornet.

Owens also did his famous "Good Evening Kiss" on KMPC when he was on from 9 p.m. to midnight, by saying, "Now I'll just snuggle up to a nice warm microphone, and embracemoi", making a big wet kiss sound effect followed by the sound effect of a gong striking. In 1966, Owens collaborated with Bob Arbogast, June Foray, Daws Butler, Paul Frees, and others on a comedy spoof record album titled Sunday Morning With the Funnies with the Jimmy Haskell Orchestra on Reprise Records.

During this period, Owens became more widely known as the voice of the eponymous television cartoon characters in Roger Ramjet and Space Ghost; the excitable narrator/announcer from The Perils of Penelope Pitstop; and perhaps most well-known, as the hand-on-the-ear announcer in the booth on Rowan & Martin's Laugh-In, all the while continuing his show on KMPC. He also hosted its daily game show spin-off, Letters to Laugh-In, during its brief run in 1969.

Capitalizing on Owens' Laugh-In fame, Mel Blanc Audiomedia, an audio production company based in Beverly Hills, developed and marketed The Gary Owens Special Report, a 260-episode package of syndicated radio comedy shows.

Owens appeared in the Sesame Street pilots in a sketch called "The Man from Alphabet" as the title character, a bumbling spy in a trench coat who, with the help of a young paperboy called H.B., tried to catch the villainous Digby Dropout and his henchman Dunce using clues from H.B.'s "Alphabet Book". Initially, the Man was also to have had a chief, "Teacher". The segments were created by Sesame Street executive producer David Connell and referenced such tongue-in-cheek spy series as Get Smart and The Man from U.N.C.L.E.. Despite the advance publicity, and Connell's investment in the series, "The Man from Alphabet" proved to be a failure with test audiences. The Man from Alphabet's constant bungling and problem-solving attempts confused kids and the lessons never came across. H.B.'s role as the true problem-solver was not clearly understood, a fact exacerbated by the child actor's stilted delivery and poor diction. As assessed by Edward L. Palmer, "The amount of truly effective educational content, relative to our goals, is virtual nil." After reviewing the test results, producer Connell advised that the segments be shelved, referring to them as "Connell's Folly". The segments never aired on Sesame Street.

Owens was a scriptwriter for Jay Ward Productions, appeared in many series for Walt Disney, and did over 30,000 commercials. He was also a guest star on The Munsters, I Dream of Jeannie, and McHale's Navy.

During the late 1960s, when the films of 1930s comedians such as the Marx Brothers, W. C. Fields, and Mae West were finding a new audience, Owens narrated phonograph records containing sound clips from the films.

Owens appeared as the racing correspondent in Disney's The Love Bug (1968).

=== 1970s ===
In 1972, he released the comedy LP Put Your Head On My Finger for the MGM-Pride label.

In 1973, Owens wrote The (What to Do While You're Holding the) Phone Book (ISBN 0-87477-015-7), a comedic look at the history of the telephone, and appeared in the first season of Barnaby Jones, in the episode titled "Twenty Million Alibis", playing the role of Gary Michaels.

On the live album Uptown Rulers by the funk band The Meters, Owens can be heard on the first track introducing the band. The live recording took place on March 24, 1975, at Paul and Linda McCartney's release party for the Venus and Mars album held aboard the RMS Queen Mary.

Owens did the humorous news blurbs that are interspersed throughout the 1975 film The Prisoner of Second Avenue. In 1976–77, he hosted the first season of the nighttime version of The Gong Show; he was replaced by the show's creator, Chuck Barris. In that same year, Owens became the voice of a new cartoon character, the Blue Falcon, a character who fought crime in fictional Big City with the "help" of his clumsy sidekick, Dynomutt, also known as Dynomutt, Dog Wonder. The series was a parody of Batman, specifically the live-action version starring Adam West. It was not uncommon to see the Blue Falcon use various "falcon gadgets", much like Batman used various "Bat-Equipment" items. The falcon belt was used in a similar fashion to Batman's utility belt with an endless supply of weapons and other devices. Owens would provide the voice of the Blue Falcon from 1976 through 1977 in 20 half-hour episodes. The 1977 episodes were broken into two parts that ran 11 minutes each — 16 episodes in 1976 and four in 1977. Also, he narrated Yogi's Space Race in 1978 and announced for Disney's Wonderful World, starting in 1979.

=== 1980s ===
Owens received a Hollywood Walk of Fame Star in 1980, between those of Walt Disney and Betty White. On August 30, 1983, Owens emceed the unveiling ceremony for the Hollywood Walk of Fame Star for The Three Stooges. Owens, a long-time friend of the Stooges, had been a major driving force in helping the Stooges get the Star. The ceremony was featured on Entertainment Tonight.

In the 1980s, he announced on jazz radio station KKJZ (then KKGO-FM) in Long Beach, California.

On the weekend of September 12–13, 1981, Owens substituted for his old KEWB station partner Casey Kasem on American Top 40. This was his only appearance on radio's first nationally syndicated countdown show. In that same year, Watermark Inc. chose Owens to replace Murray "The K" Kaufman as permanent host of Soundtrack Of The Sixties, an oldies retrospective show that ran in syndication through 1984. Immediately afterward, he hosted Creative Radio's Gary Owens' Supertracks, which was an oldies retrospective show similar to Soundtrack Of The Sixties, except it presented the fifties, sixties, and seventies.

He was the narrator of Walt Disney World's EPCOT Center pavilion, World of Motion, which operated between 1982 and 1996. His television special was "The Roots of Goofy", which aired from the mid-1980s to the early 1990s.

Owens moved from KMPC to another Los Angeles station, 1150 KPRZ, in 1982, hosting mornings at the "Music of Your Life" adult standards station. Owens in the morning and Dick Whittinghill in afternoon drive was an inversion of Owens' KMPC years.

When Roger Barkley surprisingly walked out of the long-running Lohman and Barkley Show on KFI in Los Angeles, Owens briefly teamed with Al Lohman for the successful morning commute show. Jeff Gehringer was brought on as producer. The program ended after the station changed its format to all-talk.

Owens had a bit part as an emcee for "Pimp of the Year", a dream scene in the 1988 comedy I'm Gonna Git You Sucka.

Owens also co-starred in a number of documentaries about dinosaurs in the 1980s alongside Chicago's Eric Boardman. These documentaries were distributed by the Midwich Entertainment group for the Disney Channel before it went from being a premium pay channel on cable to a standard channel.

Owens guest starred on one episode of The Super Mario Bros. Super Show!

From 1987 to 1992, Owens was the voice of Lt. Dirk Niblick of the Math Brigade, the protagonist of an animated series which was part of PBS's Square One TV.

Owens was the voice narrator on the ABC Saturday morning animated series Mighty Orbots in 1984.

In 1989 Owens appeared in Night Court, season 7 episode 7, entitled "Auntie Maim". Owens played DJ Bobby Bumgartner.

=== 1990s ===
In the late 1990s, Owens hosted the morning show on the Music of Your Life radio network, where he later had the evening shift and hosted a weekend afternoon show until 2006. He also announced pre-recorded station IDs for Parksville, British Columbia radio station CHPQ-FM (The Lounge), and for humorist Gary Burbank's long-running afternoon show on WLW in Cincinnati, Ohio (Burbank took his stage name from Owens). Owens was also the announcer for America's Funniest Home Videos from 1995 to 1997, the last three years of Bob Saget's hosting tenure, replacing Ernie Anderson.

The cartoon SWAT Kats: The Radical Squadron featured Owens as the voice of Commander Ulysses Feral, a police chief constantly butting heads with the two main protagonists.

Owens guest starred on The Ren & Stimpy Show as the voice of Powdered Toast Man.

He lent his voice as the narrator for the 1992 voiced CD-ROM version of Sierra On-Line's Space Quest IV. He again assumed the role in the series' final installment, 1995's Space Quest 6.

From 1994 to 1995, Owens narrated the opening and interstitial bumpers of Superhuman Samurai Syber-Squad.

In 1998, he appeared on Sabrina the Teenage Witch (episode: "Good Will Haunting"; Season 3, Episode 6) as "Guy Who Thinks He's Gary Owens", as well as reprising his role as Blue Falcon on an episode of Cartoon Network's Dexter's Laboratory: "Dyno-Might".

=== Latter years ===
In 2004, Owens co-wrote a book titled How to Make a Million Dollars With Your Voice (Or Lose Your Tonsils Trying). In his latter years, Owens was the promotional announcing voice for Antenna TV, an over-the-air digital network dedicated to classic shows of the past, like Three's Company, The Monkees, Adam-12 and Gidget.

== Personal life ==
Owens married Arleta Markell on June 26, 1956; they remained married for nearly sixty years until his death in February 2015. Together they had two sons, Scott and Chris.

== Death ==
Owens died on February 12, 2015, at age 80, from complications due to Type 1 diabetes, a condition with which he was first diagnosed at the age of eight.

== Voice acting ==
Owens provided the voices for:

- The title character of Roger Ramjet.
- The narrator for the cartoon series The Perils of Penelope Pitstop.
- The Space Ghost for the original Space Ghost (1966–1968) cartoon series (credited as Gary Owen) and on Space Stars (1981–1982). He later reprised his role in a 2011 episode of Batman: The Brave and the Bold titled "Bold Beginnings!".
- The announcer for Garfield and Friends.
- The narrator of Dr. Phibes Rises Again.
- The narrator in two episodes of Dinosaurs
- Powdered Toast Man of The Ren & Stimpy Show.
- Captain Squash on Bobby's World.
- The title character of Inspector Gadget in one of several versions of the pilot episode.
- Cartoon characters in various letter-of-the-alphabet cartoons on Sesame Street.
- The narrator for the "Secret Drawing" cartoon series on Sesame Street.
- Dirk Niblick of the Math Brigade on PBS's Square One Television.
- A substitute announcer for Bill Nye the Science Guy.
- The announcer and Principal in two episodes of 2 Stupid Dogs
- The Blue Falcon in Dynomutt, Dog Wonder. (He later reprised the role in both an episode of Dexter's Laboratory and an episode of Johnny Bravo.)
- Badly Animated Man in Raw Toonage.
- Commander Ulysses Feral in SWAT Kats: The Radical Squadron.
- The narrator for the pilot episode of Adventures of Sonic the Hedgehog.
- The narrator for the U.S. commercial of Super Mario Land 2: 6 Golden Coins.
- Opening narration for Buzz Lightyear of Star Command.
- The voice of Nick / The Dark Talon from the episode of Teamo Supremo.
- The voice of Cy from the Galactica 1980 episode The Return of Starbuck.
- The announcer and himself for an episode of Space Ghost Coast to Coast.
- The 1950s-styled Batman in The New Batman Adventures episode Legends of the Dark Knight.
- The announcer for Superhuman Samurai Syber-Squad.
- The voice of the Antenna TV promotions (2011–2015), intoning Vintage...without the funny smell.
- Namor in the "7 Little Superheroes" episode of Spider-Man and His Amazing Friends.

He also narrated or announced dozens of other cartoons, as well as the fourth and sixth installments of the Space Quest PC game series.

== Trademarks ==
When appearing "in character" on camera as "Gary Owens, the announcer", Owens held his right hand up to his right ear while speaking into a gimbaled boom microphone. This was done in imitation of the announcers in the early days of radio, who had to rely upon the acoustic feedback of their cupped hand to hear how they sounded to the audience. Owens used this as a running gag and gave various outlandish reasons for this pose: On his KMPC radio show in the late 1960s and early 1970s, he claimed that this was because a piece of shrapnel took off his ear during the war; sometimes it would come loose and he had to hold it on; at other times he said that he was given a wooden ear, and was keeping the termites warm. This gag was later parodied by Les Lye on the Canadian children's sketch-comedy show You Can't Do That on Television.

Owens coined the phrase "Beautiful downtown Burbank", which was later used on Laugh-In and The Tonight Show.

His trademark self-introduction was "This is Gary Owens, friend of those who want no friends, going places and losing things", or occasionally, "Hello, and also hi; but not necessarily in that order", as a shorter version.

== Blast from the Past ==
In 2001, TV Land released two computer games titled Blast from the Past, hosted by Owens and featuring other TV celebrities including Florence Henderson, Ed Asner, Davy Jones, Bob Denver, Don Adams, Barbara Eden, Todd Bridges, Alan Young, and Marion Ross, among others. The games spoofed a game show and the prize for winners was an interview with the chosen celebrity the contestant selected at the start of the game. (Players can choose Owens as a celebrity if they wish).

== Filmography ==
=== Film ===
Year	Title	Role	Notes
1961	The Naked Witch	Prologue Narrator	
1965	McHale's Navy Joins the Air Force	Enlisted Man	Uncredited
1966	The Last of the Secret Agents	Voice	Uncredited
1968	The Love Bug	Announcer (voice)	
1972	Dr. Phibes Rises Again	Narrator (voice)	
1975	The Prisoner of Second Avenue	Radio Newscaster (voice)	Uncredited
1978	Return from Witch Mountain	Newscaster (voice)	Uncredited
1978	Coming Attractions	Narrator (voice)	
1982	Buyer Be Wise	Narrator (voice)	Uncredited, Short film
1983	Hysterical	TV Announcer (voice)	
1985	National Lampoon's European Vacation	"Pig in a Poke" Announcer (voice)	Uncredited
1985	Dinosaurs, Dinosaurs, Dinosaurs	Himself	Documentary
1988	Destroyer	Game Show Announcer (voice)	
1989	How I Got into College	Sports Announcer (voice)	
1990	Kill Crazy	The Sheriff	
1990	Diggin' Up Business	Minister	
1996	Spy Hard	M.C.	
1998	Border to Border	Mr. Kirby	
1999	Muppets from Space	UFO Mania Announcer (voice)	Uncredited
2001	Major Damage	Narrator (voice)	
2002	Jane White Is Sick & Twisted	TV Announcer (voice)	
2002	Frank McKlusky, C.I.	Announcer (voice)	
2004	Comic Book: The Movie	Himself	
2013	I Know That Voice	Himself	Documentary

=== Television ===
Year	Title	Role	Notes
1965	McHale's Navy	The Photographer, The 1st Sailor	Episodes: "The Seven Faces of Ensign Parker", "A Star Falls on Taratupa"
1965	Roger Ramjet	Roger Ramjet (voice)	156 episodes
1965–1966	The Munsters	Zombo's Announcer, Dick Willet	Episodes: "Will Success Spoil Herman Munster?", "Zombo"
1966	Summer Fun	Henry	Episode: "McNab's Lab"
1966–1967	Green Hornet	Newscaster, Commentator	8 episodes
1966–1967	Batman	Voice on Radio, T.V. Announcer	3 episodes
1966–1968	Space Ghost	Space Ghost, Narrator (voices)	20 episodes
1967	Mr. Traffic	Announcer (voice)	Episode: "I Can't Fly"
1968	Sally Sargent	Blake Jameson, Narrator (voices)	Television short
1968–1973	Rowan & Martin's Laugh-In	Announcer, Himself	134 episodes
1969	I Dream of Jeannie	Himself	Episode: "The Biggest Star in Hollywood"
1969	Sesame Street Pitch Reel	Unknown role (voice)	
1969–1990	Sesame Street	The Man from Alphabet, Today's Secret Drawing Announcer, various characters	13 episodes
1973	Barnaby Jones	Gary Michaels	Episode: "Twenty Million Alibis"
1974	Out to Lunch	Announcer (voice)	Television film
1975	Get Christie Love!	TV Reporter	Episode: "Murder on High C"
1976	The Scooby-Doo/Dynomutt Hour	Blue Falcon (voice)	
1976–1977	Dynomutt, Dog Wonder	Blue Falcon (voice)	20 episodes
1977	Man from Atlantis	Announcer (voice)	Episode: "Man O'War"
1977	Scooby's All-Star Laff-A-Lympics	Blue Falcon (voice)	
1977–1980	Captain Caveman and the Teen Angels	Narrator (voice)	40 episodes
1978	Yogi's Space Race	Narrator (voice)	7 episodes
1979–1983	Legends of the Superheroes	Narrator (voice)	Episodes: "The Challenge", "The Roast"
1979–1983	The Wonderful World of Disney	Narrator (voice)	Episodes: "Baseball Fever", "Pluto and His Friends", "Ferdinand the Bull and Mickey"
1980	Galactica 1980	Cy	Episode: "The Return of Starbuck"
1981	Space Stars	Space Ghost (voice)	11 episodes
1981	Superbman: The Other Movie	Short film	
1982	No Soap, Radio	Skit Performer	4 episodes
1982	Get It Right: Following Directions with Goofy	Narrator (voice)	Short film; Uncredited
1983	Breakaway	Host, Announcer	Unknown episodes
1983	Inspector Gadget	Inspector Gadget (voice)	Episode: "Pilot"
1984	The Mighty Orbots	Narrator (voice)	Episode: "Magnetic Menace"
1984	Vacationing with Mickey and Friends	Proprietor of the Let's Get Away From It All Travel Agency	Television film
1984	The Roots of Goofy	Host	Television film
1985	Simon & Simon	Sanfred Thompson	Episode: "Down-Home County Blues"
1985–1987	Yogi's Treasure Hunt	Narrator (voice)	13 episodes
1987	Sledge Hammer!	Sledge's Neighbours, Radio Announcer, Series Announcer	Episodes: "A Clockwork Hammer", "Wild About Hammer"
1987	DTV Monster Hits	Announcer (voice)	Television film
1988–1991	Square One Television	Lt. Dirk Niblick (voice)	5 episodes
1988–1994	Garfield and Friends	Announcer, Instructor (voices)	42 episodes
1989	Night Court	Bobby Baumgarner	Episode: "Auntie Maim"
1989	The Super Mario Bros. Super Show!	Willy White (voice)	Episode: "Home Radio/Elvin Lives"
1990–1992	Tom & Jerry Kids	Additional voices	2 episodes
1990–1998	Bobby's World	Captain Squash (voice)	23 episodes
1992	Dinosaurs	Narrator (voice)	Episodes: "Nuts to War: Part 1", "Nuts to War: Part 2"
1992	Defenders of Dynatron City	Announcer (voice)	Television short
1992	Goof Troop	Mr. Hammerhead (voice)	Episode: "Date with Destiny"
1992	Raw Toonage	Badly Animated Man (voice)	1 episode
1992–1996	The Ren & Stimpy Show	Powdered Toast Man, Announcer, Charles Globe, Player (voices)	7 episodes
1992–1996	Eek! The Cat	Reporter, Announcer, Additional voices	30 episodes
1993	Adventures of Sonic the Hedgehog	Narrator (voice)	Episode" "Pilot"
1993	2 Stupid Dogs	Principal Schneider, Johnny the Announcer (voices)	2 episodes
1993–1994	SWAT Kats: The Radical Squadron	Commander Ulysses Feral, Commander Feral, Cmdr. Ulysses Feral (voices)	22 episodes
1994	Fantastic Four: The Animated Series	Gary Owens, Bystander #1 (voices)	2 episodes
1994	Superhuman Samurai Syber-Squad	Opening Narration (voice)	53
1994	Love & War	Announcer (voice)	Episode: "Ten Cents a Dance"
1994–1995	Skeleton Warriors	Additional voices	11 episodes
1995	The Twisted Tales of Felix the Cat	Additional voices	2 episodes
1995	Aaahh!!! Real Monsters	Clown, Broadcaster #2 (voices)	Episode "A Room with No Viewfinder/Krumm Rises to the Top"
1995–1997	America's Funniest Home Videos	Announcer (voice)	Reality television series
1996	Space Ghost Coast to Coast	Announcer (voice)	Episode: "Late Show"
1996	The Mask	Channel, Raymond Neilsen (voices)	Episode: "Channel Surfing'"
1997	What a Cartoon!	Announcer, Commander (voices)	Episode: "Dino in the Great Egg Scape"
1997	101 Dalmatians: The Series	TV Announcer (voice)	Episode: "Tic Track Toe/Lucky All-Star"
1998	Sabrina, the Teenage Witch	Guy Who Thinks He's Gary Owens	Episode: "Good Will Haunting"
1998	Oh Yeah! Cartoons	MC, Fisherman #1 (voices)	Episode: "Youngstar 3"
1998	The New Batman Adventures	50s Batman (voice)	Episode: "Legend of the Dark Knight"
1998–2003	Dexter's Laboratory	Blue Falcon, TV Announcer	2 episodes
1999	That '70s Show	Announcer, Narrator (voices)	4 episodes
2000	Buzz Lightyear of Star Command	Opening Narration (voice)	6 episodes
2002	Teamo Supremo	Nick / The Dark Talon	Episode: "The Grandfather Show"
2002	Ren and Stimpy Rocks	Unknown role	Episode: "Hard Times for Haggis"
2004	Johnny Bravo	Blue Falcon (voice)	Episode: "Johnny Makeover/Back on Shaq"
2011	Batman: The Brave and the Bold	Space Ghost (voice)	Episode: "Bold Beginnings!"

=== Video games ===
Year	Title	Role	Notes
1991	Space Quest IV: Roger Wilco and the Time Rippers	Narrator	
1995	Space Quest 6: The Spinal Frontier	Narrator	
1996	Nickelodeon 3D Movie Maker	Powdered Toast Man	

== Bibliography ==
- Owens, Gary (1973). The (what to do while you're holding the) Phone Book. Jeremy P. Tarcher Inc. ISBN 978-0874770155.
- Owens, Gary; Lenburg, Jeff (2004). How to Make a Million Dollars with Your Voice (Or Lose Your Tonsils Trying). McGraw-Hill Education. ISBN 978-0071424103.

Preceded by Role originator	Actors portraying Space Ghost; 1966–1968, 1981–1982, 2011	Succeeded by Andy Merrill

Preceded by Ernie Anderson; 1989–1995	Announcer for America's Funniest Home Videos; 1995–1997	Succeeded by Jess Harnell; 1998–present
