= Space Quest III =

1989 video game

Space Quest III: The Pirates of Pestulon
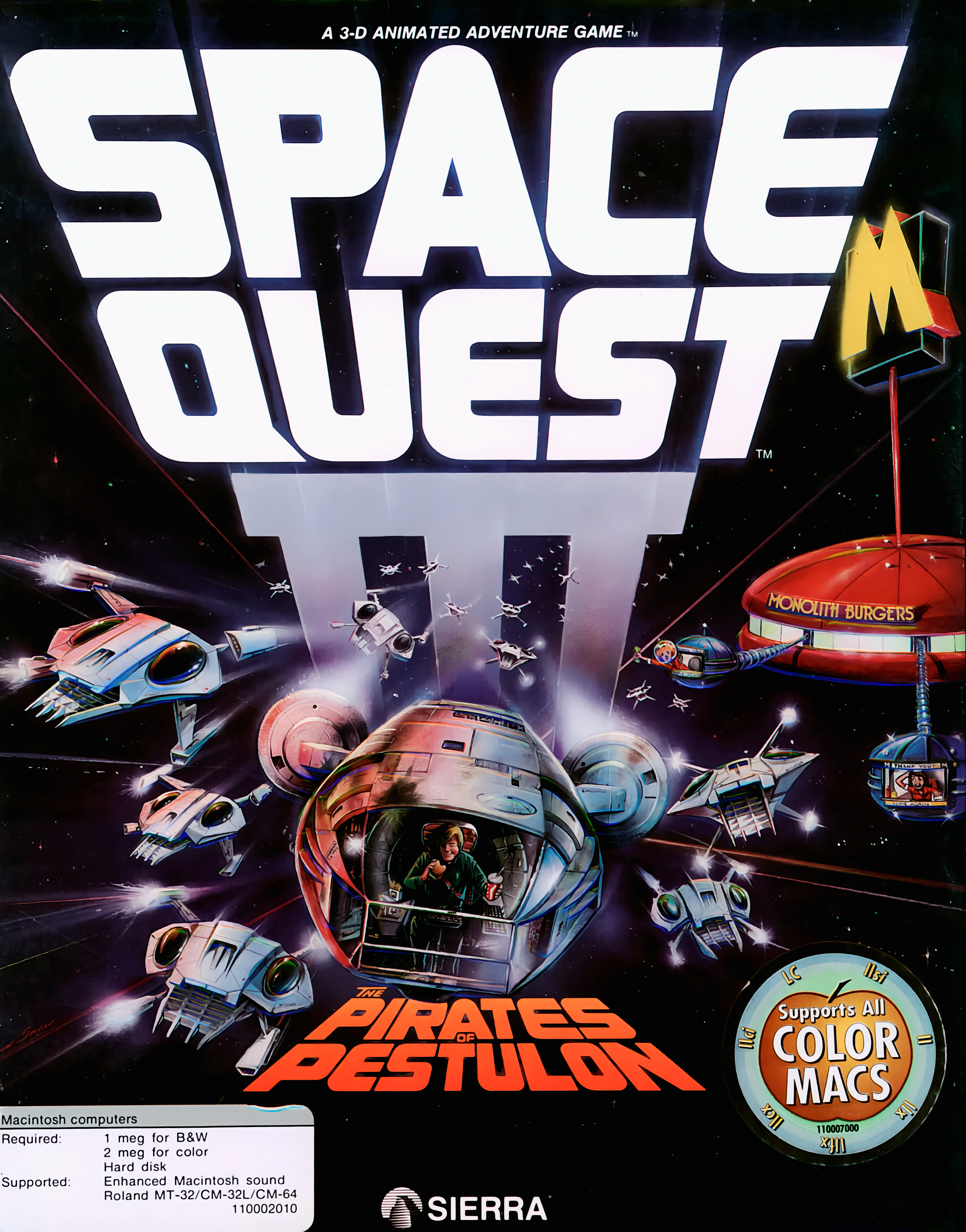
- Cover art by John Shaw
- Developer: Sierra On-Line
- Publisher: Sierra On-Line
- Designers: Mark Crowe; Scott Murphy
- Programmers: Scott Murphy; Doug Oldfield; Ken Koch; Chris Smith
- Writers: Mark Crowe; Scott Murphy
- Composer: Bob Siebenberg
- Series: Space Quest
- Engine: SCI0
- Platforms: Amiga, Atari ST, MS-DOS, Classic Mac OS
- Release: March 24, 1989
- Genre: Adventure
- Mode: Single-player

Space Quest III: The Pirates of Pestulon is graphic adventure game developed and published by Sierra On-Line. It was released in 1989 for the Amiga, Atari ST, and MS-DOS, then in 1991 for Classic Mac OS. It is the third game in the Space Quest series. Players assume the role of Roger Wilco, a lowly space janitor, who becomes involved in rescuing a pair of programmers from a sinister video game company. The game received positive reviews from critics, and contributed further to the series' commercial success for Sierra. The next game in the series, Space Quest IV, was released in 1991.

== Plot ==
A scene from the garbage freighter, showing some typical Space Quest science fiction allusions: wrecks of a TIE fighter, an ACME Rocket, and the Jupiter 2 spacecraft.

Space Quest III takes place in a universe which parodies notable science-fiction franchises such as Star Trek and Star Wars. The game continues the story of Roger Wilco, a simple janitor who has saved his homeworld twice from disaster. Following the events of Space Quest II, lowly janitor Roger Wilco is in cryogenic sleep, while his escape pod drifts through space. An automated garbage freighter brings it aboard, where Roger awakens. Forced to find a way out, he discovers a derelict spaceship, the Aluminum Mallard, in the freighter's garbage hold. After repairing the ship, Roger pilots it out of the freighter. Visiting the desert planet of Phleebhut, he finds himself confronted by an Arnold Schwarzenegger-like android terminator, who was sent to deal with him for failing to pay for a whistle in the previous game. However, Roger outwits him and obtains his invisibility belt.

At an orbital Monolith Burger station, Roger comes across a hidden message in an arcade game he plays, stating that its programmers (known as Two Guys) were abducted by ScumSoft, a sinister video game company on the Planet Pestulon - owned by Elmo Pug, leader of the "Pirates of Pestulon". Roger learns the programmers need rescuing, as ScumSoft intends to use them to design awful games to flood the galaxy. Deciding to rescue them, he visits a lava moon orbiting the planet Pestulon to neutralize a shield generator. Heading to the planet's surface, Roger uses his invisibility belt to infiltrate the base, and secures a disguise in the form of janitor overalls.

Exploring the company, Roger tracks down the Two Guys, but is trapped by Elmo, who forces him into an arena battle using giant Mecha robots (based on the Rock 'Em Sock 'Em Robots game). Roger overcomes Elmo, defeating him and escapes with the Two Guys. After fighting off several ScumSoft space ships, the trio realize that the warp drive is broken. After tinkering with it, and with no warp course set in, the trio are warped into a parallel dimension via a black hole, ending up before the planet Earth. Roger delivers the two game designers to Sierra On-Line's president, Ken Williams, before departing the planet to return home after being turned down for a janitorial job.

== Gameplay ==
PC versions of the game support mouse movement and a new, heavily improved text parser. Mouse movement was still in a primitive state at the time of the game's release, so Roger is unable to automatically find his way around obstacles in the game world, instead stopping if he encounters a barrier. Computer mice were relatively new at the time, and Sierra's mouse movement would greatly improve in subsequent games.

=== Astro Chicken ===
Astro Chicken is an arcade minigame in Space Quest III. Gameplay consists of attempting to land a chicken on a trampoline. The mechanics of the game are similar to those of Lunar Lander, with the exception that the chicken rebounds unharmed if it strikes the trampoline too forcefully. Achieving a high score reveals a hidden distress message left by the Two Guys from Andromeda. The Astro Chicken theme music is a variation on Chicken Reel, a traditional folk song best known for its use in animated cartoons. Sierra released the Astro Chicken minigame as a demo to promote Space Quest III.

== Development ==
Space Quest III was developed using an early version of Sierra's SCI engine. Unlike the series' previous installments, the player is no longer able to choose the protagonist's name. From this game onward, the character is known as Roger Wilco, the name that had previously been the default.

It features music composed by Supertramp drummer Bob Siebenberg, and was one of the first games to support the new Sound Blaster sound card. Sound effects include digitized audio sampling, such as the voice of Roger saying "Where am I?" during the introduction. The digitized effects can be heard in the Tandy, Amiga and Macintosh versions of the game. Though Space Quest III was designed to utilize the Sound Blaster's ability to play digital samples, the inclusion of an incorrect audio driver left the effects unavailable to IBM PC users with the Sound Blaster card.

The game features a scene at ScumSoft where parody versions of Sierra's president, Ken Williams, and director of operations, Rick Cavin, are depicted as overseers cracking whips over software developers in cubicles. Murphy designed this scene to satirize the negative trends he observed at Sierra at the time.

Space Quest III was released on March 24, 1989.

Several fan remake attempts were cancelled over the years. In 2003, a non-playable VGA demo was released. In 2023, a fan remake titled Space Quest 3D was released.

== Reception ==
C&VG gave the Atari ST version of Space Quest III a score of 83%, calling it "enjoyable and addictive", and Dragon gave the game 4 out of 5 stars. The Macintosh & PC/MS-DOS versions of the game were also given 4 out of 5 stars. Compute! praised the game's graphics and sound card audio, stating that they were the best of the series. STart also praised the ST version's graphics and sound. While warning that Space Quest III was "essentially a text adventure" with syntax guessing and frequent saved game reloading, the magazine described it as "not-too-difficult" and suitable for those new to adventure games. Computer Gaming World gave the game a positive review, noting improvements in the presentation and action sequences over its predecessors. In 1989 the magazine gave it a Special Award for Achievement in Sound, and in 1996 listed the player's body parts being sold at a butcher shop as #2 on its list of "the 15 best ways to die in computer gaming".

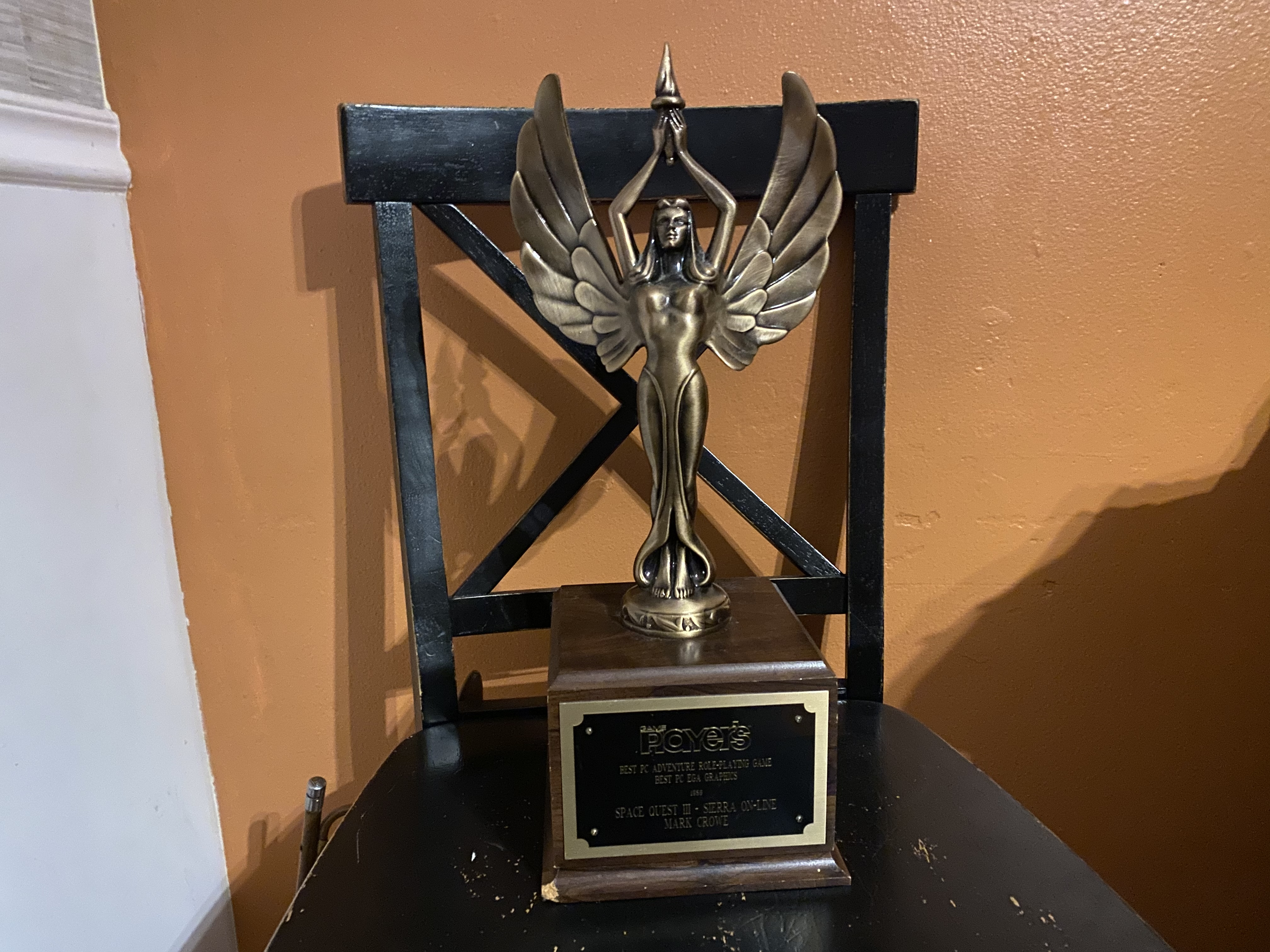
Game Player's award for Best PC EGA Graphics – 1989. Presented to Mark Crowe

The editors of Game Player's PC Strategy Guide gave Space Quest III their 1989 "Best PC Adventure Role-Playing Game" and "Best PC EGA Graphics" awards.

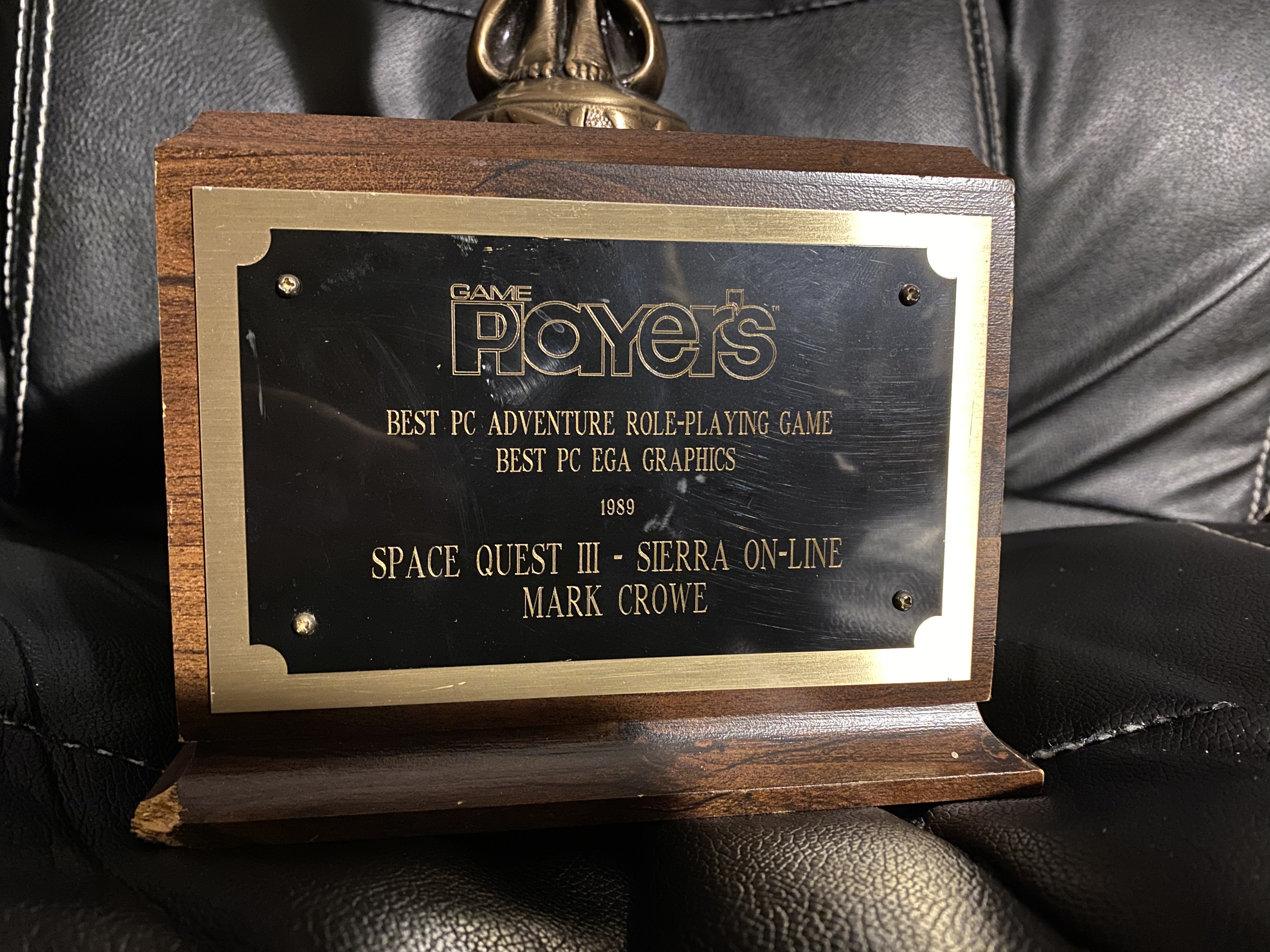
Close up of the Plaque of the Game Player's award for Best PC EGA Graphics -1989. Presented to Mark Crowe

John Scott of Games International called the game "Brilliant! The graphics are super." He also thought the musical soundtrack was "the best I have yet encountered in any computer game." He noted the streak of humour running through the game, saying, "sometimes it's warped, sometimes cruel, but it's always funny." He did criticize the long loading times for each screen, and the computer's habit of prompting a disk change before the save sequence was finished. Nevertheless, he gave both the gameplay and graphics an excellent rating of 9, saying, "I think you'll like this. I did. A lot."

According to Sierra On-Line, combined sales of the Space Quest series surpassed 1.2 million units by the end of March 1996.
