= Quest VI =

Quest 6 or Quest VI may refer to:

- Dragon Quest VI, a role-playing video game
- King's Quest VI, sixth installment in the King's Quest series of graphic adventure games
- Space Quest 6, a 1995 graphic adventure game
