= Space Quest II =

1987 video game

Space Quest II: Chapter II – Vohaul's Revenge
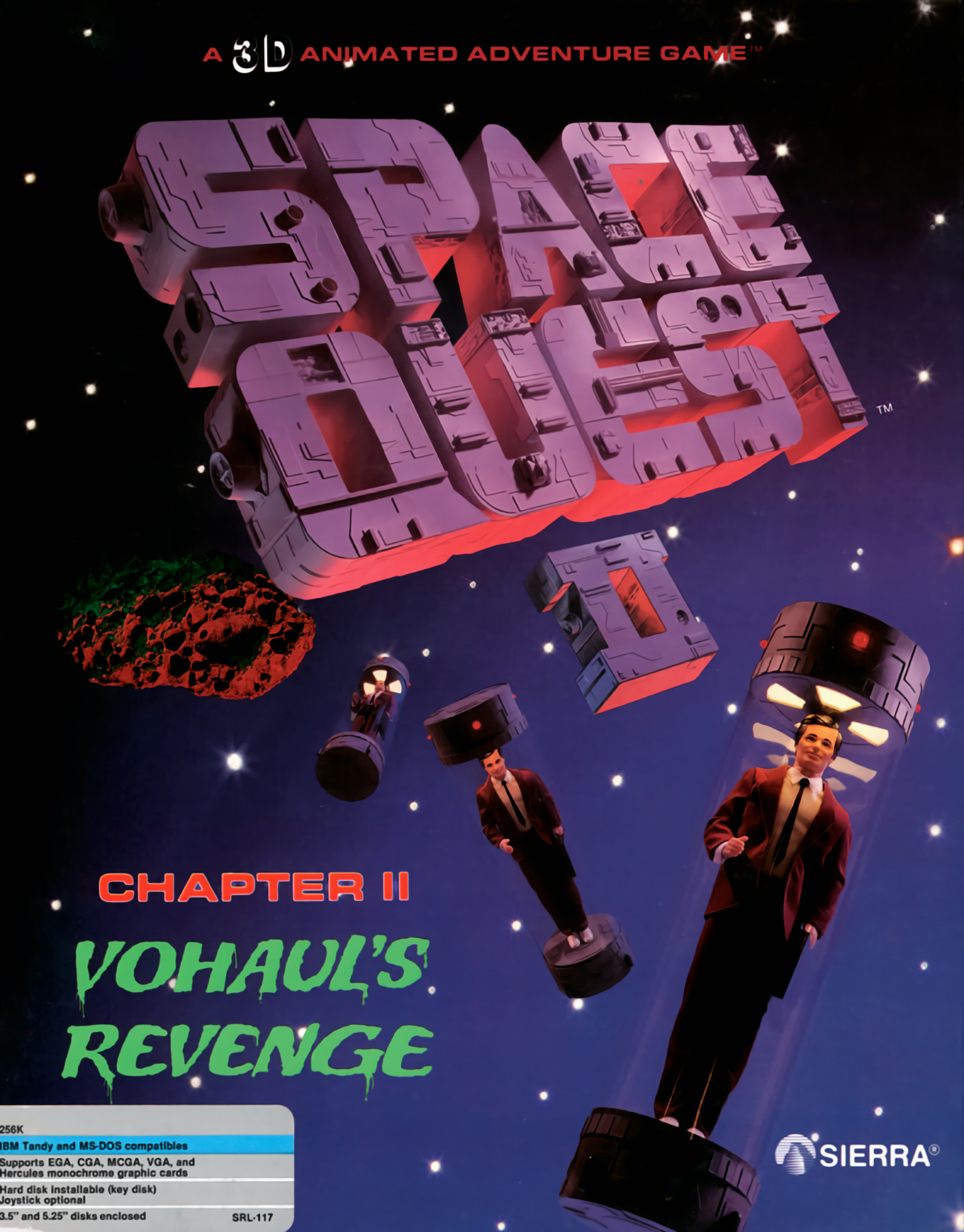
- Developer: Sierra On-Line
- Publisher: Sierra On-Line
- Designers: Scott Murphy; Mark Crowe
- Programmer: Scott Murphy
- Artist: Mark Crowe
- Series: Space Quest
- Engine: AGI
- Platforms: DOS, Macintosh, Apple II, Apple IIGS, Amiga, Atari ST
- Release: November 14, 1987
- Genre: Adventure
- Mode: Single-player

Space Quest II: Chapter II – Vohaul's Revenge (commonly known as Space Quest II: Vohaul's Revenge) is a graphic adventure game released on November 14, 1987 by Sierra On-Line. It is the sequel to Space Quest I, again using Sierra's AGI game engine, and sees players assume the role of Roger Wilco, a simple janitor who is soon drawn into a new adventure involving thwarting the culprit behind the events of the last game.

The game was a commercial success from launch, receiving significant praise by critics from more improved puzzles and a greater scope, but with some criticism over some problematic elements. The game was followed on by a sequel, Space Quest III, in 1989. In 2011, a fan remake of Space Quest II was launched, featuring improvements in graphics and gameplay, while including new animation sequences and a full voice cast for characters.

== Plot ==
=== Setting ===
Space Quest II takes place within a universe that notably parodies prominent science-fiction brands such as Star Wars and Star Trek. The story takes place several months after the events of Space Quest I, with players assuming the role of Roger Wilco, a janitor who saved his homeworld of Xenon from disaster by destroying a potent weapon known as the Star Generator and killing the Sariens that stole it. A comic is included in the manual to explain to the player what events have occurred since Space Quest I.

=== Story ===
The player types the parser command "search man" after crash-landing on Labion (Atari ST)

Several months after saving his home world of Xenon from the dangers of the Sariens, Roger Wilco accepts a position as Head Janitor aboard Xenon Orbital Station 4 as his fame fades into obscurity. Contacted by his superiors to clean up a mess on a recently arrived shuttle, Roger finds himself ambushed in the station's hangar bay, where he is knocked out and abducted by unknown assailants. When he regains consciousness, he finds himself a prisoner on an asteroid base orbiting the jungle planet of Labion, run by Sludge Vohaul – a former scientist of Xenon. Vohaul reveals he was the creator of the Star Generator, but was exiled by Xenon when he sought to have the technology used as a weapon rather than for peace.

Eager for revenge, he attempted to use the Sariens to steal the generator, but was infuriated when Roger thwarted this. Despite the setback, he reveals he is in the process of creating an army of cloned insurance salesmen to help him eradicate life on Xenon. To punish Roger for his actions, Vohaul has him sent to his mines on Labion as a slave. However, whilst being transported over the jungles, a malfunction on the transport craft causes it to crash, killing Roger's guards. Escaping detection by Vohaul's goons, Roger makes his way through the jungle to the landing pad he arrived at, and steals a shuttle. However, Vohaul hijacks its controls, bring him back to the asteroid base to keep him from escaping.

With little choice, Roger sneaks around the base, attempting to find some way out. Instead of finding an escape route, he finds himself entering Vohaul's control room, where the scientist decides to keep him imprisoned more permanently. Shrunk down in size, and trapped in a glass jar, Roger manages to break out, and infiltrates a life-support machine that has helped to keep Vohaul alive over the years. Disconnecting it, Roger kills Vohaul, before getting himself restored to his normal size. Activating a self-destruct sequence, Roger makes his way through the base, finds an escape pod, and flees as the base is destroyed. Finding the pod cannot keep him alive forever, Roger enters cryo sleep to conserve oxygen while awaiting someone to rescue him, as the capsule drifts across space.

== Reception ==
"Lovers of challenge, come hither! Sierra On-Line has the game for you", PC Magazine wrote in 1988. The magazine warned of Space Quest II's difficulty ("don't kid yourself by thinking you'll get by without the Hint Book") but praised its fun when playing with others. It approved of the "terrific" EGA graphics but said many details were not visible with CGA graphics. Computer Gaming World noted, "Though the game is similar to the original Space Quest, the addition of more detailed animation, more difficult puzzles, an improved parser (hurrah!), and greater scope makes a good game even better". The review criticized some objects' unclear descriptions, particularly problematic with CGA. It also stated that the hidden location of the gem was "illogical", as the entrance to the underwater cave is not shown on the screen. Antic warned of the difficulty, stating that the ST version "is trickier than the original and graphically superior". Macworld wrote that "as in the original game, Space Quest II succeeds with the humor of its animation and scripting".

Space Quest II was listed number four in Sierra's Top 5 Bestsellers. Therefore, it can be assumed Space Quest II sold over 100,000 copies, thus earning the SPA (Software Publishers Association) Gold Medal. According to Sierra On-Line, combined sales of the Space Quest series surpassed 1.2 million units by the end of March 1996.

== Remake ==
Infamous Adventures announced on April 1, 2007 that they were remaking Space Quest II in the style of past VGA remakes, releasing screenshots and a demo along with the announcement. The remake was released on New Year's Eve 2011, featuring a full-voice pack and extended content.
