= SQ6 =

SQ6 may refer to:

- Space Quest 6, a video game
- SQ6, an early mixtape released by Lil Wayne in 2003
- Singapore Airlines Flight 006, air crash in 2000
