= Quest V =

Quest 5 or Quest V may refer to:

- Dragon Quest V, a role-playing video game
- King's Quest V, fifth installment in the King's Quest series of graphic adventure games
- Space Quest V, a 1993 graphic adventure game
