= Space Quest IV =

1991 video game

Space Quest IV: Roger Wilco and the Time Rippers
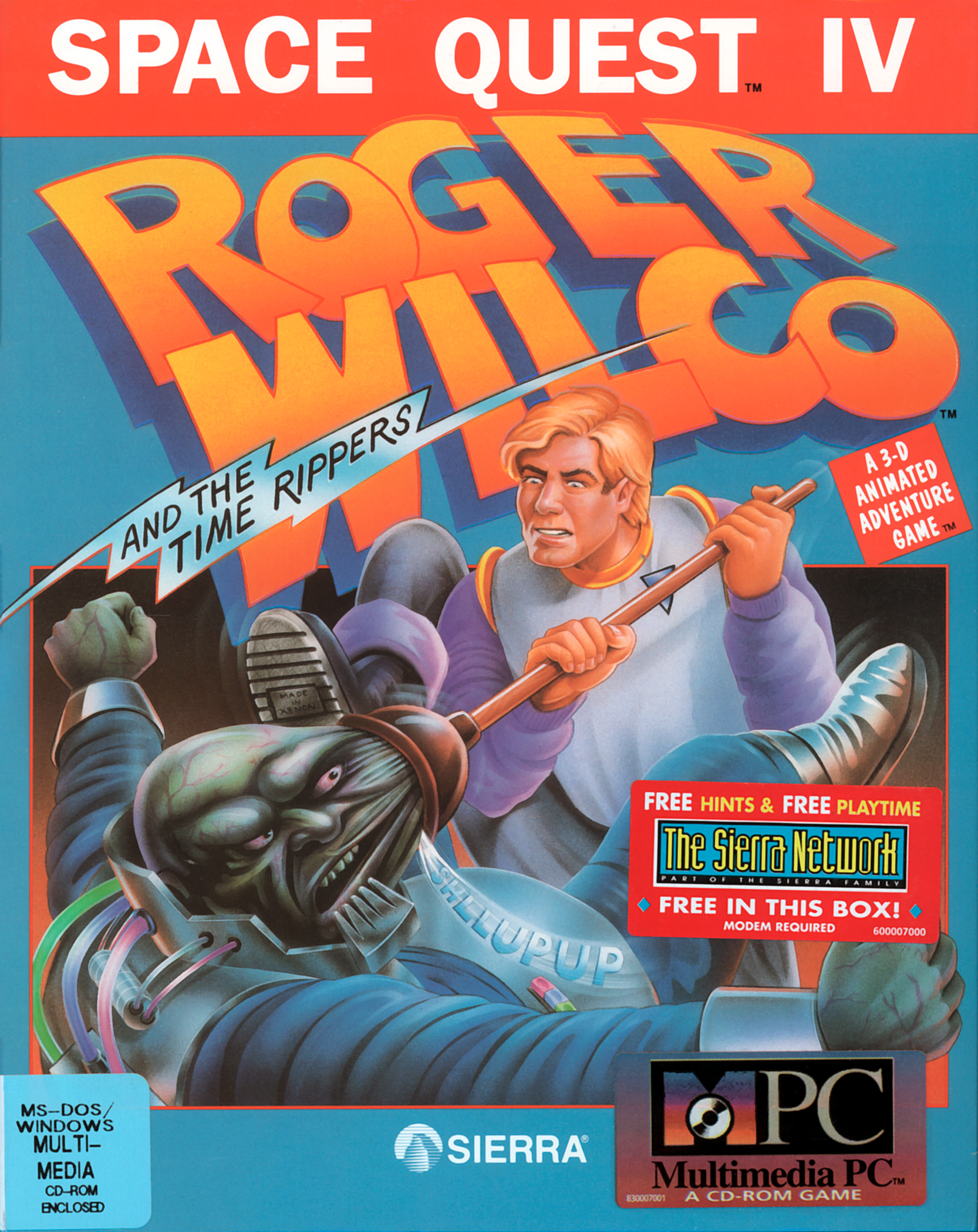
- Cover art by Terry Robinson
- Developer: Sierra On-Line
- Publisher: Sierra On-Line
- Director: Bill Davis (creative)
- Designers: Scott Murphy; Mark Crowe
- Programmers: Scott Murphy; Doug Oldfield
- Artist: Mark Crowe
- Composers: Mark Seibert; Ken Allen
- Series: Space Quest
- Engine: SCI
- Platforms: MS-DOS, Windows, Classic Mac OS, Amiga, PC-98
- Release: March 1991: MS-DOS, Mac; 1992: Amiga, PC-98
- Genre: Adventure
- Mode: Single-player

Space Quest IV: Roger Wilco and the Time Rippers is a graphic adventure game developed and published by Sierra On-Line. It is the fourth entry in the Space Quest series. The game was released on floppy disks in March 1991 for MS-DOS and Classic Mac OS, and on CD-ROM in December 1992 with speech support. Amiga and PC-98 versions were also published in 1992. The player assumes the role of Roger Wilco, who is thrust into a new adventure across time and space where he must thwart the plans of an old foe that is seeking revenge against him.

The game uses 256 color hand painted graphics, motion capture animation, and a point-and-click interface. The overall cost of the game was far greater than previous titles, but proved a commercial success, receiving positive reviews from critics for its humour, voice cast, and presentation. A sequel, Space Quest V, was released in 1993.

== Gameplay ==
In contrast to the first three games, Space Quest IV uses a point-and-click interface, similar in function to that of King's Quest V. In the game, these actions can be used to interact with objects to either examine them, talk to them, use/pick them up, and taste and smell them (the latter two mainly for comedic purposes). Objects can be examined in the inventory and selected as an action to use in the environments. Like other Sierra games and previous games, the player will need to deal with deadly situations quickly to avoid a game over sequence.

Scott Murphy preferred keeping the original parser interface in Space Quest IV, believing it added depth to the game. During development, he and his co-designer Mark Crowe were asked by president Ken Williams and creative director Bill Davis to consider adopting point-and-click. Despite their preference for the parser, management later overruled their decision, emphasizing the company's strategy to maintain a consistent point-and-click interface across its modern games portfolio.

=== Ms. Astro Chicken ===
Ms. Astro Chicken: Flight of the Pullet is a video game embedded within the Latex Babes of Estros portion of the game, in a mall arcade. It is a sequel of sorts to Astro Chicken, an arcade game that appeared in Space Quest III. The game's name is a parody of the actual arcade game Ms. Pac-Man. The Astro Chicken theme music is a variation on the Chicken Reel, a traditional folk song best known for its use in animated cartoons.

In the game, the player controls a flying chicken, whose enemies include flying squirrels, windpumps, shotgun-wielding hunters and hunting dogs. Dropping eggs on enemies immobilizes them and increases the player's score. After playing the game for a while, the arcade cabinet explodes, though this has no effect on the player or broader game.

== Plot ==
=== Setting ===
Space Quest IV takes place in a universe that parodies notable science-fiction franchises. The story itself parodies the game's numbering system as it delves into time-travel. Players assume the role of Roger Wilco, a lowly janitor who has been on three adventures and is now seeking to head home, only to find himself travelling between the past and the future to thwart a new threat.

=== Story ===
Following the events of Space Quest III, lowly janitor Roger Wilco is heading back to his homeworld of Xenon, aboard the Aluminum Mallard. Stopping at a bar for drinks, and retelling his heroics to the customers, Roger is approached by two androids. Taken outside by them, they reveal themselves to be under the employment of Sludge Vohaul, the villain of Space Quest II, who has been reborn in the future and is now seeking revenge on him. Before the androids kill him, two soldiers rescue Roger, one of whom opens a rift in time and instructs him to escape through it. Travelling through it, Roger winds up on Xenon in the near future, devastated by a major disaster (in which the game claims it's Space Quest XII: Vohaul's Revenge II).

Exploring the ruins of the planet's main city, Roger finds a recording which reveals that Xenon developed an AI supercomputer to run everything, but that it was infected with a virus, Vohaul's mind digitized, that waged war on the inhabitants, killing or enslaving most of the population. Finding he must stop him, Roger sneaks a ride to Vohaul's base, and steals a time-travel ship to find some way of combatting the problem. Taking himself back several years, he winds up on the Planet Estros during Space Quest X: Latex Babes of Estros (a parody of Infocom's game Leather Goddesses of Phobos), where he encounters his future ex-girlfriend. After rescuing her from trouble, he joins them on a shopping trip, acquiring further items to assist in his quest.

After Vohaul's androids track him down, Roger outwits them and steals their time-travel ship, proceeding to track down additional items (including a visit back to Space Quest I), before eventually returning to Xenon. Infiltrating Vohaul's base, Roger finds the soldier who rescued him is actually his son from the future, and that Vohaul captured him. After initiating the supercomputer's reformatting process, he proceeds to confront Vohaul. Defeating him and rescuing his son, Roger liberates Xenon once again, and inquires about his future. His son provides only minor details, including information on the woman whom he will have a child with. Learning he will not recall much of the adventure, Roger bids his son farewell, and returns to the present.

== Ports ==
An Atari ST version was announced via Sierra Online's magazine, Sierra News Magazine, but canceled.

== Reception ==
According to Sierra On-Line, combined sales of the Space Quest series surpassed 1.2 million units by the end of March 1996.

In 1991, Dragon gave the game 5 out of 5 stars. In 1992, they gave the Macintosh version of the game 5 out of 5 stars as well. Computer Gaming World's Charles Ardai stated in 1993 that "the CD-ROM version is even more filling than the original. It accentuates and improves all of the game's strong points", with the voice actors providing much better voice acting than in King's Quest V. While noting that the CD-ROM did not change the brevity of the gameplay, Ardai added that "there are better adventure games than Space Quest IV [but] there are few games that are more entertaining. Fewer still are improved so much in the transition to CD-ROM". He concluded that "Space Quest IV is the perfect multimedia game: it looks and sounds great and it offers an experience one could not get from a floppy-based game". In April 1994 the magazine said that the CD version's voices "bring Roger Wilco's campy world to life ... one of his finest and funniest adventures".

Jim Trunzo reviewed Space Quest IV in White Wolf #30 (Feb., 1992), rating it a 4 out of 5 and stated that "The game's comedic bent camouflages the underlying tenseness of the conflict between the good guys and the bad guys. Great futuristic graphics blend perfectly with the simplified game play to make Space Quest IV: Roger Wilco and the Time Rippers one of life's rare creatures - a successful sequel."

The Amiga release was not as well received as the original PC one, with a number of reviewers citing the poor quality of the conversion, and some Amiga magazines grading the game with a score as low as 19%.

In 1996, Computer Gaming World named Space Quest IV as the funniest game ever made. The editors wrote that it "transformed every sci-fi time-travel cliche with Gary Owens' voice ... providing the perfect comedic counterpoint."

In 2011, Adventure Gamers named Space Quest IV the 48th-best adventure game ever released.
