= Chicken Reel =

1910 dance tune with lyrics added in 1911

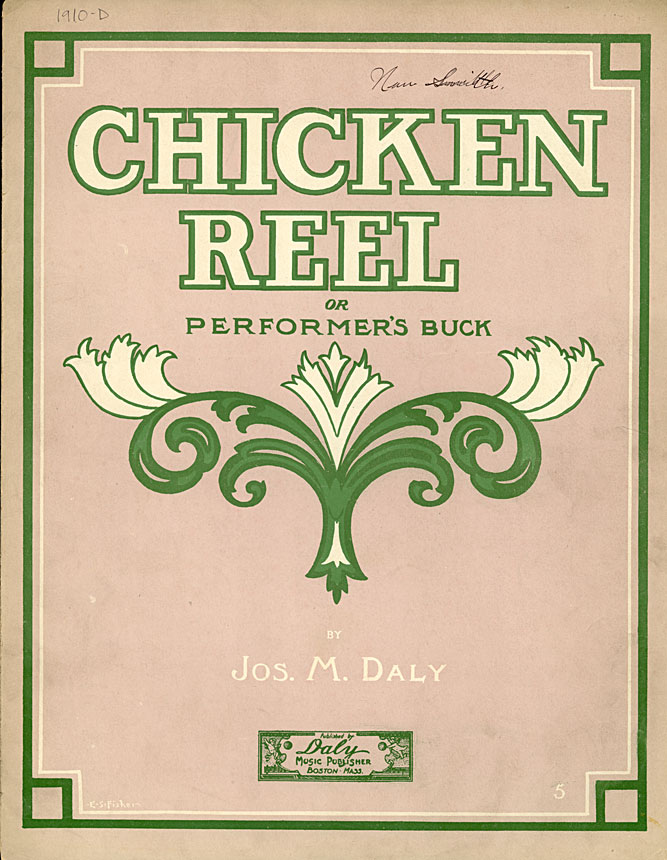
- Sheet music cover, 1910

Song
- Published: 1910
- Composer: Joseph M. Daly
- Lyricist: Joseph Mittenthal

"Chicken Reel"
"Chicken Reel/Turkey in the Straw medley" performed by the United States Air Force Band

"Chicken Reel" is a dance tune. It was composed and published in 1910 by Joseph M. (Michael) Daly (1883–1968), with copyright registered on October 7.. Joseph Mittenthal added lyrics three months later, and the texted version was copyrighted on January 12, 1911. It has long since entered the public domain.

Along with "Turkey in the Straw," "Chicken Reel" is one of the best-known poultry-related folk tunes. It is frequently found in early animated cartoons as a catchy tune used to represent farmyard activity, or a gathering of fowl. Originally composed as a novelty song, it has since passed into modern folk tradition. Today, the tune is usually played without the words, which were usually sung minstrel show style in stereotyped African-American vernacular.

Chicken Reel was made popular again years later by Les Paul who recorded the song as a catchy instrumental, whimsically mimicking chicken sounds on his guitar.

"Chicken Reel" was arranged for symphony orchestra by Leroy Anderson; his arrangement was recorded by Arthur Fiedler and the Boston Pops Orchestra in 1962. It also inspired Jean Wiener's Histoires sans paroles.

== Lyrics ==
The lyrics as written by Mittenthal:

Way down in Carolina where the sweet potatoes grow
There lives a dusky maiden by the name of Liza Snow
She used to go to parties where they'd always make her sing,
But say you ought to see that Baby do the pigeon wing.
They held a dancing contest and were goin' to give a prize
They all had on their finest and it now was up to Lize.
Just who was goin' to win it ev'rybody there could feel,
When Liza hollered to the band to play the Chicken Reel
Clear the crowd away
Tell the band to play
When you hear me say "GO" My honey

Chorus:
Oh, you Chicken Reel, how you make me feel
Say it's really so entrancin'
Who could really keep from dancin',
That's the music sweet, like the chicken meat
Give it to me with the dressin'
I don't need no dancin' lesson
Put all the other fine selections right away
That is the only tune I want to hear you play
When I get married if there's music I will say
"Hey boss keep a-playin' Chicken Reel all day"

One night when from a party she was walkin' home with Bill
Now he's a steady feller and the night was dark and still
It seems he sto[l]e a chicken and when Liza heard of that,
She said I'm gonna wear it on my go-to-meetin' hat.
I guess you're goin' crazy answered William with a smile,
But Liza said "Go on you haven't heard the latest style."
When first she wore it out the people asked her to explain
but Liza simply said Why I have chicken on the brain.
Clear the crowd away
Tell the band to play
When you hear me say "GO" My honey
(Chorus)

== Popular culture ==
"Chicken Reel" usually introduces the chicken yard scene in many Foghorn Leghorn cartoons.

It is used as the theme song to the recurring minigame Astro Chicken in the Space Quest series of graphic adventure games, starting with Space Quest III.

A spirited arrangement of "Chicken Reel" for fiddle and Jew's harp is featured in A Christmas Story when the Bumpus family's bloodhounds swarm Ralphie's father as he arrives home from work.
