= Space Quest =

Video game series

- Genre: Point-and-click adventure
- Developers: Sierra On-Line, Dynamix
- Publisher: Sierra On-Line
- Creators: Mark Crowe, Scott Murphy
- Platforms: MS-DOS, Windows, Macintosh
- First release: 1986
- Latest release: 1995

Space Quest is a series of six comic science fiction adventure games released between 1986 and 1995. The games follow the adventures of a hapless janitor named Roger Wilco who finds himself entangled in intergalactic plots.

Initially created for Sierra On-Line by Mark Crowe and Scott Murphy (who called themselves the "Two Guys from Andromeda"), the games parody science fiction properties such as Star Wars and Star Trek as well as pop-culture phenomena from McDonald's to Microsoft. The series' sense of humor is characterized by puns and farcical storylines. Roger Wilco is depicted as an underdog who saves the universe (often by accident), only to be ignored or punished for violating minor regulations in the process.

The Space Quest games have been called "beloved cult classics" and influential adventure games of their era. Numerous collections of the games have been released since the 1990s, and the games continue to be sold on modern storefronts.

== Development ==
Mark Crowe and Scott Murphy met at Sierra. Crowe already worked at the company in marketing, and Murphy joined as a programmer. Both shared an interest in science fiction and felt that Sierra needed a game to distinguish from fantasy-themed titles such as Sierra's flagship King's Quest and The Black Cauldron, the latter of which they both worked on. The two also felt the studio released games with serious storylines and lacked a comedy game, with a protagonist who was a "regular guy" rather than a hero.

"Sierra was in a mindset where everything was medieval and it was all fairly serious. I wanted to do a game that was more fun. We even liked the idea of 'fun death'! I mean, if the player is gonna die or fail, they should at least get a laugh out of it."

— Scott Murphy

Sierra management was reluctant to greenlight a science fiction comedy game, thinking it would not sell, and studio head Ken Williams turned down the first game pitch in 1985. Crowe and Murphy created a short prototype in their free time and pitched Williams again, who was finally convinced.

Space Quest I was developed in Sierra's in-house AGI engine. The game was designed by "trial and error" as game development was still a new discipline and not formalized. Both writing and artwork were improvised throughout development, with the game being updated throughout even the quality assurance process.

== Games ==
Release timeline
1986	Space Quest I
1987	Space Quest II
1988
1989	Space Quest III
1990
1991	Space Quest IV
1992
1993	Space Quest V
1994
1995	Space Quest 6

=== Space Quest: The Sarien Encounter ===
The original Space Quest game was released in October 1986 as an intentional departure from Sierra's more serious, medieval-themed games. A remake was released in 1991 as Space Quest I: Roger Wilco in the Sarien Encounter.

=== Space Quest II: Vohaul's Revenge ===
Released in 1987, Space Quest II follows Roger Wilco a few months after the events of the first game. The sequel was well received and seen by critics as an improvement over the first.

=== Space Quest III: The Pirates of Pestulon ===
The third Space Quest game, released in 1989, was the first to be developed with Sierra's SCI engine, the successor to the earlier AGI engine, and was the first Space Quest game to feature sound card support.

=== Space Quest IV: Roger Wilco and the Time Rippers ===
Space Quest IV debuted in 1991, and would be the first Space Quest game to release on CD-ROM the following year. The game featured 256-color graphics, a point-and-click interface, and the CD-ROM release included recorded voice acting.

=== Space Quest V: Roger Wilco – The Next Mutation ===
Released in 1993, Space Quest V was the first Space Quest game to be developed outside of Sierra and the first to be developed without Scott Murphy. The game's development was led by Mark Crowe at Dynamix, a subsidiary of Sierra.

=== Space Quest 6: Roger Wilco in The Spinal Frontier ===
The final Space Quest was released in 1995. The game saw a troubled development, with Sierra employee Josh Mandel leading development and Scott Murphy serving as a consultant. Mark Crowe was not involved.

=== Other releases and appearances ===
- A demo for Space Quest 6 was released that, unusually, contains a scenario not included in the full game
- Sierra released a bundle of minigames from the Space Quest series as a collection titled Roger Wilco's Spaced Out Game Pack
- The video game Take a Break! Pinball features boards inspired by Sierra video games, including three from the Space Quest series
- Sierra's Hoyle's Official Book of Games, Volume I includes Roger Wilco as a computer opponent, and Volume III includes Roger as well as the villains Arnoid and Vohaul

== Cancelled games ==
=== Seventh Space Quest game ===
In early 1997, Sierra began development of a seventh entry in the series with Scott Murphy as director. Employees of Sierra reported that work was underway on a prototype, and Murphy stated that the game would feature multiplayer for the first time.

In August 1997, Sierra released a Space Quest collection that included a promotional video announcing a "late 1998" release date for what was then called Space Quest 7. Before the end of the year, however, game development was paused indefinitely in favor of projects believed to be more valuable. Two years later, Sierra management announced massive layoffs and development on a seventh Space Quest formally ceased.

=== Untitled Escape Factory game ===
Rumors circulated in 2002 that a developer called Escape Factory was working on a new Space Quest game. Production assets leaked in subsequent years would confirm the rumor, but the project was never formally announced nor formally confirmed by Escape Factory or Sierra. In contrast to the rest of the series, the game would have been a 3D action-adventure.

Escape Factory canceled the still-unnamed project after a year of development for an unexplained "variety of reasons." Concept art, screenshots, and video footage of early builds of the game have been published online. Industry sources claimed the game was being planned for the PlayStation 2 and Xbox but not home PCs.

== Other media ==
- The Adventures of Roger Wilco (1992): Adventure Comics, a division of Malibu Comics, released three issues of a Space Quest comic book. The series adapts the story of Space Quest: The Sarien Encounter.
- The Official Guide to Roger Wilco's Space Adventures (1991, 1993): A walkthrough and novelization of the Space Quest series written by Jill Champion. The first edition (1991) includes Space Quest I–IV, and the second edition (1993) adds coverage of Space Quest V.
- The Space Quest Companion (1992, 1993): A guidebook to the Space Quest series written by Peter and Jeremy Spear. Like The Official Guide, it combines walkthroughs with story sections told from Roger Wilco’s perspective. The first edition (1992) covers Space Quest I–IV; the second edition (1993) adds Space Quest V.

== Legacy ==
Space Quest has been remembered as an influential adventure and comedy game series. Along with other Sierra titles, Space Quest "defined the form" of point-and-click adventures. Critics have credited the games for being dense with "geeky" humor and for "paving the way" for future comedy adventure games. The series would be referenced by many future games as well as an enduring fan community, known in particular for the release of numerous fan games, such as 2011's Space Quest: Vohaul Strikes Back.

=== SpaceVenture ===
On March 25, 2012, Mark Crowe and Scott Murphy announced they had reunited under a company called Two Guys from Andromeda and planned an original adventure game set in space. Chris Pope (also known as SpacePope) co-founded the company and would serve as executive producer. The game, titled SpaceVenture, was intended to be a spiritual successor to the Space Quest series, starring a blue-collar spaceship worker named Ace Hardway. The SpaceVenture Kickstarter campaign launched on May 12, 2012 and narrowly reached its funding goal on June 12.

SpaceVenture soon entered development hell, experiencing a steady stream of setbacks, delays, and shifting release dates. By 2015, the game was considered "extraordinarily late", and an early, backers-only version would not be released until 2022. The game was not released to the public until April 1, 2025 when it was published on Steam Early Access—technically, still incomplete.

Critics proposed several explanations for the game's lengthy development. The developers appeared to be "out of their depth" with the Unity engine, lacking the expertise and resources to manage the project. The schedule was also impacted by a variety of personal problems unrelated to development, as well as misfortunes such as the death of Gary Owens in 2015 (narrator of Space Quest IV and Space Quest 6 and planned to return for SpaceVenture).

SpaceVenture received negative reviews, with reviewers noting the game still felt buggy and unfinished. The backers-only version was criticized as a bug-ridden "mess," and the April 2025 release described as a "disaster." The game exited early access with a full release on December 23, 2025.
