= Space Quest 6 =

1995 video game

Space Quest 6: Roger Wilco in the Spinal Frontier
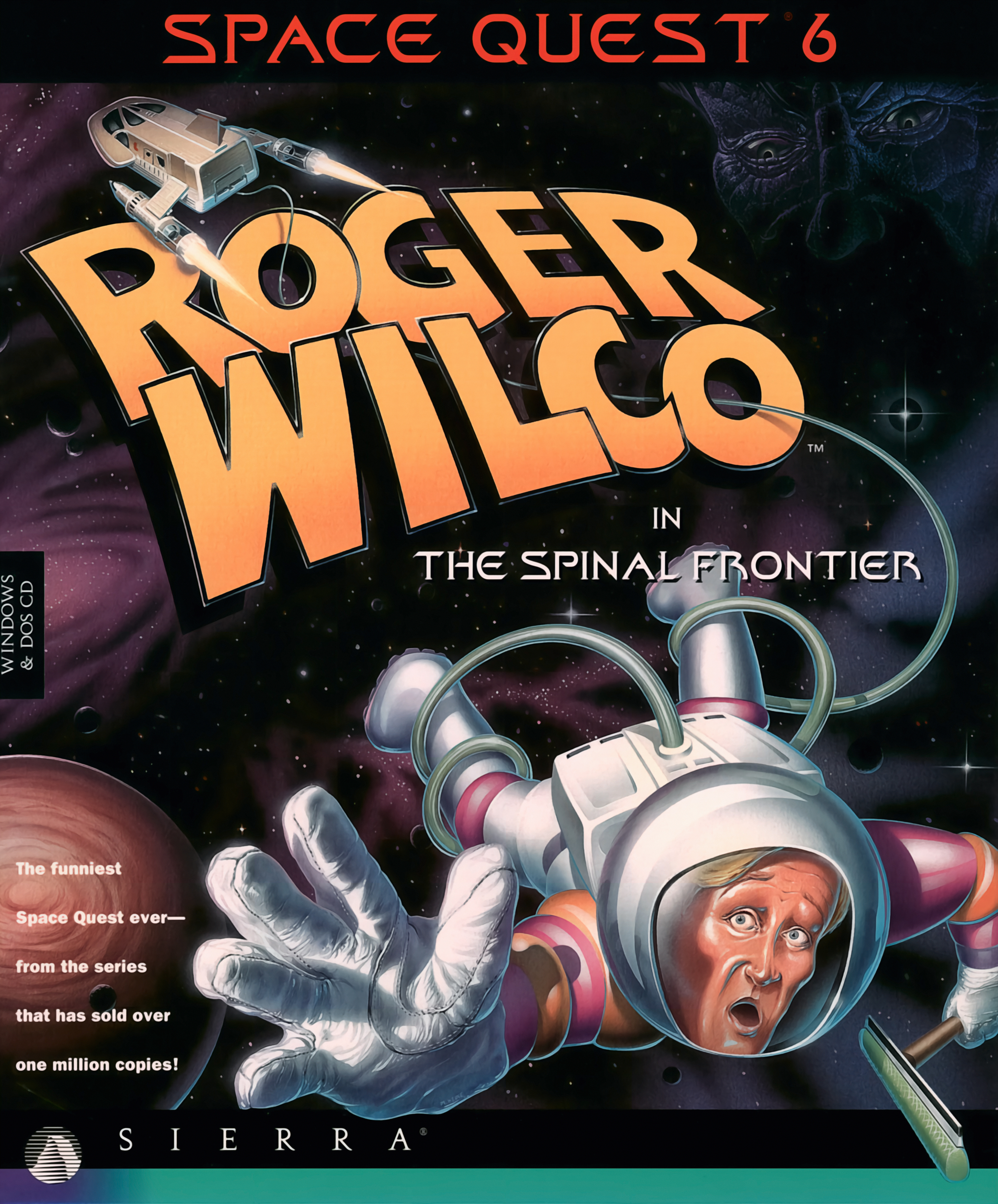
- Developer: Sierra On-Line
- Publisher: Sierra On-Line
- Producer: Oliver Brelsford
- Designers: Josh Mandel; Scott Murphy
- Programmer: Steve Conrad
- Artists: Michael Hutchison; John Shroades
- Writers: Scott Murphy; Josh Mandel
- Composers: Dan Kehler; Neal Grandstaff
- Series: Space Quest
- Engine: SCI32
- Platforms: MS-DOS, Windows, Macintosh
- Release: July 11, 1995; September 1995 (Mac)
- Genre: Adventure
- Mode: Single-player

Space Quest 6: Roger Wilco in the Spinal Frontier is a point-and-click adventure game developed and published by Sierra On-Line in 1995. It is the sixth and final game in the Space Quest series and, like the previous titles, features numerous parodies of science fiction media.

== Plot ==
The game begins with Roger Wilco facing trial for his actions during the previous game, Space Quest V. He is demoted to a second-class janitor aboard the SCS DeepShip 86.

Later, Commander Kielbasa of the DeepShip awards the crew shore leave on the planet Polysorbate LX while an elderly woman named Sharpei plots Roger's demise. Sharpei intends to use Roger's body to extend her own life as part of "Project Immortality."

Roger is rescued several times by Stellar Santiago, a humanoid alien who is a friend and love interest to Roger. Eventually, Sharpei manages to capture Stellar instead and attempts to use nanites to transfer her consciousness into Stellar's body. Roger uses miniaturization technology to shrink to a tiny size and thwart Sharpei's nanite robots from within Stellar's body.

The game concludes with Roger and Stellar reunited and Stellar hinting at Roger's "next assignment."

== Development and release ==
Space Quest 6: Roger Wilco in The Spinal Frontier ran on the later SCI32 engine Rev 2.100.002. This allowed it to use Super VGA graphics with 256 colors at 640×480 resolution. Unlike other SCI games, it did not have the interface in a pull down bar at the top of the screen, but instead used a "verb bar" window along the bottom of the screen, similar to LucasArts' SCUMM engine. The graphics style was also more cartoonish than in previous games, as well as incorporating an ample amount of 3-D rendered images. Gary Owens served as narrator once again.

This game was the last to be released in the Space Quest series. Having defeated the diabolical pukoid mutants in Space Quest V, Captain Roger Wilco triumphantly returns to StarCon headquarters - only to be court-martialed due to breaking StarCon regulations while saving the galaxy. The game's subtitle comes from the final portion, in which Roger has to undergo miniaturization and enter the body of a shipmate and romantic interest, a spoof of the 1987 movie Innerspace. (This segment also provided the game's original subtitle, Where in Corpsman Santiago is Roger Wilco?, which was not used due to legal threats from the makers of the Carmen Sandiego products.) The romantic interest provides a dilemma for Roger (unprecedented in the series) since she is a friend and someone other than the woman who bore Roger a son, according to the narrative in Space Quest IV.

Josh Mandel designed the majority of Space Quest 6 (with Scott Murphy on board in a "creative consultant" capacity) but had to leave the project shortly before completion due to internal strife with Sierra. Sierra asked Scott Murphy to complete the game, and then (reportedly against Murphy's wishes) promoted SQ6 as if the former "Guy from Andromeda" was solely responsible for it. As an additional result of this change in designers, some puzzles—primarily in the later stages of the game—were poorly implemented due to lack of communication. In a 2006 interview, Mandel spoke candidly about his disappointment with the uneven puzzle design and implementation in the game, "One of the inventory items cut was a comic book CD in Nigel's room that was fully readable and had all the hints to the Datacorder puzzle. From a writing and design standpoint, it was fully finished, and I know that Barry Smith had started the artwork. I don't understand why it was cut. But the comic book content was something I'd worked on for months, and it was something that I was uncharacteristically proud of ... I think it would've been one of the greatest parody sequences in the SQ series. So not only was I very upset not to see it in the game, but the fact that they had to put the Datacorder hints in the manual, leading player to think it was meant to be copy protection, disturbed me greatly."

Sierra On-Line created a special CD-ROM version of Space Quest 6's demonstration game, which was distributed with Sierra's Interaction Magazine, PC Gamer Disc 9 included with Volume 2, Issue 8 from August 1995, early pressings of Phantasmagoria, and possibly other media. This self-contained demonstration featured an alternate story not related to the main game and is fully voiced by the Space Quest 6 voice actors (early versions of the demo did not have full speech). The demo begins with Roger Wilco floating in space outside the bridge, washing the viewscreen while everyone else on the bridge is relaxing. Suddenly, out of nowhere, an Escher cube-shaped ship approaches the Deepship 86 and beams aboard two toaster-headed mechanoids - the Bjorn (a parody of the Borg, with their cube being a parody of the Borg Cube, and named after tennis champion Björn Borg). They turn all of the crew into scoops of lemon sorbet (except Roger, who quickly ducked behind the viewscreen). Now it is up to Roger to find a way to restore his crewmates and drive off the Bjorn invaders.

== Reception ==
Reception

Review scores
Publication	Score
Next Generation	3/5
PC Gamer (US)	82%
MacUser	2/5
Computer Game Review	97/91/93
Electronic Entertainment	4/5

According to Sierra On-Line, combined sales of the Space Quest series surpassed 1.2 million units by the end of March 1996.

A critic for Next Generation dismissed Space Quest 6 as being essentially identical to the previous five installments of the series aside from the specific puzzles. He gave the game three out of five stars, concluding, "If you liked the first five, you'll want this. If not, you probably aren't even reading this review." PC Gamer US's Gary Meredith wrote that it is "not the best of the Space Quest series", as it takes "a couple of steps backwards as far as the graphics and voice-overs are concerned". He criticized the game's narration, noting that he had disliked it in Space Quest IV as well. However, Meredith believed that Space Quest 6 would appeal to fans of the series.

Space Quest 6 tied for third place in Computer Game Review's 1995 "Adventure Game of the Year" award category. The editors noted its "good voice work" and "very nice animation", and praised its humor.
