= Scott Murphy (video game designer) =

American video game designer (born 1954)

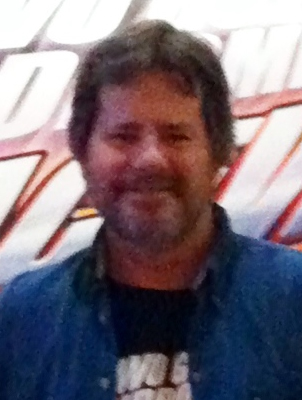
- Murphy in 2012
- Born: October 13, 1954 (age 71); Chicago, Illinois, United States
- Occupation: Game designer
- Employer: Guys from Andromeda
- Website: www.guysfromandromeda.com

Scott Murphy (born October 13, 1954) is an American video game designer, programmer, and writer who developed several adventure games, mostly for Sierra On-Line. He is best known for creating the Space Quest series, mostly with his fellow "Guy from Andromeda", Mark Crowe.

== Biography ==
Murphy started out in Sierra's hometown of Oakhurst, California by cooking at a local restaurant. When his friend Doug Oldfield joined Sierra, Murphy discovered his love for adventure games and soon joined the company himself. Murphy worked his way up from customer support to actually working on games. He first worked with Mark Crowe on The Black Cauldron. Crowe was the Art Director for the game when Murphy was added as a programmer. Murphy slowly became the only programmer on the project: "I put in a lot of free time over a summer spending nights out at his house debugging Black Cauldron. And then I ended up being the only one working on it. After a while, Ken and Al Lowe bailed out on me. So I got Black Cauldron shipping, and I was hooked."

During the development of The Black Cauldron, Murphy and Crowe discovered their mutual fondness for science fiction. Eventually, they created a four-room concept to propose to Sierra founder Ken Williams that would eventually become the beginning scenes of Space Quest. First released in 1986, Space Quest was a quick hit among adventure game fans and Murphy worked with Crowe to develop another three games, ending with Space Quest IV in 1991. During this time, Murphy also worked on games from other series, including King's Quest, EcoQuest, and Police Quest. After Space Quest IV, Crowe moved to work at Eugene, Oregon, home of Sierra subsidiary Dynamix, where he developed Space Quest V without Murphy's input. Space Quest returned to Murphy after Sierra came to him with a Space Quest 6 that had been started by Josh Mandel before he was ejected from the project. In 1997, Murphy began work on a proposed Space Quest 7, which was shelved and restarted several times until Sierra finally closed down its Oakhurst facility on February 22, 1999, in a layoff called "Chainsaw Monday" by Murphy. Murphy had been fired a month and a half prior, and as he had no formal education beyond high school, took up odd jobs and eventually moved to Alabama to support his mother.

In 2012, Murphy and Crowe came back together, and were joined by Chris Pope to start their own company called Guys from Andromeda. Following a successful Kickstarter campaign, they began work on a project called SpaceVenture as a spiritual successor to the Space Quest series.
