= Major Damage =

- Developer(s): Capcom Digital Studios
- Publisher(s): Capcom
- Platform(s): PlayStation, Sega Saturn
- Release: Unreleased
- Genre(s): Run and gun
- Mode(s): Single-player, multiplayer

Major Damage is an unreleased run and gun video game that was in development by Capcom Digital Studios and planned to be published by Capcom on a scheduled Q1 1997 release date for the PlayStation and Sega Saturn. Taking control of the titular protagonist of the game, players traverse through multiple stages by fighting against enemies. The title was first showcased to the public in 1996 and was one of the several projects under development by the US development division of Capcom, however it would eventually be left abandoned due to various factors. Despite never being officially released to the public by Capcom after its cancellation, two playable ISO image builds of the game have since been leaked online.

== Gameplay ==
Gameplay screenshot from the unreleased Sega Saturn version.

Major Damage is a side-scrolling run and gun game presented from a 2.5D perspective, where environments are rendered in 3D but the gameplay takes place on a 2D plane. The players move the selected character along this path; they can traverse the stages by running left and right, jump across platforms, and shoot in 16 directions against enemies. Though the single-player missions can be played normally and the settings in the options menu operate without issues, players are only able to play a determined number of levels due to its unfinished state. The players begin with a set number of lives and their player character can sustain a number of hits before dying and once all lives are lost, the game is over. As a result of its incomplete nature, the gameplay is prone to glitches and game-crashing bugs.

== History ==
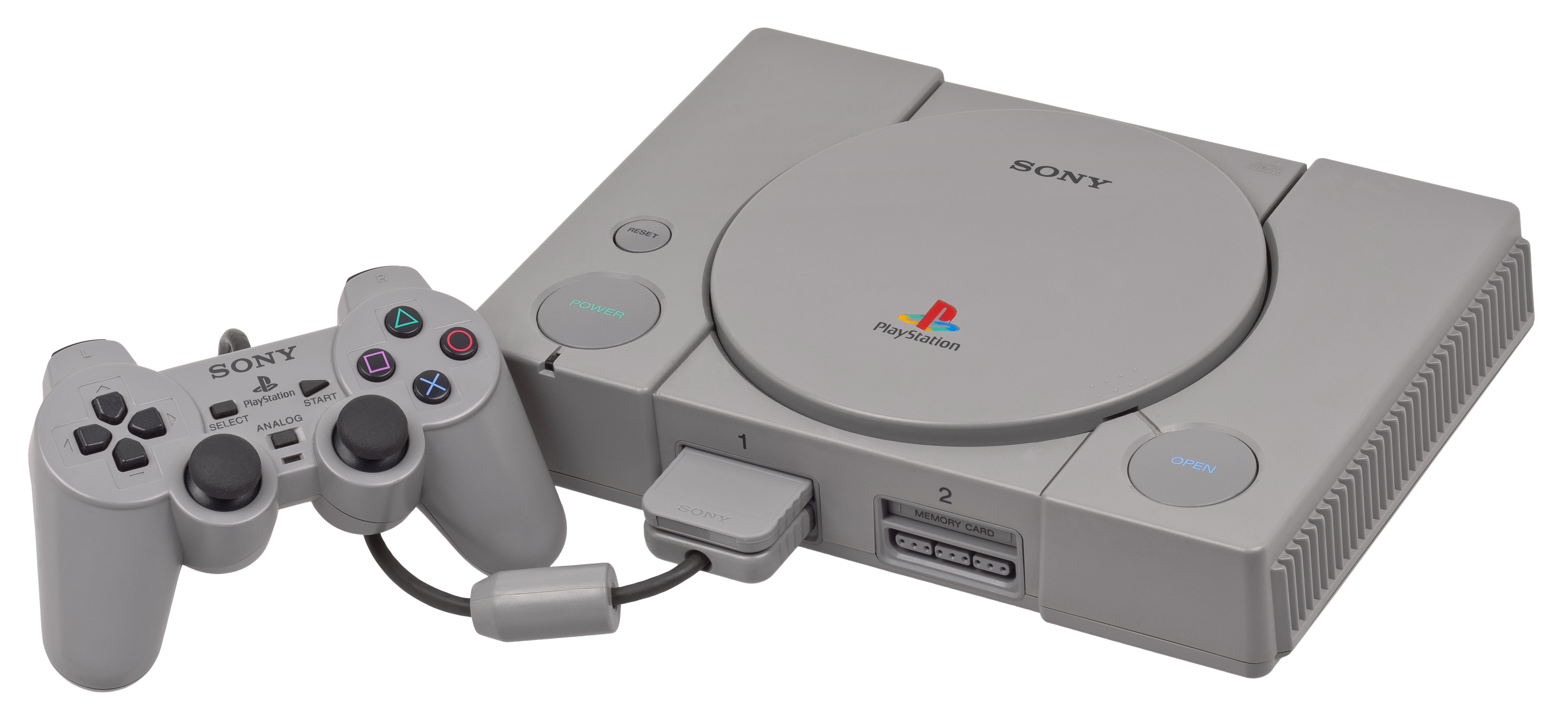
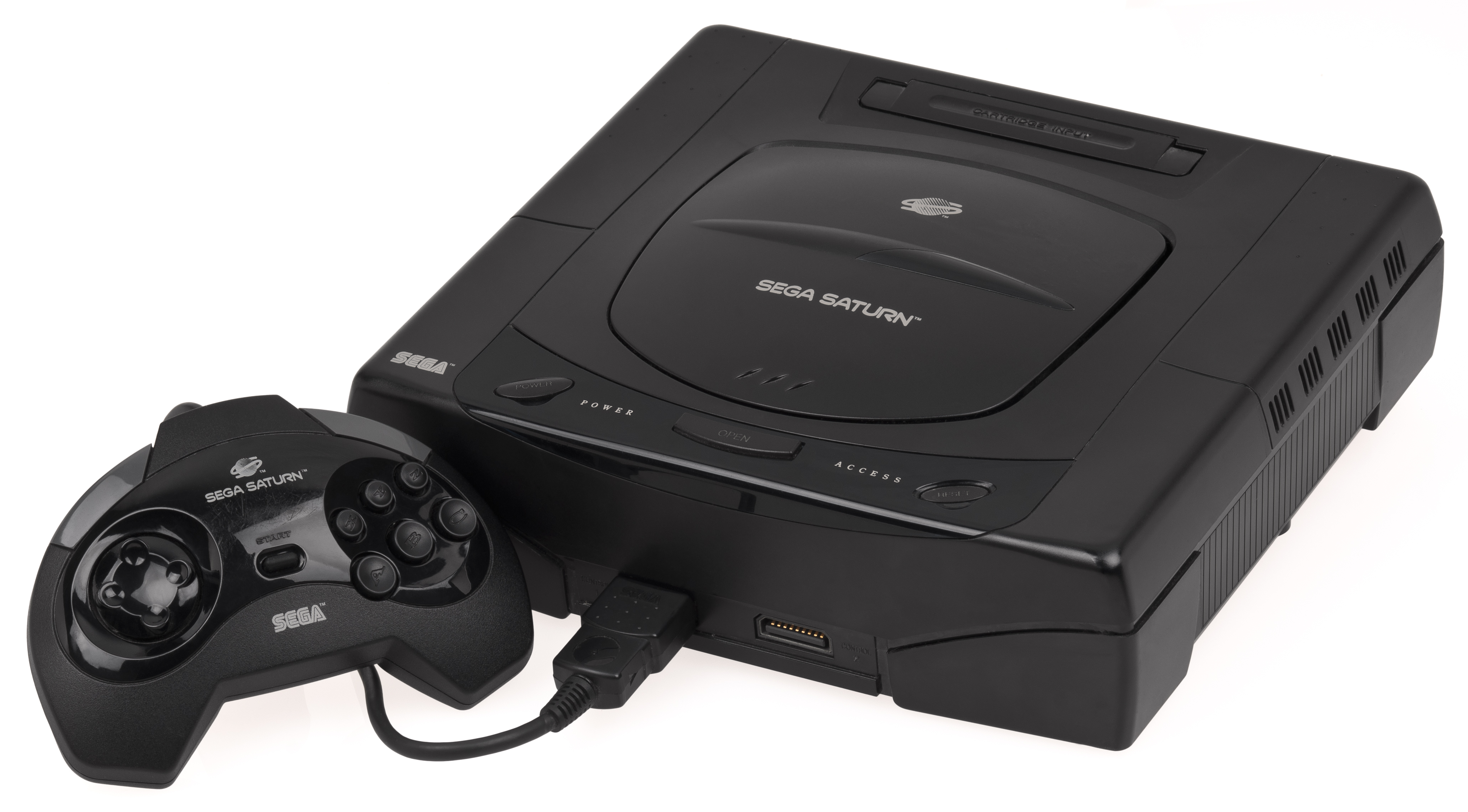
Along with Werewolf: The Apocolypse, Major Damage was one of the several projects under development by Capcom Digital Studios for PlayStation and Sega Saturn.

Major Damage was first shown off to the video game press and attendees at E3 1996 early in development and it was one of the several game project under development by Capcom Digital Studios for the PlayStation and Sega Saturn. The title was later previewed across several video game magazines that touted some of its key components before launch, with plans to be published between 1996 and 1997. However, development of the project was scrapped in the next year as a result of Capcom restructuring their US division. During this period, Aero the Acro-Bat creator David Siller was brought as head of the US development team, who would later state that one of the reasons for cancelling the project was due to lack of progress, not meeting expectations for the set scope and for "just being a bad game". A former Capcom level designer later stated that the company pitched the game to Sony Computer Entertainment in order to be released as an exclusive PlayStation title but the latter declined, with the designer suggesting that the reason was due to its resemblance with Blasto.

== Release ==
In recent years, two playable ISO image builds of Major Damage dated from 1996 for the Sega Saturn version have been leaked online, with each one containing multiple differences between each other. However, these builds can only be played by one human player.
