= Space Quest: Vohaul Strikes Back =

2011 video game

- Developer: Team VSB
- Series: Space Quest (unofficial)
- Engine: AGS
- Platforms: Windows, Linux, Mac OS X
- Release: December 22, 2011
- Genre: Adventure
- Mode: Single-player

Space Quest: Vohaul Strikes Back is a non-commercial fan-made sequel to Sierra's Space Quest series, released in 2011.

== Premise ==
When a fallen nemesis returns to wreak vengeance on the galaxy, it is up to space janitor Roger Wilco to tread the treacherous ice world of Radon, outwit an army of simian commandos, and lead the indigenous people in a revolution to take back the planet and defeat the diabolical mad scientist Sludge Vohaul.

== Development ==
Beginning in April 2002, the game was developed by a group of volunteers in their spare time for over nine years. The developers used the free Adventure Game Studio engine, created by Chris Jones.

The game contains approximately:

- 90 playable rooms
- 70 speaking characters
- 8000 lines of dialogue
- 7700 sprites
- 50 pieces of music
- 80 inventory items
- 60-70 unique ways for Roger Wilco to die

A voice pack was planned to add speech to the game, but never released.

Several authors of Vohaul Strikes Back, most notably Chris Ushko, also worked on another fan-made sequel, Space Quest: Incinerations, which was in development for over six years and released just a few weeks after Vohaul Strikes Back, in January 2012.

== Reception ==
On Rock, Paper, Shotgun, Richard Cobbett gave the game a favourable review, noting a "shaky start", but calling the game an "excellent tribute to the series and a very enjoyable game in its own right" that is "funny, surprisingly long, and well worth the download".

Cassandra Khaw of IndieGames.com noted that "Though greatly lacking in the voice pack department, Vohaul Strikes Back makes up for it by offering charm, charisma and no small amount of humor".

In his review of the game at Adventure Gamers, Rob Murrant pointed out a clash between the background and character art, but mentioned that "Despite the graphical mismatch, once you start playing it's not off-putting in any way, and once you're well into the story you'll barely even notice the two contrasting styles. Combined with an excellent soundtrack and effects, slick point-and-click interface and clever, amusing storyline, there's little to complain about VSB's production quality", ending the review with "As it is, Vohaul Strikes Back is an excellent indie release, and one that no Space Quest fan should miss."

Greg Collins of Just Adventure wrote: "Sure, the animation of the sprites is a bit crude, but this is another excellent, professionally wrought AGS adventure that probably took thousands of man-woman-robot hours to lovingly complete."

Jeff Mattas of Shacknews has commented on the early parts of the game by saying "I've only played a short bit of it so far, myself, but from what I can tell, it's well written and funny, and seems to do an adept job at capturing the irreverent style and humor of its six official predecessors."

At the 2011 AGS Awards, the game won the award for Best Non-Player Character. And was nominated for Best Gameplay, Best Background Art and Best Music.
