= VSB-TV =

Television station in Hamilton, Bermuda (1991–2014)

- Hamilton; Bermuda
- Channels: Analog: 11 (VHF)
- Branding: VSB TV-11

Programming
- Affiliations: NBC (1991–2014)

Ownership
- Owner: DeFontes Group Ltd.

History
- First air date: June 1991
- Last air date: August 31, 2014

VSB-TV (channel 11) was a television station in Hamilton, Bermuda, which served the British territory as an affiliate of the American network NBC. The station was owned by the DeFontes Group, a Bermuda-based company which also owned and operated radio stations on the island.

On August 31, 2014, VSB-TV ceased broadcasting over the air due to financial difficulties; it had not launched digital operations in ATSC, Bermuda's digital television format. The news operation continued online for one more year before DeFontes completely ceased operations.

== History ==
The DeFontes Broadcasting Company, who had started VSB Radio in 1983, decided in 1990 that it would start television transmissions. Tests started in 1990 on channel 13, but a lightning strike knocked off the transmitter before launching regular broadcasts. As consequence, VSB built a new transmitter on channel 11 and started broadcasting in the summer of 1991. The station had started producing the VSB Evening News, a half-hour bulletin, within six months of launch. VSB bought the return of television competition to Bermuda, as, eight years earlier in 1983, the Capital Broadcasting Company, owners of ZFB, and the Bermuda Broadcasting Company, owners of ZBM, merged their radio and television assets. Bermuda now had three television stations.

VSB was the first station in Bermuda to use chroma key, virtual sets and regular sports and weather segments, the latter of which with moving maps.

After the closure of VSB-TV, DeFontes closed the television business due to a costly process of converting to digital broadcasting, before shutting down the company altogether.

== Programming and newscasts ==
VSB's schedule ran an hour ahead of the Eastern Time Zone without any delays, which meant prime time began at 9 p.m. Atlantic Time and Today began live at 8 a.m. AT, with the late local news carried at midnight AT. The station also ran Access Hollywood Live and The Ellen DeGeneres Show.

Other station newscasts were carried at 7 p.m. AT and 8:30 p.m. AT, with the NBC Nightly News airing live at 7:30 p.m. AT.

== Discontinuation of operations ==
On August 29, 2014, the ownership of VSB announced that over-the-air broadcasting would be suspended indefinitely due to financial losses, effective August 31, 2014, while expressing the hope that the station might reorganize and return to the air in the future. Declining advertising revenues resulting in continual deficits were cited by DeFontes Group. A daily 20-min. video streaming of VSB News Online continued for another year, produced by VSB staff.

On September 1, 2015, it was announced that DeFontes Group would cease all remaining operations and lay off all 19 of its staff. The station's news director said, "declining advertising revenues concurrent with the explosion of electronic media had been our death knell", when DeFontes Broadcasting ceased operations completely on September 30, 2015, including its radio stations and online streaming.
