= Space Quest V =

1993 video game

Space Quest V: Roger Wilco – The Next Mutation
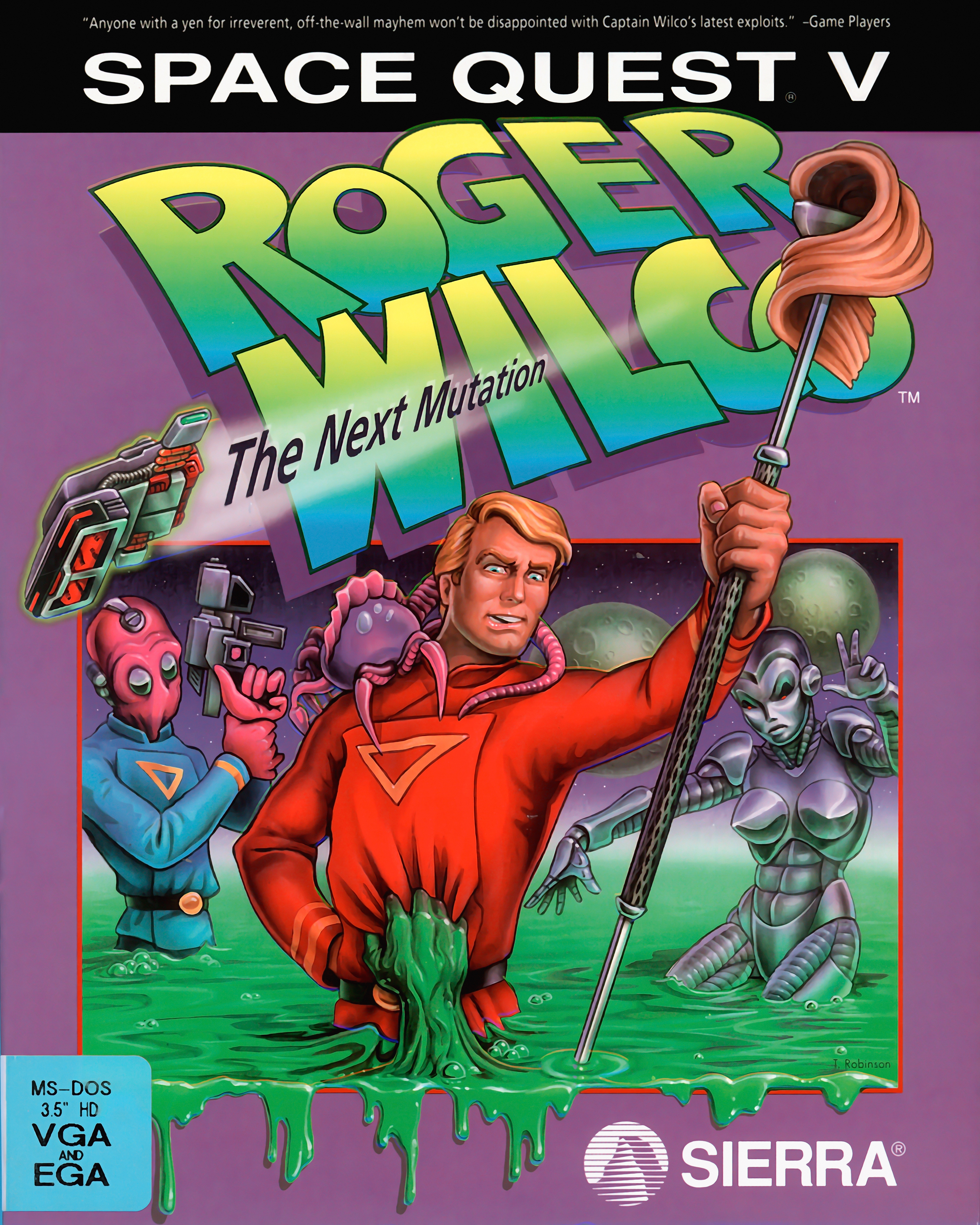
- Developer: Dynamix
- Publisher: Sierra On-Line
- Directors: Mark Crowe; David Selle
- Producer: Mark Crowe
- Designer: Mark Crowe
- Programmer: David Sandgathe
- Artist: Shawn Sharp
- Composers: Timothy Steven Clarke; Christopher Stevens
- Series: Space Quest
- Engine: SCI
- Platform: MS-DOS
- Release: NA: March 1, 1993; EU: 1993
- Genre: Adventure
- Mode: Single-player

Space Quest V: Roger Wilco – The Next Mutation is a graphic adventure game developed by Dynamix and released by Sierra On-Line for MS-DOS on February 5, 1993. The game is the fifth entry in the Space Quest series, and the first game to be only designed by Mark Crowe. The story, set within a spoof of the Star Trek franchise, focuses on players taking control of Roger Wilco, who achieves his dreams of becoming a star captain but winds up involved in saving the galaxy from a deadly threat posed by a man-made virus.

The game was welcomed by critics as a fun addition to the series, although did not feature a voice-cast version as with Space Quest IV. A sequel, Space Quest 6, was released in 1995.

== Plot ==
=== Setting ===
The game is set in a universe that parodies various notable science fiction franchise, including Alien and The Fly. Unusually for the Space Quest series, Space Quest V specifically parodies Star Trek, including aspects such as ships, crew members and references from episodes in the franchise. In the story, players assume the role of Roger Wilco, who, since the events of Space Quest IV, has applied to become a captain to fulfill a lifelong dream, while in the background an investigation is launched in to a spate of toxic dumping in the galaxy that is feared to be causing trouble.

=== Story ===
Following the events of Space Quest IV, lowly janitor Roger Wilco applies for a place at Starcon Academy, hoping to become a captain on his own ship. While at the Academy, Roger makes an enemy of Raems T. Quirk (a rather blatant spoof of Captain James T. Kirk) - a toupee-wearing commander in command of Starcon's most prized ship, the SCS Goliath. During an aptitude test, which Roger cheats through, Starcon is visited by Ambassador Beatrice Wankmeister - the very woman Roger is set to have a relationship with, after learning of her from his future son. Beatrice requests an escort to help her as she investigates bizarre cases of toxic dumping across the galaxy; Quirk offers to assist her, and Starcon allows her to make use of the Goliath for her investigations.

Meanwhile, Roger successfully achieves his dream, and is given command of his own ship, the garbage scow SCS Eureka (which looks and functions like an oversized vacuum cleaner). Working alongside his crew, the Eureka works to clean up rubbish, picking up a facehugger creature that Roger takes on as a pet. They also intercept a transmission on a Starcon frequency, concerning a collection from an unknown figure. After collecting rubbish in orbit over a jungle planet, the Eureka comes under attack by a homicidal gynoid named WD40, sent by the same company that came after him in Space Quest III. Roger outwits the gynoid on the planet's surface, securing it for the ship along with a cloaking device from the droid's own ship.

When the crew take a moment to relax at a "space bar", Roger finds his chief engineer Cliffy (a parody of Scotty from the original Star Trek) engaged in a bar brawl with some of the Goliath's crew. Quirk, who witnesses this, arrests him, forcing Roger to break him out of the bar's brig. As the Eureka resumes its mission, Roger is forced to investigate a colony on a barren planet when the ship finds it deserted. To his shock, he finds the colonists have become mutants; the only clues to what happened are a canister found dumped near the colony, belong to a genetics company, and a log entry of a colonist stating the colony was attacked sometime after it was visited by the Goliath.

Shortly after leaving the planet, the Eureka receives an SOS from Quirk, revealing his ship is under attack. Responding to the call, the crew find an escape pod left the Goliath, containing Beatrice. She reveals the ship got hit by mutants, and that Quirk and the crew were mutated as a result; as she herself is undergoing mutation, Roger puts her into cryo-sleep to slow down the process until he can find a cure. Tracking down the genetic company, Roger, despite a transporter malfunction, discovers scientists in the company sought to create a virus for terraforming, but it mutated and started attacking living creatures. The experiment was ended, but the lead scientist had to get rid of the vats of the virus; Quirk turns out to have been bribed to dump the vats around the galaxy.

Through an unusual idea from his pet facehugger, Roger suggests to Cliffy in using the teleporter to separate the virus from Beatrice. The process works, leading him to launch a daring raid on the Goliath to see if the process can be done to the others. With help from a reprogrammed WD40, Roger successfully rescues what is left of the ship's crew, but finds Quirk, mutated beyond rescue, flees the ship in order to infect the Eureka. Rescuing Beatrice, Roger sets his ship to self-destruct, destroying the virus for good. Beatrice joins him and the survivors, as they leave in the Goliath for Starcon.

== Development ==
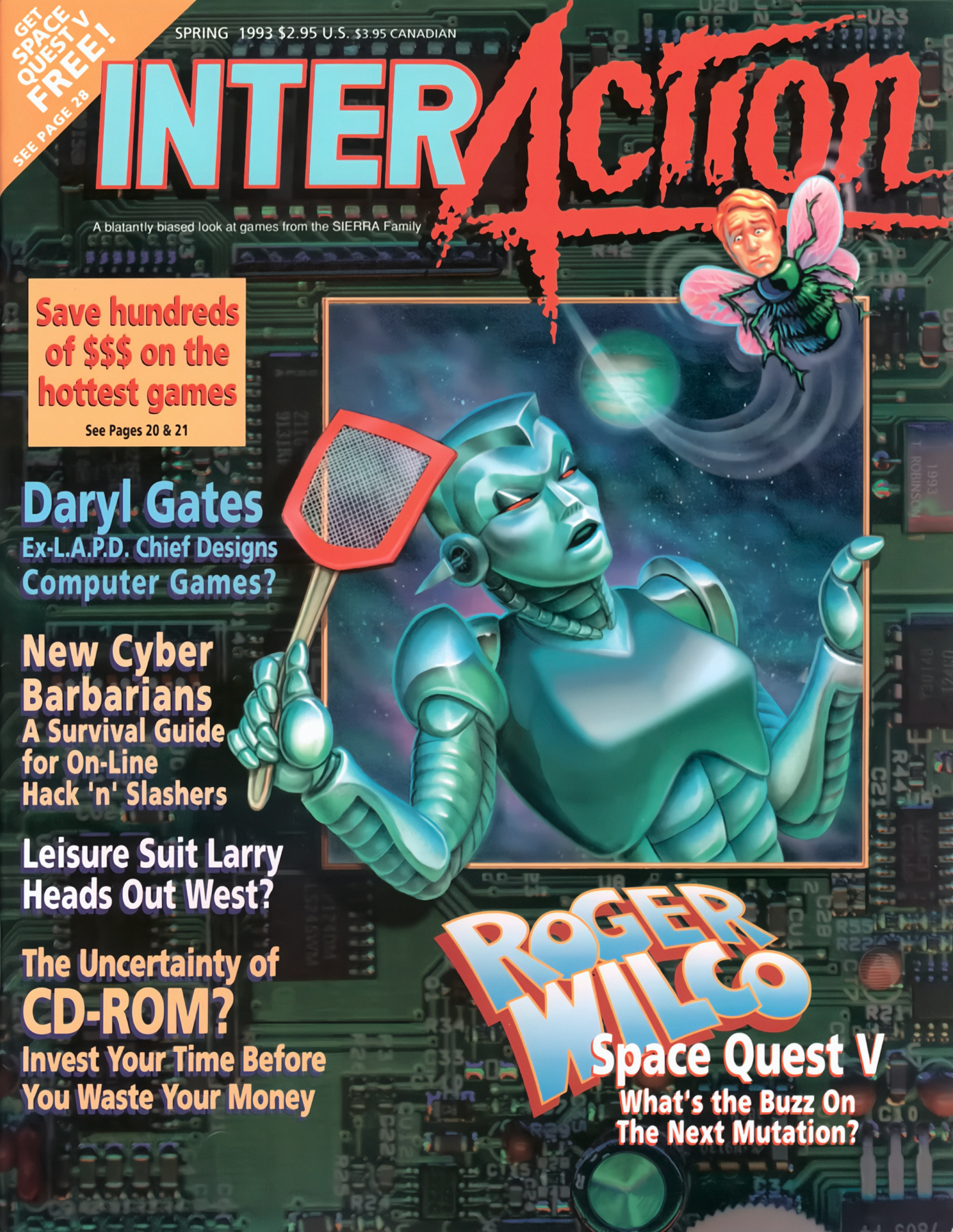
Space Quest V featured on the cover of Interaction, the fan magazine of Sierra On-Line.

This game was the first in the series not designed by the "Two Guys from Andromeda", as only Mark Crowe worked on the project. It was also the first Space Quest game that wasn't developed in-house by Sierra On-Line, but instead by Sierra's sister company, Dynamix, to which Mark Crowe had relocated shortly after the release of Space Quest IV.

Space Quest V was also the only Space Quest game, and the second Sierra title overall (Leisure Suit Larry 5 was the first) to be sponsored by a real-life company. The logo for Sprint would appear following any communications transmissions, appear on a billboard in the Spacebar, and also appear in the ending credits. Additionally, at one point in the game, there is a dialogue between two people where one denounces MCI's "Friends & Aliens" plan as "just not worth it." Space Quest V was one of several Sierra games given away as a reward for signing up for service with Sprint. There is also a mention of "TT&A".

Although this game came after the CD-ROM "talkie" version of Space Quest IV, it was originally released on floppy disks only (although it would later be released on a compilation CD containing the entire Space Quest series), and early plans for a talkie version of the game were scrapped. According to then-Dynamix artist Sean Murphy, this was because Dynamix was in financial trouble at the time, and they were eager to release new games instead of working on "gold versions" of already-released games.

== Copy protection ==
The game's copy protection involves the players being required to input five-digit target navigation coordinates in the warp drive (each coordinate represents a different planet or space station), from a chart in the printed manual. Similar to Space Quest IV, there is a puzzle based around the copy protection system where an undocumented code needs to be discovered via in-game exploration.

== Reception ==
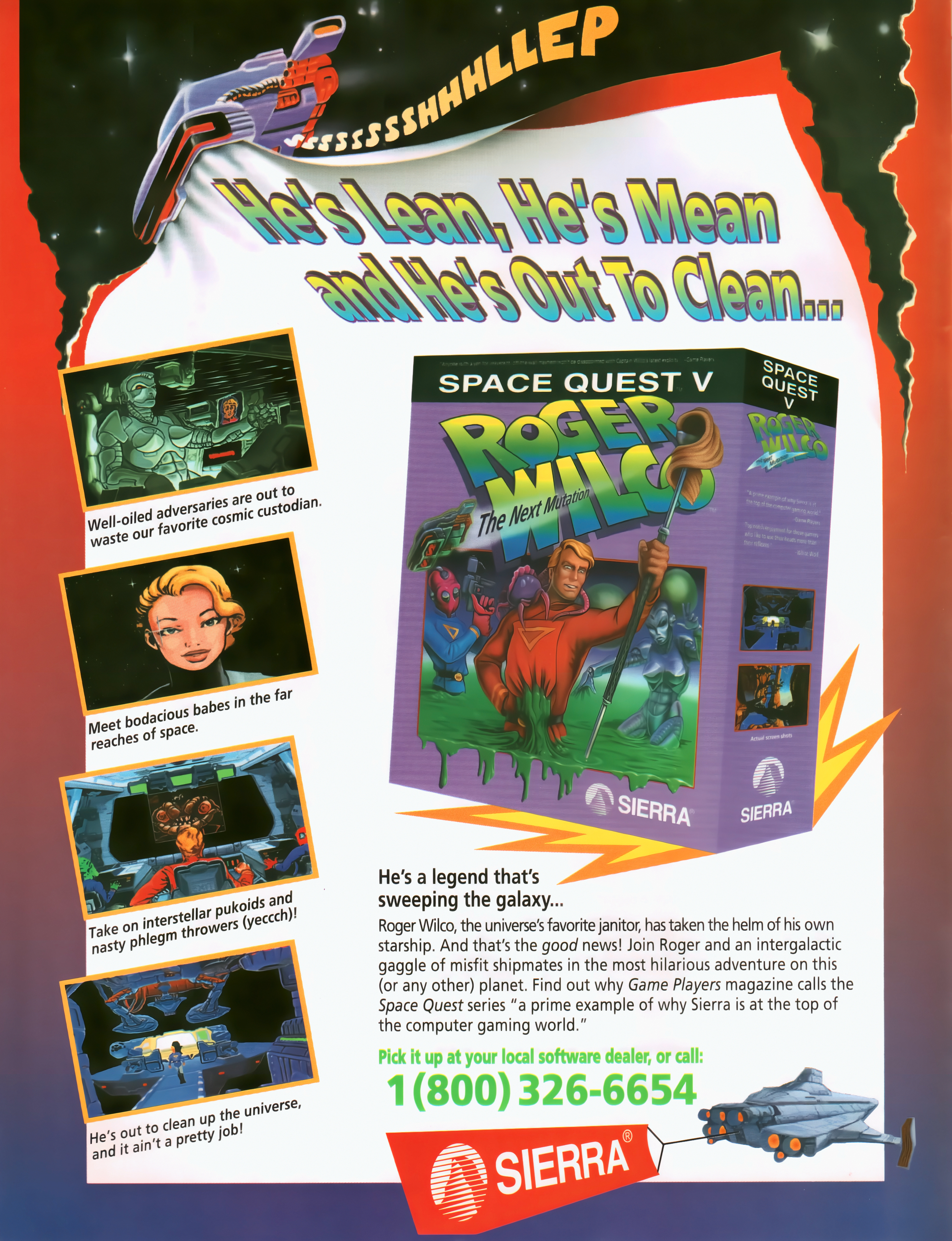
Magazine ad.

According to Sierra On-Line, combined sales of the Space Quest series surpassed 1.2 million units by the end of March 1996.

Charles Ardai in Computer Gaming World stated that the game was both funny and suspenseful. He praised the "first-rate" graphics and sound, and described the dialogue and narration as "written with a dry wit and a sense of character that makes them a pleasure to read". Ardai concluded "I think even the most demanding Wilcophiles will be pleased".
