= Mark Crowe =

American video game designer

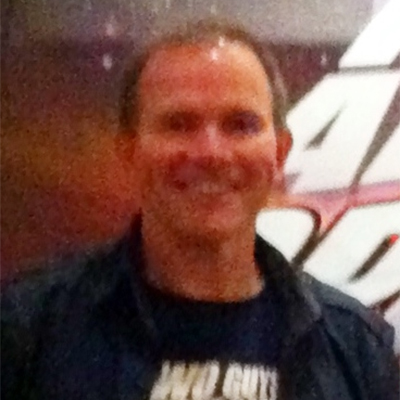
- Born: United States
- Occupation(s): Video game designer, artist, writer
- Employer: Guys from Andromeda
- Website: www.guysfromandromeda.com

Mark Crowe is an American video game designer, artist, and writer who developed several adventure games for Sierra On-Line and its subsidiary Dynamix. He later worked at Pipeworks Software as Studio Design Director. Crowe is best known for creating the Space Quest series, mostly with his fellow "Guy from Andromeda", Scott Murphy.

== Biography ==
Crowe started working at Sierra in its Art Department, creating designs for boxes and manuals. Crowe worked on several Sierra games, including Winnie the Pooh in the Hundred Acre Wood and King's Quest II, before collaborating with Scott Murphy on The Black Cauldron. Crowe was the Art Director for the game when Murphy was added as a programmer.

During the development of The Black Cauldron, Murphy and Crowe discovered their mutual fondness for science fiction. Eventually, they created a four-room concept to propose to Sierra founder Ken Williams that would eventually become the beginning scenes of Space Quest. First released in 1986, Space Quest was a quick hit among adventure game fans and Murphy worked with Crowe to develop another three games, ending with Space Quest IV in 1991. During this time, Crowe also worked on games from other series, including King's Quest, Leisure Suit Larry, and Police Quest. After Space Quest IV, Crowe moved to work at Eugene, Oregon, home of Sierra subsidiary Dynamix, where he developed Space Quest V without Murphy's input. During his time at Dynamix, Crowe worked on several other games, including the Earthsiege series.

Following major layoffs at Sierra and Dynamix in 1999, Crowe joined some of his former co-workers from Dynamix at Pipeworks Software, where he served as Studio Design Director. At Pipeworks, Crowe worked on a number of games including Godzilla: Destroy All Monsters Melee and Night at the Museum: Battle of the Smithsonian.

In 2012, Crowe left Pipeworks to join with Murphy and Chris Pope to start their own company called Guys from Andromeda. Following a successful Kickstarter campaign, they began work on a project called SpaceVenture as a spiritual successor to the Space Quest series.

In 2015, after Murphy needed some time away from the project for personal reasons, Crowe and Pope shifted focus on to a portion of SpaceVenture that didn't require as much writing. The game sequence features a character called Cluck Yegger and is built to play a key role in the game. To bring more funding into the project, Crowe and Pope decided to make the Cluck Yegger sequence into a game and release it to the public. The game was named Cluck Yegger in Escape From The Planet of The Poultroid. It was released privately to backers of SpaceVenture on October 29. 2015, and then was greenlit on Steam and released publicly on November 9, 2015.
