= Dead Time =

Dead time is the time after an event during which detection systems are not able to record another event.

Dead Time or Dead time may also refer to:

- Dead Time: Kala, a 2007 Indonesian film
- Dead Time, an early tentative title for the A&E television series Paranormal State
- Dead time (imprisonment), time spent institutionalized that does not count as credit toward the defendant's sentence.
- Dead Time (Creaming Jesus), a 1991 EP by the band Creaming Jesus
- "Dead Time" (Merseybeat), a 2001 television episode

== See also ==
- Deadtime Stories (disambiguation)
