= Lost Secret of the Rainforest =

1993 video game

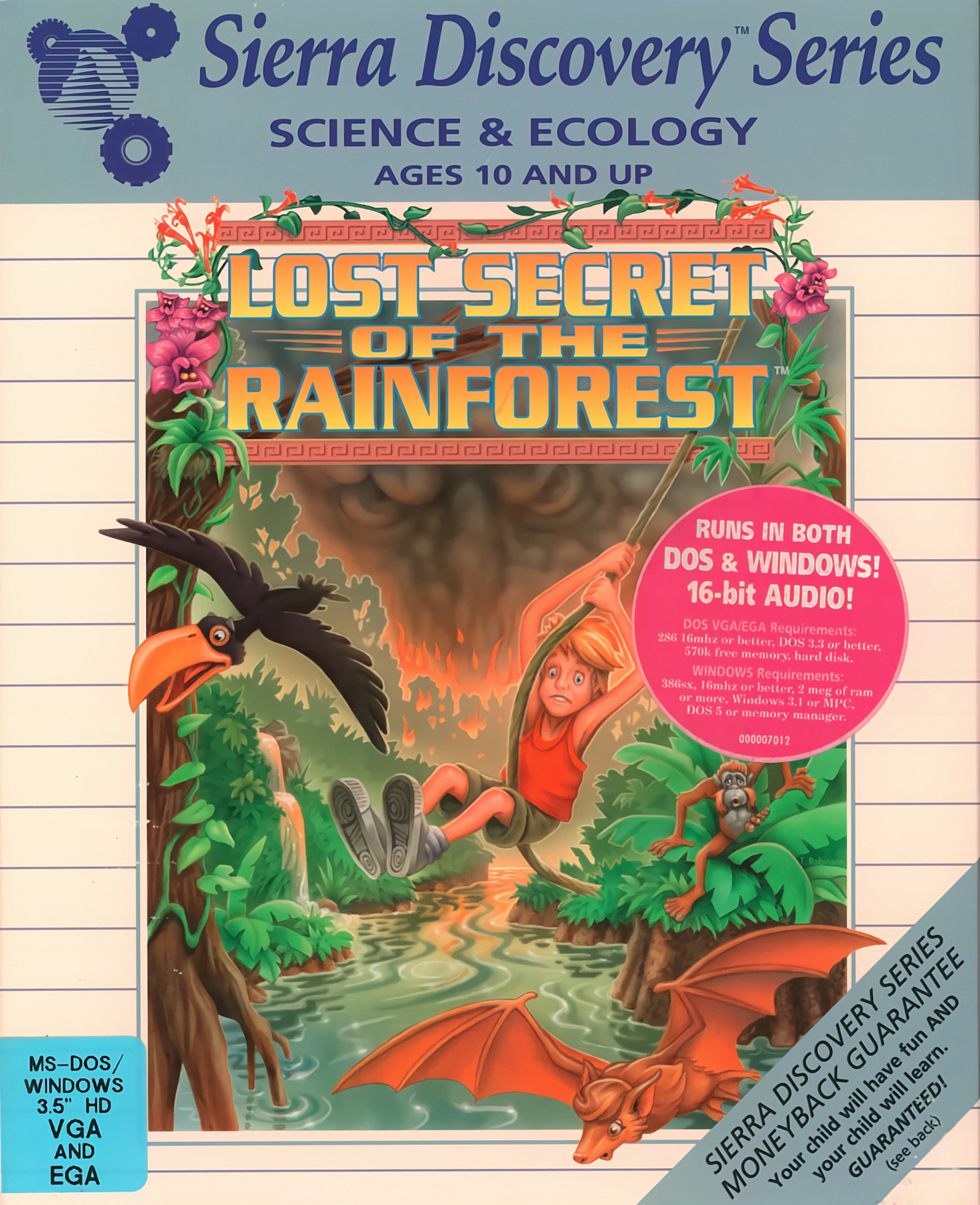
- Developer: Sierra On-Line
- Publishers: NA: Sierra On-Line; EU: Coktel Vision
- Director: Gano Haine
- Producer: Cheryl Sweeney
- Designer: Gano Haine
- Programmers: Bob Fischbach; Doug Oldfield
- Artists: Arturo Sinclair; Andy Hoyos
- Composer: Dan Kehler
- Engine: SCI
- Platforms: MS-DOS, Windows
- Release: 1993
- Genres: Educational, adventure
- Mode: Single-player

Lost Secret of the Rainforest (aka EcoQuest II, though this does not appear in the game's title) is an educational adventure game developed by Sierra On-Line in 1993 for the MS-DOS and Microsoft Windows. It is the sequel to EcoQuest: The Search for Cetus. The game designer is Gano Haine and unlike the first game Jane Jensen was not involved in creating the second game, having moved on to create the Gabriel Knight series.

== Gameplay ==
In Lost Secret of the Rainforest, the second installment in the series, Adam, now slightly older and able to speak with animals as a matter of course, explores the tropical rainforest in search of a cure of a disease afflicting the local Indigenous peoples of South America, and a way to save the rainforest from destruction. One of the game's innovations was the "Ecorder" display: a tricorder-like device Adam uses to learn about things he finds during his journey. According to Pelit, the game is somewhat harder than its predecessor and places more emphasis on the dangers of selfishness and greed, as opposed to the blight of man.

== Reception ==
Lisa Young for Compute! wrote: "Although the game targets children age 10 and older, young users may find some of the problems frustrating; however, the thrill of solving a difficult problem is rewarding and may encourage them to continue".
