= Daniel Humbarger =

American stand-up comedian

- Born: Phoenix, Arizona
- Education: University of California, San Diego, University of Arizona's James E. Rogers College of Law
- Occupation: Stand-up comedian
- Years active: 2011-present

Daniel Humbarger is an American stand-up comedian from Sacramento, California.

Humbarger's 2018 Stand Up! Records album Funny Bones reached No. 1 on Amazon's comedy chart and No. 2 on the iTunes comedy chart.

== Early life ==
Humbarger was born in Phoenix, Arizona. His family moved frequently; he lived in six states and attended 11 schools before his family settled during his teen years in Washington state. His father, a truck driver, died when Humbarger was 13; Humbarger told Capital Public Radio that the event brought a dark edge to his comedy.

Humbarger was a rave DJ for two years before joining the United States Air Force to fund his college studies, eventually settling in Sacramento. He earned his bachelor's degree at the University of California, San Diego, then went to the University of Arizona's James E. Rogers College of Law. He worked as an attorney in corporate bankruptcy for several years.

== Career ==
=== Stand-up comedy ===
Humbarger began performing at open mics in 2002, and turned professional as a comic in 2011. He won the 2010 Laugh Auburn First Comedy Night Contest. He quickly advanced into hosting comedy events, and co-created the longrunning pun-battle show Capital Punishment in 2016.

Humbarger's comedy is observational and often dark. Describing his comedy, Lesley Goldwater of the Carson City, Nevada news site Carson Now said that "Daniel uses his dark sense of humor to explore subjects that are smart, weird, sometimes inappropriate and personal."

He has performed across the U.S. and in England, Scotland, and Germany, and at festivals including the Edinburgh Festival Fringe (where he won the Manchester Comedy Store Competition in 2018), the Altercation Comedy Festival in Austin, Texas, San Francisco Comedy Competition, San Francisco Comedy Festival, Savage Henry Festival, SF Sketchfest, Sacramento Comedy Festival and the S.H.I.T.S. and Giggles Festival in Humboldt, California.

With comic Johnny Taylor, he co-hosted the sports podcast Cowbell Kingdom in 2015 and 2016.

He was featured on the cover of the August 23, 2016 issue of Sacramento's Submerge Magazine.

He appears in director Larry Brand's 2012 documentary The Coexist Comedy Tour.

=== Albums ===
Humbarger recorded his debut stand-up album, Funny Bones, at Sacramento Comedy Spot in 2016. It was released by Stand Up! Records in 2018, and reached No. 1 on Amazon's comedy chart and No. 2 on the iTunes comedy chart.

=== Other work ===
Humbarger also works in the video game industry, as a game designer, voice actor, and community manager. He is a voice actor in the Phoenix Online game Cognition: An Erica Reed Thriller, playing Officer Jonathan Duffner.

== Discography ==
- Daniel Humbarger, Funny Bones (Stand Up! Records, 2018)

== Podcast appearances ==
- Cowbell Kingdom, multiple episodes as co-host, 2015 and 2016
- The Junior & Leo Show, Episode 24 (September 22, 2012) and Episode 98 (June 27, 2013)
- Gag On This… Podcast, Episode 85 (May 25, 2020)
- Barley & Me, Episode 18 (March 7, 2016)
- ComedyWham, "The Many Lives of Daniel Humbarger" (October 20, 2018)
- Radio Tatas!, Episode 170 (September 30, 2018)
- The Hard Talk with Johnny Taylor, Episode 9 (December 2, 2020) and Episode 15 (December 2, 2020)
- STAB!, Episode 257 (May 3, 2021)
- Illuminati By Nature, Episode 42 (November 8, 2019)
- Random Thoughts With Robert Omoto, Episode 176 (September 9, 2020)
- Sportsball with Drew Absher, June 15, 2021 and August 25, 2020
- UK Pun Off, August 5, 2020, August 28, 2021, and October 17, 2021
