= Moebius: Empire Rising =

2014 video game

- Developers: Phoenix Online Studios; Pinkerton Road Studio
- Publisher: Phoenix Online Publishing
- Designer: Jane Jensen
- Composer: Robert Holmes
- Platforms: Microsoft Windows, OS X, Linux
- Release: April 15, 2014
- Genre: Graphic adventure
- Mode: Single-player

Moebius: Empire Rising is a graphic adventure video game developed by Pinkerton Road Studio and Phoenix Online Studios, and published by Phoenix Online Publishing. It is for Microsoft Windows, OS X and Linux.

== Plot ==
The game's protagonist is Malachi Rector, a globe-trotting antiques dealer. A secretive government agency called FITA hires him to investigate a murdered woman in Venice. He soon encounters David Walker, a soldier who seems to have a mysterious connection with him. Malachi travels the world investigating various incidents and their ties to history.

== Development ==
Pinkerton Road Studio was formed by Jane Jensen and her husband Robert Holmes as a way to step back into game development as independents. On April 10, 2012, Pinkerton Road announced their plans to have a crowd funded production of two new graphic-adventure games titled Moebius and Mystery Game X, inspired by recent Kickstarter successes such as Double Fine's recent success of using Kickstarter to fund Double Fine Adventure.

On May 7, 2012, Pinkerton Road Studio reached its Kickstarter goal of $300,000. Jane Jensen's Kickstarter campaign ended on May 19, accumulating around $435,000 from backers (less fees). The game was ultimately programmed by Phoenix Online Studios.

== Reception ==
Reception

Aggregate scores
Aggregator	Score
GameRankings	60%
Metacritic	54/100

Review scores
Publication	Score
Adventure Gamers	2.5/5
Eurogamer	5/10 (Germany); 4/10 (Italy)
Game Informer	6/10
GameRevolution	4/5
GameSpot	4/10
GamesRadar+	2.5/5
IGN	7.9/10 (Italy)
Joystiq	2/5
Polygon	4/10

Moebius: Empire Rising received mixed reviews from critics. Critical aggregator GameRankings calculated an average score of 60%, while Metacritic calculated a weighted score of 54/100.

How well the game sold is not known precisely. In 2016, Jane Jensen announced that Pinkerton had no games currently under development and the website was closing. She wrote that Moebius and Gabriel Knight: 20th Anniversary Edition had not sold well enough to justify continued development. Robert Holmes said in a 2023 interview that he and Jensen had ultimately invested a lot of their own money to get their initial two projects to completion, but concluded that their existing model was not financially viable.
