= Jane Jensen (video game designer) =

American video game designer and author (born 1963)

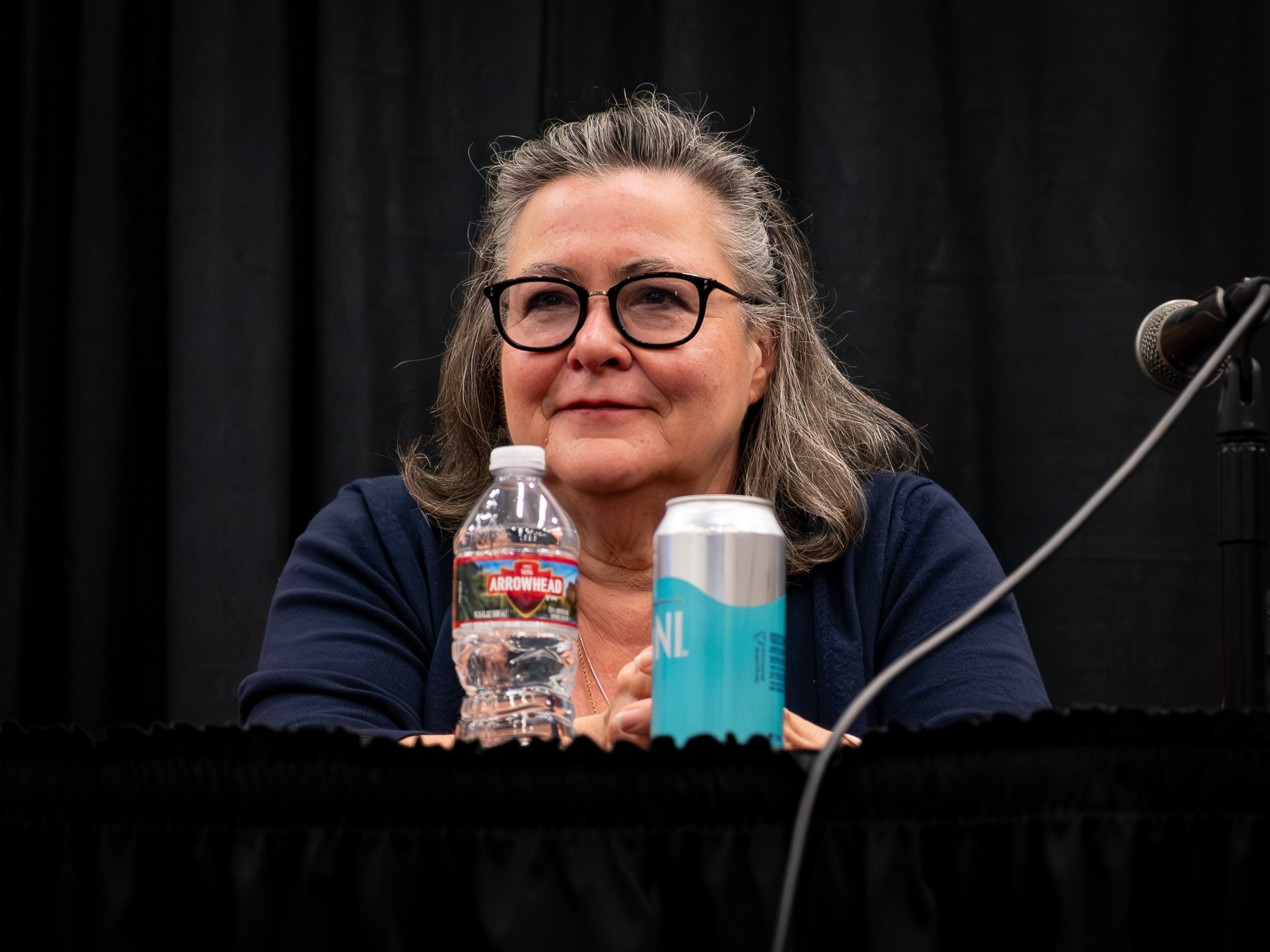
- Jensen in 2024
- Born: Jane Elizabeth Smith; January 28, 1963 (age 63); Palmerton, Pennsylvania, U.S.
- Education: Anderson University (BA)
- Occupations: Video game designer; video game writer; video game director; novelist
- Known for: Gabriel Knight series
- Spouse: Robert Holmes

Jane Jensen (born January 28, 1963) is an American video game designer and author. She is the creator of the Gabriel Knight series of adventure games, and also co-founded Oberon Media and Pinkerton Road video game development companies. Jensen also writes under the name Eli Easton.

"The Gabriel Knight series is one of the most beloved franchises in the adventure game genre," Adventure Game Hotspot wrote in 2023.

== Early life and education ==
Jensen was born Jane Elizabeth Smith, on January 28, 1963, in Palmerton, Pennsylvania, the youngest of seven children. She read horror fiction extensively since her teen years. She attended and graduated from Allentown Central Catholic High School, and then received a BA in computer science from Anderson University in Anderson, Indiana.

== Career ==
She worked as a systems programmer for Hewlett-Packard.

Her love of both computers and creative writing eventually led her to the computer gaming industry and Sierra On-Line, where she worked as a writer on Police Quest III: The Kindred and EcoQuest: The Search for Cetus. Veteran game designer Roberta Williams, co-founder of Sierra On-Line and creator of the first graphic adventure game, Mystery House, selected Jensen to co-design King's Quest VI: Heir Today, Gone Tomorrow. Jensen wrote the text and dialogue, which were highly praised in reviews.

=== Gabriel Knight ===
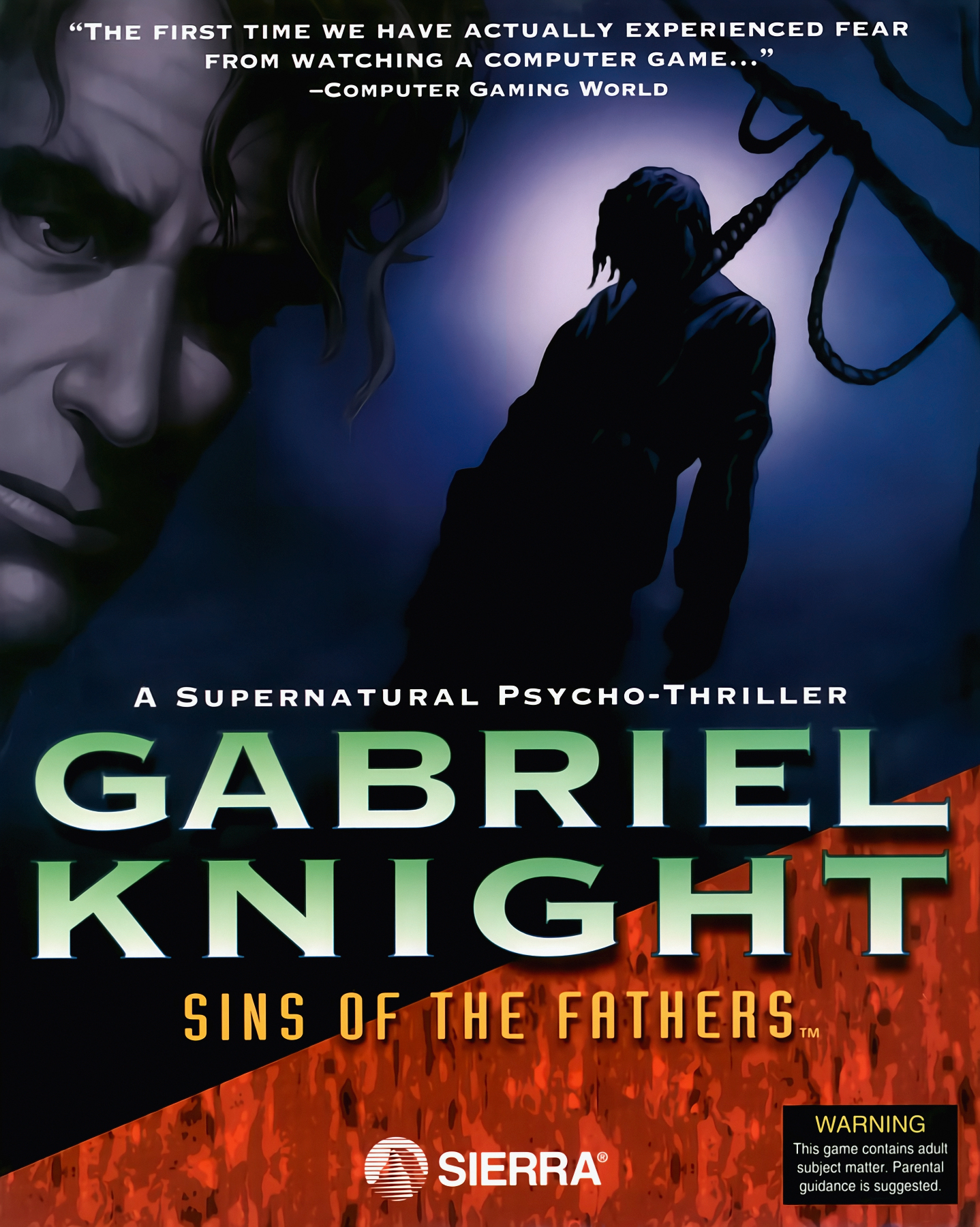
Gabriel Knight: Sins of the Fathers (1993)

Jensen's first solo game, Gabriel Knight: Sins of the Fathers, was released in 1993. The dark, supernatural mystery was a departure for Sierra but the game was enthusiastically received, with the strength of Jensen's writing, along with the game's horror and gothic sensibilities coming in for particular praise from the gaming press and earning the Computer Gaming World's "Adventure Game of the Year" award.

Jensen followed up Gabriel Knight: Sins of the Fathers with two sequels: The Beast Within: A Gabriel Knight Mystery in 1995 and Gabriel Knight 3: Blood of the Sacred, Blood of the Damned in 1999. Somewhat unusually for an adventure game series, each Gabriel Knight title was produced in an entirely different format to the others. Whereas the original was a traditional 2D animated game, the sequels were realised through full motion video and a custom built 3D engine, respectively. Despite further acclaim for Jensen's design in both cases (The Beast Within was also Computer Gaming World's "Game of the Year"), the large expenses associated with making the sequels, coupled with the declining marketability of adventure games (especially within Sierra) meant that a fourth in the series was not commissioned.

Jensen wrote her own novelizations: Sins of the Fathers in 1997 and The Beast Within in 1998.

In a June 2024 YouTube interview with Daniel Albu, Jensen said that she had written the first chapter of a new Gabriel Knight story, so that GK4 and GK5 were in the works. She told him that she had attached some art for it and that "the licenses are with Microsoft." In November, 2024, Jensen published the downloadable illustrated short story "Five Hearts", in which Knight investigates a mysterious dagger, on her husband's website.

=== Later work ===
In 1999, Jensen published her first non-adapted novel, Millennium Rising (later retitled Judgment Day). Her fourth book, Dante's Equation, was published in 2003 and was nominated for the Philip K. Dick Award.

Jensen has been involved in designing casual online games at Oberon Media, of which she is a co-founder. Her work in the hidden object/light adventure category can partially be credited with moving casual games in the direction of full adventure games in puzzle and story sophistication. An interviewer asked whether it was a big adjustment to tailor her stories to more casual gameplay. Jensen answered, "I still wanted to, and was able to, tell stories. I did a few Agatha Christie adaptations, James Patterson, and Charlaine Harris. And I did a few of those games which were my own creation. It was always tempting to work in more adventure game elements like inventory, which we did use somewhat. I've always loved puzzles, so it wasn't difficult to shift to casual games." Some of her more notable games for Oberon include Deadtime Stories (2009) and Dying for Daylight (2010). After leaving in 2011, she briefly worked at Zynga.

Jensen's next big adventure game Gray Matter was developed by Wizarbox and published by dtp entertainment in 2010. The game, originally intended to be developed by Hungarian software house Tonuzaba, switched to another developer, French company Wizarbox in 2008: as a result, the tentative release was changed and shifted to 2010. Jensen was also a story consultant on Phoenix Online Studios' 2012 adventure game Cognition: An Erica Reed Thriller.

On April 5, 2012, Jensen and her husband, musician/composer Robert Holmes, announced the formation of Pinkerton Road Studio, a new game development studio to be headquartered on their Lancaster, Pennsylvania farm. Game publisher Activision had agreed to launch Gabriel Knight: Sins of the Fathers 20th Anniversary Edition but "bailed part way through," as Jensen put it. With this announcement, a Kickstarter campaign was launched to raise funds for the studio's first year of game development. In 2014, Pinkerton released the anniversary Gabriel Knight and Moebius: Empire Rising, but sales were too poor for the company to continue. In 2023, Jensen told Adventure Game Hotspot, "It's a shame, because we could have done so much with Pinkerton Road. But if we do any more games, it will be with a publisher who fully finances them."

Since 2013, Jensen has written gay romance fiction under the pen name "Eli Easton". The Lion and the Crow was written for the Goodreads M/M Romance event "Love has No Boundaries" in 2013, and later expanded and rereleased as a second edition in e-book and audiobook.

Jensen told Adventure Game Hotspot, "Writing a game design and script is definitely a much more time-consuming project. I can typically do a novel in 3-4 months whereas doing a full game is at least a year. It's simpler to write a novel. No worrying about puzzles or budgets on locations... Investigations work well."

== Personal life ==
Jensen owned a farm in Pennsylvania, where she lived with her husband, composer Robert Holmes, who composed the music for the Gabriel Knight series and Gray Matter. They have since sold the farm and are currently living in the Puget Sound area of Washington state.

== Works ==
=== Games ===
- EcoQuest: The Search for Cetus (1991) (writer)
- Police Quest III: The Kindred (1991) (writer)
- King's Quest VI: Heir Today, Gone Tomorrow (1992) (co-designer, co-writer)
- Space Quest IV: Roger Wilco and the Time Rippers (1992) (CD-ROM version) (voice actor)
- The Dagger of Amon Ra (1993) (CD-ROM version) (voice actor)
- Gabriel Knight: Sins of the Fathers (1993) (designer, director, writer)
- Pepper's Adventures in Time (1993) (designer)
- The Beast Within: A Gabriel Knight Mystery (1995) (designer, writer)
- Gabriel Knight 3: Blood of the Sacred, Blood of the Damned (1999) (designer, writer)
- Inspector Parker (2003) (designer)
- BeTrapped! (2004) (designer)
- Agatha Christie: Death on the Nile (2007) (designer, director)
- Agatha Christie: Peril at End House (2007) (designer, director)
- Women's Murder Club: Death in Scarlet (2007) (designer, director)
- Dr. Lynch: Grave Secrets (2008) (designer, director)
- Women's Murder Club: A Darker Shade of Grey (2008) (designer, director)
- Agatha Christie: Dead Man's Folly (2009) (creative director)
- Women's Murder Club: Twice in a Blue Moon (2009) (designer, director)
- Deadtime Stories (2009) (creator, designer, director)
- Gray Matter (2010) (designer, writer)
- Dying for Daylight (2011) (designer, director)
- Hidden Chronicles (2012) (co-writer)
- Lola and Lucy's Big Adventure (2012)
- Cognition: An Erica Reed Thriller (2012–13) (story consultant)
- Moebius: Empire Rising (2014) (creator, designer, director, writer)
- Gabriel Knight: Sins of the Fathers 20th Anniversary Edition (2014) (creative director, designer)

=== Novels ===
- Gabriel Knight: Sins of the Fathers (Roc, 1997)
- The Beast Within: A Gabriel Knight Mystery (Roc, 1998)
- Millennium Rising (Judgment Day) (Del Rey, 1999)
- Dante's Equation (Del Rey, 2003)
- Kingdom Come - An Elizabeth Harris Novel (Berkley, 2016)
- In the Land of Milk and Honey - An Elizabeth Harris Novel (Berkley, 2016)

=== Comic books ===
- Gabriel Knight: The Temptation (Phoenix Online Publishing, 2014–15)

=== As Eli Easton ===
- "A Kiss in the Dark" (2013) (a novella part of Closet Capers anthology)
- Before I Wake (2013)
- The Lion and the Crow (2013)
- Superhero (2013)
- The Trouble with Tony (2013)
- Puzzle Me This (2013)
- "Caress" (2013) (a novella part of Steamed Up anthology)
- Blame it on the Mistletoe (2013)
- A Prairie Dog’s Love Song (2013)
- The Enlightenment of Daniel (2013)
- "Reparation" (2014) (a novella part of Stitch anthology)
- Heaven Can't Wait (2014)
- The Mating of Michael (2014)
- "The Bird" (2014) (a novella part of Bones anthology)
- Unwrapping Hank (2014)
- A Midwinter Night's Dream (2015)
- "Among the Dead" (2015) (a novella part of Spirit anthology)
- The Stolen Suitor (2016)
- A Second Harvest (2016)
- Falling Down (2016)
- Merry Christmas, Mr. Miggles (2016)
- How to Howl at the Moon (2015)
- How to Walk Like a Man (2015)
- How to Wish Upon a Star (2016)
- A Second Harvest (2016)
- How to Save a Life (2017)
- Tender Mercies (2017)
- Snowblind (2017)
- Five Dares (2017)
- Desperately Seeking Santa (2017)
- Robby Riverton: Mail Order Bride (2018)
- Boy Shattered (2018)
- Family Camp (2019)
- How to Run With the Wolves (2019)
- Angels Sing (2019)
- Christmas Angel (2019)
- The Redemption of River (2020)
- Billy and the Beast (2020)
- One Trick Pony (2021)
- Schooling the Jock (co-written by Tara Lain) (2021)
- Coaching the Nerd (co-written by Tara Lain) (2021)
- Head to Head (co-written by Tara Lain) (2021)
- Betting on his BF (co-written by Tara Lain) (2021)
- The Best Gift (2021)
- Hot Seat (co-written by Tara Lain) (2022)
- Hot Wings (co-written by Tara Lain) (2022)
- Hot Pursuit (2022)
- A Changeling Christmas (2022)
- 12 Days of UPS (2022)
- How to Love Thine Enemy (2023)
- Solstice (co-written by RJ Scott) (2023)
- Equinox (co-written by RJ Scott) (2023)
- Planes, Trains and Hurricanes (2023)
- Zenith (co-written by RJ Scott) (2024)
- Season of the Witch (2025)
- The Curse Before Christmas (2025)
