= Dante's Equation =

2003 novel by Jane Jensen

- Image of paperback edition
- Author: Jane Jensen
- Cover artist: John Picacio
- Language: English
- Genre: Speculative fiction
- Publisher: Del Rey
- Publication date: July 29, 2003
- Publication place: United States
- Media type: Print (hardback & paperback)
- Pages: 496
- ISBN: 0-345-43037-9
- OCLC: 52742526
- Dewey Decimal: 813/.54 22
- LC Class: PS3560.E5919 D36 2003

Dante's Equation is a 2003 science fiction adventure novel by American writer Jane Jensen. It earned a Philip K. Dick Award Special Citation.

During the Holocaust, a genius Jewish scientist disappeared in a mysterious flash of light from a concentration camp. In 2005, unbeknownst to each other, a reporter in Los Angeles, an academic physicist in Seattle, a rabbi in Jerusalem, and a steel-hearted agent for the US Dept. of Defense are seeking his equations. They converge one night upon that same spot on the border of the concentration camp's grounds. All vanish through a micro black hole, each to reappear on a different world, where each will experience the bizarre reality of the physical rules of the multiverse.

== Background ==
The novel tells the story of the search for a law of physics, which theoretical physicists describe as a wave equation and rabbis as the attributes of Kabbalah. This principle delineates how the fifth dimension obeys a quasi-spiritual law of nature wherein Good and Evil control the lower dimensions. This insight was first discovered by Yosef Kobinski, who was interned in the Auschwitz concentration camp during World War II. Kobinski's manuscript, The Book of Torment, was written with any available materials; the pages were buried but, after the camps were liberated, recovered by a faithful follower. The equations describe a sort of Jacob's Ladder upon which souls are assigned to a new home according to their spiritual progress or regress. In the fifth dimension, data is organized like-to-like; and beings are attached to the physical location that most closely matches their souls.

A prefatory illustration, "Dante's Wheel," depicts how the characters' personalities are linked to the attributes of the divine Sefirot (as Jensen portrays them), which decide to which universes they are sent:

Dante's Wheel
| Chesed (Light/Openness) | Chochmah (Intuition) | Emotional/Intuitive | The pleasure-seeking playboy, or the New Ager: Denton Wyle, preppy, a dabbler, outgoing, eager to be liked, fearful of authority |
| Chesed (Light/Openness) | Binah (Logic) | Logical/Intuitive | The scientist, machine, or alien: Dr. Jill Talcott, "Jill the Chill," the ice-queen physicist; ambitious after a hardscrabble childhood, concerned mostly with self; wanting to return Nate's love but not allowing herself to |
| Chesed (Light/Openness) | Chochmah + Binah | Emotional/Logical/Intuitive | The morally sane student of the Humanities: likable Nate Andros, scholar of philosophy, loves Jill and repeatedly risks his life for her |
| Gevorah (Gravity/Restriction) | Chochmah (Intuition) | Emotional/Judging | The controlling, arrogantly pious conservative: Rabbi Aharon Handalman, committed to observing Orthodox Jewish laws and practices; pompous, seeing evil as part of God's Plan but himself upholding it like the Walls of Zion; emotionally distant from his wife and children; hates modern secularism |
| Gevorah (Gravity/Restriction) | Binah (Logic) | Logical/Judging | The criminal, The Establishment, the KGB: Lieutenant Calder Farris, a sociopathic military agent with DARPA's Defense Sciences Office, seeking weapons of mass destruction; determined always to be on the winning side; contemptuous of the left-wing, ungrateful, hippie science kooks whose work he relies on |
| Gevorah (Gravity/Restriction) | Binah + Chochmah | Logical/Judging/Intuitive | Yosef Kobinski, a kind and patient sage who filled his heart with unforgiving hatred when his little son was repeatedly raped and then murdered by Wallick in Auschwitz; the genius turned King of Gehenna, the loving father turned torturer |

== Plot ==
=== Book One: The One-Minus-One ===
Denton Wyle, wealthy tabloid journalist for the Los Angeles-based Mysterious World, reports yarns of the Bermuda Triangle, ufology, and the supernatural, but is obsessed with mysterious disappearances because of a childhood incident: at 10, he actually saw a friend vanish in a flash of light. When he hears about Kobinski, he travels to upstate New York, Switzerland, and eventually Poland to collect fragments of The Book of Torment. Denton's research consists mostly of asking friends to explain science and history to him ("soaking up the atmosphere," since reading is too solitary), but he will stop at nothing to solve the mystery. In Jerusalem, Rabbi Aharon Handalman, a Talmudic scholar, discovers Kobinski's name in Torah code arrays and becomes determined to learn more, but accidentally passes his interest along to the Mossad. Violently patriotic Lieutenant Calder Farris professionally attends conferences on fringe theories, investigating anything that might lead to new weapons technology from non-recognized scientific sources.

University of Washington physicist Dr. Jill Talcott and her assistant Nate Andros independently rediscover Kobinski's wave equation and call it the One-Minus-One, to describe the wave peaks and troughs. They're onto an important scientific theory. Aharon's wife Hannah urges him to visit Yad Vashem and interview other Auschwitz survivors who knew Kobinski. He learns reluctantly from an eyewitness that Kobinski and his deadly enemy, a Nazi camp guard named Wallick, disappeared in a flash of light during a prison escape.

Jill and Nate set up an experiment with positive (One) and negative (Minus-One) radio wave pulses, which over the months demonstrate surprising results. As they increase the One pulses to 50%, 75%, and 90%, they discover that their fruit samples don't decay, that their lab mice procreate and their own sex drives grow, that a virus in a petri dish is inhibited, and that good luck increases dramatically. When they turn the pulse to the negative, however, their bad luck spreads correspondingly: they grow ill, students die in car accidents, their lab samples rot, and then their lab explodes. Jill winds up in the hospital with the flu, and Nate is followed by Calder's henchmen.

Aharon finds in the Torah codes, adjacent to 400 appearances of Kobinski's name, such phrases as "weapon of obliteration," "weapon loosing demons," and, eventually, dozens of incidences of "Jill Talcott." He flies to Seattle when he hears about the explosion. When Calder is told of it, he also flies to Seattle, to recruit Jill in order to take control of any military applications of the equation. She is about to accept his job offer when she is kidnapped from the hospital by Mossad agents; Nate rescues her, and they meet Aharon, who tells them what he has found in the Torah arrays. The three agree to fly to Poland together to visit camp survivor Anatoli Nikiel, who has the complete manuscript, and there they find Denton. Gun-toting Calder shows up that night in pursuit, and in yet another irruption of the One-Minus-One, all five enter Kobinski's black hole and vanish into different universes.

=== Book Two: On Jacob's Ladder ===
Nate has argued to Jill that Earth's universe has a 50/50 ratio of good to bad luck. (Note: Jensen demonstrates our acceptance of this principle through several common idioms, such as: "There's no such thing as a free lunch." "There's always a catch." "Every cloud has a silver lining." "Things will get worse before they get better." "The pendulum always swings back." "It's always darkest right before the dawn." "It sounds too good to be true." "Some people have all the luck." People have a sense of what is right and what is fair.) The four universes wherein they arrive embody the notion, where the percentage of good or bad luck can also be construed as lesser or greater wells of gravity. All five characters land on worlds with sentient communities, where their personalities match the society.

Denton lands in a 60–40 universe, on a world of vibrantly colorful scenery with humanoids whose language he learns. They forage for food a few hours of the day, leisurely like himself, enjoying a local form of booze, copulating often with anyone, safe in their gorge from the monsters whom Denton occasionally hears roaring. There are mysteries for him to solve, though, because he finds a clearing with blood-soaked trees, and the sylph-like natives hold a weekly grieving ritual which they won't explain. The natives call him allook saheed, "gift of God," as they do with his best friend, who has a withered hand, and as with the most beautiful of them all, an outcast woman named Eyanna whom Denton intensely desires to befriend.

Calder finds himself in a 40-60 universe (20% unluckier than Denton's) and in the middle of a war. Like Denton, he must learn the language, but it is a military-based society much harsher than the ideal he had dreamed of whipping America into. Since he is already a hard-bodied soldier, he is given the social class rank of Silver thanks to his white skin and blue eyes, but he must conceal other differences. Whereas he used to instill paranoia into ordinary Americans with his cold, threatening demeanor, here he is afraid of every experience and terrified of exposure. Calder thinks at first that he is still on Earth with a head injury and amnesia, but the world is too cold and dark, and the few books he is permitted to read speak of only four planets in the solar system. When a malcontent in the city sprays graffiti that warns of "aliens among us!", Calder knows he must escape or die.

In his 30-70 universe, Aharon needs help to move, sit, or stand in the massive planetary gravity. On this planet, Fiori, he finds Yosef Kobinski, but his delight is tempered by Kobinski's coldness toward him (and by the bloodthirsty monsters over whom Kobinski apparently rules). Aharon is offended when Kobinski tells him that he has arrived in Hell because of his stiff-necked, censorious Gevurah/Chochmah soul, and that he must change his ways: eat pork, so to speak, or the cannibalistic natives will eat him. Kobinski's friend among the creatures is Tevach, described as a huge and hulking, intelligent, mouse-faced monster, who has already learned Hebrew and can speak with them privately. When an expected power play occurs and Kobinski dies, Tevach brings Aharon safely out of the city to work on his family farm.

Nate and Jill are the most fortunate in their 70-30 universe, having been perhaps the most humane and enlightened of the characters, despite Jill's chilliness and occasional amorality. They land on a world toward the end of a vast scientific civilization. When they need water and food, they find them; when they need to learn the alien language, robots provide them with universal translators. They encounter a few of the last natives, who are tall, thin, huge-eyed creatures. Nate is excited to investigate the spaceships and find a way home; Jill wants to spend years on the computers analyzing the city. However, three events change her mind. First, a city-dweller detects that she is working on the One-Minus-One, and takes her to watch documentary footage showing that his race had also used pulse power to improve their lives, but increasing the One pulse to 100% was the same as increasing the Minus-One pulse the whole way: it destroyed almost everyone except a handful. Except for insects, it is nearly a dead world. Second, Jill follows him back to his workstation, where he explains that they are determined to provide metadata for every speck of the planet before they die out, believing that a superior race will arrive to bless the planet as a reward for such inexhaustible labor. Jill realizes the insanity of it, and sees she herself has almost been that insane. Third, the city-dweller tells her that a drone mistakenly fired upon Nate. Frantic, she runs to find him bleeding and finally expresses her love.

=== Book Three: Synthesis ===
The interdimensional travelers return to Poland and relate their experiences, their lessons learned and comeuppances. Everyone agrees that Kobinski's full manuscript and the One-Minus-One must be buried for as long as possible.

== Themes ==
- One-Minus-One / One-Plus-One Wave - The equation for good and evil; more specifically, a wave that, when it overlaps with the gravity waves of matter and probability waves, works to alleviate negative happenings (troughs) and to blunt positive happenings (peaks).
- Good and evil - Yosef Kobinski theorizes that the two are balanced in the Fifth Dimension and that they rule the multiverse in all places in which sentient life and morality can be understood by humans who visit there.
- Many-worlds interpretation - Jill Talcott, the physicist, is the last of the characters to believe that parallel worlds might exist; she learns otherwise when she and Nate (and the other main characters) use Kabbalistic physics to be sent to a parallel, futuristic planet.
- Kabbalah - An important set of esoteric teachings which drives some of the Jews in the novel and which eventually influences or affects all of the main characters.
- Unrequited love - Hannah Handalman loves her husband, who is too self-obsessed to understand her needs; Nate loves Jill, who is terrified of intimacy, although at times she expresses a returned lust.
- Cryptanalysis - Rabbi Aharon Handalman finds worrying evidence in the Torah that Kobinski might have created a terrifying new weapon; Calder Farris hopes very much to find that Kobinski did create one which could destroy all enemies of the United States.

== Literary significance and reception ==
Jeff Zaleski gave this novel a mixed review for Publishers Weekly: "Jensen is on surer ground describing Kabbalah and Holocaust history than she is plotting supernatural adventures, which unravel by the end. But she gets points for the innovative, multifaceted story". Frieda Murray was more positive in her review for Booklist: "The book plays out as it has begun, in rather standard thriller fashion. Jensen keeps it moving, though, and her characters, if not always sympathetic, are fully developed. In this, her second novel, she gives lessons in style to many thriller writers with longer publication lists". Kirkus Reviews was also somewhat mixed in their summary, describing the novel as "intriguing and often surprising, but what with a plot that doesn't add up and (with one exception) a nasty bunch of characters: mostly a tough slog".

Marian Kester Coombs in her review for Human Events was much more positive, saying, "the writing is felicitous--sometimes humorously colloquial, sometimes Virginia-Woolfish in the subtlety of its aperçus--and the momentum is energetic throughout (too often such heady plots lose steam and end up chugging wearily into the station for the obligatory finale). The wide range of believable (and mostly likable) characters remains alive and kicking. Jensen is particularly good at animating male characters, but her Dr. Jill Talcott is a memorable creation here".

Fiona Kelleghan gave the novel a rave review in The Washington Post, saying that Jensen writes "confidently and enthrallingly" and that the novel "deserves to take its place...in a Hugo nomination line-up": "Babe scientist Jill Talcott and her delightful lab assistant Nate stumble onto an equation with literally world-shaking implications, and their unexpected alliance with a playboy tabloid journalist and an Orthodox rabbi endangers all four and their murderous Department of Defense pursuer. Equally assured at mathematical speculation and kabbalistic cosmology, the novel is fast-paced, suspenseful, and a joy from beginning to end".

Victoria Strauss of the SF Site thought that the novel "has more the feel of a thriller than science fiction" but that "not so many thrillers, either, are as character-driven as this one. ... Fast-paced, suspenseful, and intellectually engaging, Dante's Equation is thoroughly enjoyable reading. Anyone who was tempted to hurl Dan Brown's wooden and overhyped The Da Vinci Code across the room might want to give this book a try; if you're looking for a well-written thriller full of religious symbology and exciting action, this is the real thing".

Jane Jensen described the book as a critical and commercial disappointment.

== See also ==
- Tree of life (Kabbalah)
- Biblical code
- Dante Alighieri
- Superweapon
- Reincarnation in popular culture
