= EcoQuest: The Search for Cetus =

1991 video game

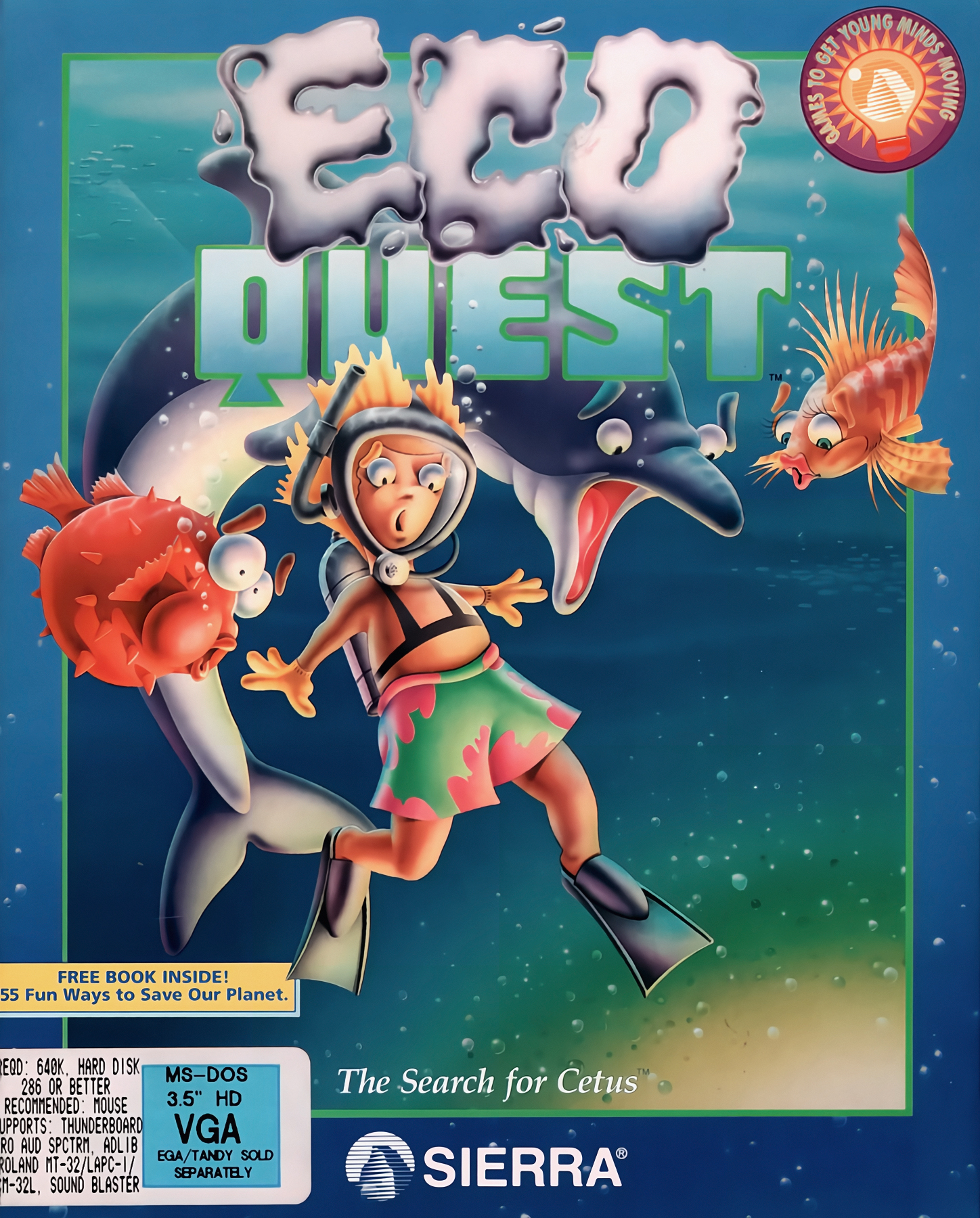
- Developer: Sierra On-Line
- Publishers: Sierra On-Line; Coktel Vision
- Directors: William D. Skirvin; Bill Davis (creative)
- Producer: Tammy Dargan
- Designers: Gano Haine; Jane Jensen
- Programmer: Jerry Shaw
- Artist: William D. Skirvin
- Composer: Chris Braymen
- Engine: SCI
- Platform: MS-DOS
- Release: 1991 (floppy disk); 1992 (CD-ROM)
- Genres: Educational, adventure
- Mode: Single-player

EcoQuest: The Search for Cetus is an educational adventure game by Sierra On-Line. The original concept was developed by Sierra VP of Creative Development, Bill Davis. The game designers were Jane Jensen and Gano Haine. The game was planned to be ported to the Amiga and Macintosh, but those versions were never published. A sequel, Lost Secret of the Rainforest, was released in 1993.

The last of Sierra's various Quest series, EcoQuest is designed to teach about the importance of environmental ethics. The games are considerably easier than most Sierra adventures and cannot be lost or rendered unwinnable. Both use a fully mouse-driven version of SCI1, in the manner of Space Quest IV and King's Quest VI. The Search for Cetus was released first on floppy disk, then on CD-ROM with full speech in 1992.

== Plot ==
The protagonist is 10-year-old Adam Greene, the son of an ecologist and an expert scuba diver. Adam is trying to help rehabilitate a dolphin that his father has rescued when it begins to talk. Soon Adam and the dolphin — Delphineus — are seeking out Cetus, the sperm whale king of Eluria, an underwater kingdom populated by marine animals. Adam is assisted by creatures found in the various ecosystems of the world (which are presented in a mostly realistic fashion).

== Gameplay ==
The game presents the player with practical, narrative problems to solve (typical of Sierra adventure games of the period) combined with occasional puzzle elements similar to those found in the Castle of Dr. Brain. The Search for Cetus introduced the recycling symbol to Sierra's standard palette of command icons, giving the player bonus points for removing litter from the marine environment. The game introduces children ages 12 and up to marine biology and marine conservation by confronting them with the consequences of various human activities including: dumping of litter, releasing of helium-filled balloons, abandonment of fishing gear, collisions between vessels and marine mammals, spilling of oil and chemicals into the sea and the fertilization of algal blooms.

== Sequel ==
In Lost Secret of the Rainforest (aka EcoQuest II, though this does not appear in the game's title), the second installment in the series, Adam, now slightly older and able to speak with animals as a matter of course, explores the tropical rainforest in search of a cure of a disease afflicting the local Indigenous peoples of South America, and a way to save the rainforest from destruction. One of the game's innovations was the "Ecorder" display: a tricorder-like device Adam uses to learn about things he finds during his journey. According to Pelit, the game is somewhat harder than its predecessor and places more emphasis on the dangers of selfishness and greed, as opposed to the blight of man.

== See also ==
- Ecology movement
- Edutainment
