= Cognition: An Erica Reed Thriller =

- Developer: Phoenix Online Studios
- Publishers: Phoenix Online Studios; Reverb Publishing
- Producers: Cesar Bittar; Richard Flores; Vitek Goyel
- Designers: Cesar Bittar; Katie Hallahan
- Writers: Cesar Bittar; Katie Hallahan; Nick Bryan; Jane Jensen (story consultant)
- Engine: Unity 3D
- Platforms: Windows, OS X, iOS
- Release: Episode 1: Windows, OS X; WW: October 30, 2012 iOS; WW: Feb 27, 2013; Episode 2: Windows, OS X; WW: January 30, 2013 iOS; WW: August 15, 2013; Episode 3: Windows, OS X; WW: May 15, 2013 iOS; WW: TBA; Episode 4: Windows, OS X; WW: Sep 18, 2013 iOS; WW: TBA
- Genre: Point-and-click adventure
- Mode: Single player

Cognition: An Erica Reed Thriller is a 4-part episodic point-and-click graphic adventure game released by Phoenix Online Studios for multiple platforms. Funded through Kickstarter in 2011, four episodes were released for Microsoft Windows and OS X with the first two also for iPad. Jane Jensen, the creator of the Sierra On-Line Gabriel Knight series, was a story consultant for the development of the game.

The first episode, The Hangman, was released on October 30, 2012, and the final episode, The Cain Killer, was released on September 19, 2013.

== Plot ==
The story of Cognition revolves around Boston FBI agent Erica Reed, who has the unusual ability of postcognition, the ability to see into the past of any object that she touches. At first this power can't be controlled, but, after training with an antique shop owner named Rose, Erica is not only able to control her power, but use it in different ways. From seeing brief glimpses of the past on an object to helping someone regain lost memories to combining objects to see a vision of a scene where they were together, each ability is useful to help solve each murder mystery. The only person who knows her secret is her partner, John McCoy.

Each episode focuses on a different serial killer and covers a contained story arc while continuing the overarching story of the entire game: Erica's search for the Cain Killer, who murdered her brother Scott but was never caught. After losing her brother three years previous to the start of the game, Erica is determined to track down his killer to the point of obsession. She gets taken off the case by her boss, and is moved onto others under their jurisdiction. But as the game progresses, it becomes clear that these seemingly unrelated killings all have clues that only Erica can find, meaning that someone else knows her secret and wants something from her—someone who has a grudge with the FBI. As Erica gets closer to the truth, with people around her dying and being hurt, she also gets closer to her goal of finding the Cain Killer. But she must make her choice between justice and revenge when the moment comes.

== Episodes ==
Each episode provides around 3–6 hours of gameplay.

=== Episode One: The Hangman (October 30, 2012) ===
It is three years after the death of Scott Reed, FBI agent Erica Reed's brother, and she is still on the case of his killer. Unfortunately, the director of the Boston branch, Madison Davies, has closed the file on his murder, despite Erica's protest. In the middle of the night, just as she was finishing up, her partner, John McCoy, tells her that the FBI has been called in to investigate the hanging of an unknown man.

Looking over the scene, taking evidence, and talking to other agents, Erica is able to deduce how the man died. But not everything is as it seems. Using her unstable cognitive powers, she manages to find a piece of a child's wooden toy. Urged by her partner to seek out an antiques dealer by the name of Rose, Erica begins her journey to unlocking more mysteries of her latent abilities. And finding out that the item is one part of a French toy called a Le Pendu, and that other parts are left behind by the killer as clues.

As she gathers these pieces to unlock another clue, a mysterious text is sent to her cell phone that brings to her attention an old case of a similar style. Following this trail leads Erica to Robert Goodman, the husband of the previously hanged victim. Trying to bring forth a long forgotten memory about the day she died, Erica learns her second power of regression. After sorting out the memory fragments, she uncovers the name of the murderer: Antony Longmore.

Unfortunately, it is found out that the body discovered WAS Longmore. Erica soon discovers that the next victim is her boss, Davies. After an intense shootout in a church, Davies ends up dead, her neck snapped by a noose. Erica is left wondering why she was targeted and by whom.

=== Episode Two: The Wise Monkey (January 30, 2013) ===
Right after Davies’ tragic death, Erica and other agents involved are brought in to be debriefed by the new director of the Boston branch, Samuel McAdams. McAdams was the Director there years ago, and is returning now to act as the interim director. During her grilling, both Erica and McAdams hear a noise coming from the main office and go out to investigate. Jared “Sully” Sullivan, a fellow agent with whom Erica has an on-again/off-again relationship, is seen dragged off by the new office assistant, who leaves behind Sully's severed ear and a silver musical charm. Erica attempts to pursue the kidnapper, but finds her tires slashed. She then discovers that the kidnapper was an imposter, as the real office assistant is tied up in a car next to hers.

The current case being handled by Sully, "The Wise Monkey", is now tossed into Erica's lap. The serial killer is named such due to her MO of cutting out the eyes, ears, and tongues of the victims. The killer also leaves small musical charms on their bodies. The lead suspect is a student at the Berklee College of Music, Kelsey Gardner, and the investigation revolves around trying to learn her whereabouts and what motive she could possibly have for killing the victims.

Erica goes to see the dean of the college and Kelsey's former roommate, and investigates both Kelsey's apartment and her boyfriend's (Joey Goethals) place of work and residence. During her investigation, Erica discovers that the dean is secretly using loan money to fund extravagant purchases and that Kelsey confronted him about it whereupon her life was turned upside down because of his embezzlement.

Through the use of another ability gained thanks to Rose's help, called “synergy”, Erica is able to use the six charms that she has collected up to this point together to get a vision of the same alley where “The Hangman” was killed. Seeing the past brought on by these charms, she realizes that Joey is the killer, not Kelsey. Kelsey was in fact, Joey's first victim after she broke up with him. The silver charms Erica found were all part of a bracelet that Kelsey wore, which broke apart after snagging on a chain link fence, as she attempted to get away from him. After feeling remorse over killing her, Joey began killing the people he felt had wronged Kelsey and cutting out their sense organs, so he could use them to make her perfect again. However, we also find out that he became a victim of his own modus operandi.

The final confrontation takes place at Joey's hideout, where Erica has to figure out the way to rescue Sully who's trapped and next in line to be killed. Thankfully, she manages to get inside quickly enough to save him. The end of the episode shows Joey being tossed off a balcony of the Enthon Towers apartments, onto a Police cruiser.

=== Episode Three: The Oracle (May 16, 2013) ===
Throughout the first two episodes, Erica is introduced to Cordelia Smith. She also lost a brother six years ago and is first seen confronting Erica about stealing a rose for Scott's grave at the cemetery. Getting over this quickly, they hit it off from the start and talk about their brothers. It is also discovered that Cordelia lives at the Enthon Towers and that she was afraid that someone was out to get her. Through subterfuge, Erica manages to send a police car to keep tabs on the place.

The entirety of The Oracle takes place at the Towers and the player is constantly shifting between Cordelia's past and Erica's present. It is revealed very early on in the episode that Cordelia is also a psion, with the power of precognition (she can see the future). It is also revealed that she is the one that killed off Longmore, Davies, Goethals, and kidnapped Sully.

Erica tries to enter the Towers, but is blocked from doing so by McAdams and an elderly man by the name of Skorobeus. Managing to sneak in, she goes looking for McCoy who went investigating the death of Joey Goethals. From this point forward the episode has many flashbacks of what happened six years ago to the Smith family. For they owned the Towers and this tells the tale of how Max Smith died at the hands of Cordelia.

In her visions of the future, Cordelia saw herself shooting and killing her brother. She goes to the FBI and begs John McCoy to help because the agents investigating Max, Davies and McAdams, don't believe her. Through a series of four flashbacks where the player controls Cordelia and investigates the penthouse in the present as Erica, we discover that Skorobeus and Max are involved in some financial disputes. It is eventually revealed that Cordelia's other brother, Keith, is in fact elder gentleman's son, though he does not know this.

Following a hidden pathway to a sub-basement level, Erica confronts John who admits to knowing everything that happened leading up to her brother's death at the hands of the killer and demands to know why he didn't say anything. Discovering Keith's heavily injured and bandaged body chained up in the room, they find out that Cordelia had kept him down there to do her dirty work to get Erica involved. After releasing him, Erica finds out that Keith is the Cain Killer that Erica has been searching for the past three years (and three episodes). His injuries are from a confrontation three years ago, during a struggle with Erica.

The episode ends as Erica accidentally shoots John, caught in the fear that her vision of herself getting shot by an shadowy figure was coming true.

=== Episode Four: The Cain Killer (September 19, 2013) ===
The series finale starts off with a flashback set three years ago, prior to Scott's abduction and subsequent death. On the trail of the Cain Killer, Erica and John have arrived at a warehouse and she is preparing to infiltrate a contact of Cain's to find out information on the serial killer's whereabouts. Her cover is eventually blown and she discovers, much to her horror, that Scott has been taken by Cain and is waiting for her arrival to complete his macabre scene. She rushes to the cemetery, and since what follows has already been dealt with at the beginning of the first episode, the scene fades to Scott's funeral.

Fade to Cordelia's point-of-view. She tracks Keith to an old family lake house and tries to figure out how to confront him for she knows what he's done and will do. Having already met his flaming fate at the hands of Erica, burn scars are all over him and he's in the bathroom trying to clean up. Cordelia looks around and finds implements of his MO and grabs some powder to subdue him. Knocking him out, she takes him away.

In the present day we see a vision of Erica and Cordelia talking. After a brief kiss, Cordelia tells Erica to ask Rose about Bao Thanh. Waking up at the antique shop, Erica uses her regression ability to help solidify this memory and reveal that not only was Bao Thanh as psion but so is Rose—she can read minds. That is why she was helping both Erica and Cordelia with their abilities.

Moving on, Erica returns to the FBI station and is pulled from duty by McAdams because of what she did to John at the end of the previous episode. Furious, she nonetheless sneaks into the interrogation room and roughs up Skorobeus to find out that Keith used to work out of the Smith family lake house. Rushing over there, she meets up with Cordelia and after a tense conversation the two agree to work together to take down Keith.

Discovering his room of horrors in the basement, the two use their combined abilities of being able to see the past and future to uncover his next target: Erica's father. Before they can leave, McAdams shows up and takes Erica into custody while Cordelia gets away. Whether she can convince the director to help her or not, they end up back at the cemetery where it all started and Erica has to work with Cordelia again to save her father. In one final epic confrontation with the Cain Killer, Cordelia sacrifices her own life to take out Cain, and to save Erica from choosing revenge over justice as she once did. In the epilogue, it is revealed that Erica is leaving the FBI to look for and help other psions, and that John died after the shooting in Episode 3, though Erica appears to use her powers to talk to an image of him. She goes to see Sully in the hospital, bringing him the lunch he asked her out for, back in the first episode.

== Development ==
In 2011, Phoenix Online Studios ran a Kickstarter campaign from October 29 through December 10 to fund for Cognition. Their goal was $25,000 and they brought in $34,247 by November 21. Following the campaign, the team began developing the game, using the Unity engine.

Skype and Dropbox were used for inter-team communication. The script was written by Cesar Bittar, Katie Hallahan and Nick Bryan, and music composed by Austin Haynes. Jane Jensen acted as a story consultant, to help streamline the story, with Robert Holmes composing a song for the game. Raleigh Holmes was selected to voice Erica Reed and sing the song, "The Taking", with the Scarlet Furies.

== Reception ==
Overall, Cognition has been viewed positively, with praise given to the story, production values, audio and music. Upon release, reviewers commented on graphical issues, such as clipping issues and erratic walking animations, but these have since been patched. Erica's use of cognitive powers as a gameplay mechanic was positively received by fans and reviewers.

Critical reception generally increased as the series continued, excepting the final episode which received mixed reviews. During the online release party for the final episode, The Cain Killer, Phoenix suggested that a second season is planned.

== See also ==
- The Testament of Sherlock Holmes
- Yesterday
