= Deadtime Stories =

Deadtime Stories may refer to:

- Deadtime Stories (film), a 1986 American horror anthology film
- Deadtime Stories (2003 film), a 2003 animation short by Michael Dougherty
- George A. Romero Presents: Deadtime Stories, Vol. 1, a 2009 anthology film
- George A. Romero Presents: Deadtime Stories, Vol. 2, a 2011 anthology film sequel to the 2009 film
- Deadtime Stories (TV series), a 2012 TV series
- Deadtime Stories (novel), a series of children's horror fiction novels
- Deadtime Stories (video game), a 2010 video game
