= The Beast Within: A Gabriel Knight Mystery =

1995 video game

- Developer: Sierra On-Line
- Publisher: Sierra On-Line
- Director: Will Binder
- Producer: Sabine Duvall
- Designer: Jane Jensen
- Programmers: David Artis; Adam Bentley; Chris Carr; Steve Conrad; Bill Schrodes
- Artists: Layne Gifford; John Shroades
- Writer: Jane Jensen
- Composer: Robert Holmes
- Series: Gabriel Knight
- Platforms: MS-DOS, Macintosh, Microsoft Windows
- Release: December 1995; Mac OS July 9, 1996
- Genres: Interactive movie, point-and-click adventure
- Mode: Single-player

The Beast Within: A Gabriel Knight Mystery (also known as Gabriel Knight 2: The Beast Within) is a point-and-click adventure game, created by Jane Jensen, developed and published by Sierra On-Line, and released for MS-DOS, Macintosh, and Microsoft Windows in 1995. The sequel to 1993's Gabriel Knight: Sins of the Fathers, the game's story focuses on a new investigation for Gabriel Knight, adjusting to his new life as a "shadow hunter" as he investigates a spate of killings around Munich believed to be the work of a werewolf. His work is assisted by Grace Nakimura, who looks into a link between the killings and the final years of a Bavarian king in the 19th century.

Unlike its predecessor, the game was designed like an interactive movie, produced entirely in full-motion video – a technology that was popular at the time for game production but expensive to use – with computer-generated scenery used for locations in the game, and a strict filming and voice-over schedule. In addition, the involvement of live-action scenes required a recasting of the main characters, with Dean Erickson and Joanne Takahashi portraying the lead roles, both of whom are playable during the story at different intervals.

The Beast Within garnered critical praise for its storytelling and characterization, as well as its presentation, but was not a commercial success as Jensen hoped for. Despite this, it received a sequel, Gabriel Knight 3: Blood of the Sacred, Blood of the Damned, in 1999.

== Gameplay ==
Gabriel Knight standing inside the Huber farm. The taskbar at the bottom displays the inventory, the current active object, and a set of options.

The Beast Within is a point-and-click adventure game, played from a third-person perspective; a first-person perspective is used at some points during the game. The story is divided into six chapters that plays out in a linear fashion, all of which is conducted between the two playable characters – half involve Gabriel, and the other half involve Grace. In each chapter, players must complete a set of required actions in order to advance the story, but may do so in a non-linear fashion, and can conduct optional actions that can provide background on the game's story and events. Each chapter features a variety of locations that the player can visit, some of which involve an overhead map which uses a hint system to highlight key locations that have actions to be performed in the chapter. With Sierra games of the time, a running score is used to keep check on actions, both required and optional, that players have completed (i.e. acquiring an object needed for a puzzle).

In each location, the player can move the cursor to find items to interact with or places where they can move to another spot or site. Unlike Gabriel Knight: Sins of the Fathers, the cursor is context sensitive and will conduct an action when the player interacts with something, depending on what the interaction will involve – interacting with a person, for example, will begin a conversation. However, items collected and placed in the character's inventory, which can be examined when selected, need to be made an active item before they can be used on interactive objects. Other options include: access to a main menu to save/load a game, change settings, or quit the current game; a movie section, allowing players to replay movies unlocked during the game; and an option, available until the final chapter, to look back over previous conversations as Gabriel, or review notes made by Grace. Conversations focus on a series of topics, with additional ones becoming available as the player makes progress on the story. In some situations, the player must overcome a dangerous situation or risk occurring a game over moment, forcing them to retry, restart the game, or restore a previous save.

== Story ==
=== Setting ===
The Beast Within takes place within a world where the occult and the supernatural exist throughout human history – such as ghosts, cultists and demons. To combat those who use such forces for evil against humanity are the "Schattenjägers" – a German translation of the words "Shadow Hunters" – who take it upon themselves to defend the innocent from such beings; their origins, however, are shrouded in mystery. The plot is influenced by the mythology of werewolves, and the historical backgrounds of King Ludwig II and Richard Wagner between 1870 and 1886, with the story creating fictional events concerning the relationship of the pair during that period, with the game itself taking place primarily within the city of Munich and various locales in southern Germany.

=== Characters and cast ===
Players assume the role of Gabriel Knight, portrayed by Dean Erickson, and Grace Nakimura, portrayed by Joanne Takahashi, both of whom use their own approaches to investigate a spate of killings around Munich and the background behind them. They receive some assistance in their case from Gerde Hull, portrayed by Andrea Martin; and Kriminalkommissar (Police Commissioner) Leber, portrayed by Nicholas Worth. Due to the live-action scenes used in the game, the story features a prominent cast, including Peter J. Lucas, Kay E. Kuter, Richard Raynesford, Wolf Muser, Fredrich Solms, Clement von Franckenstein; Bruce Ed Morrow, Judith Drake, Greg Bennick, Brad Greenquist, and Michael Wilhelms.

=== Plot ===
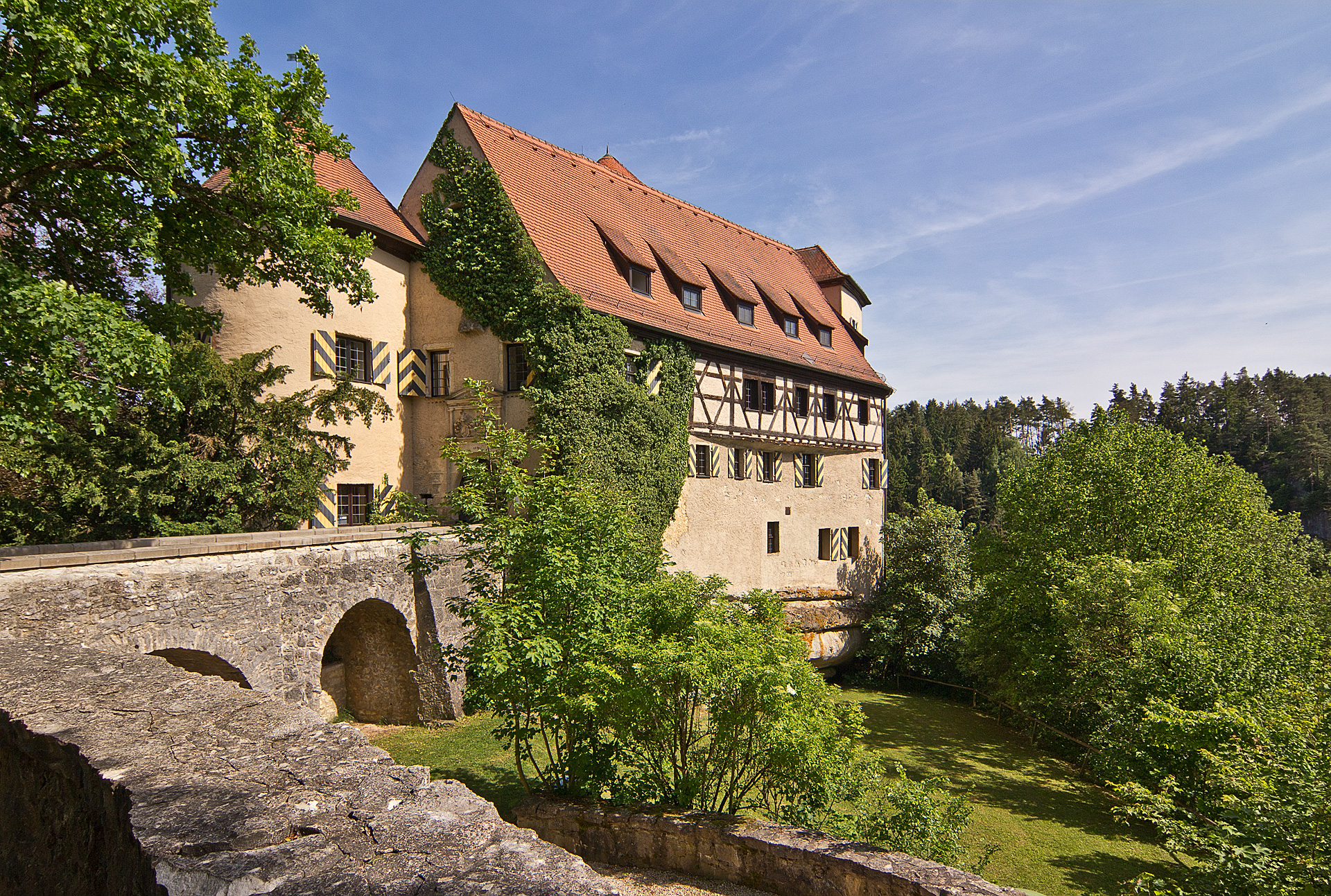
Rabenstein Castle, used in the game as the setting for Castle Ritter

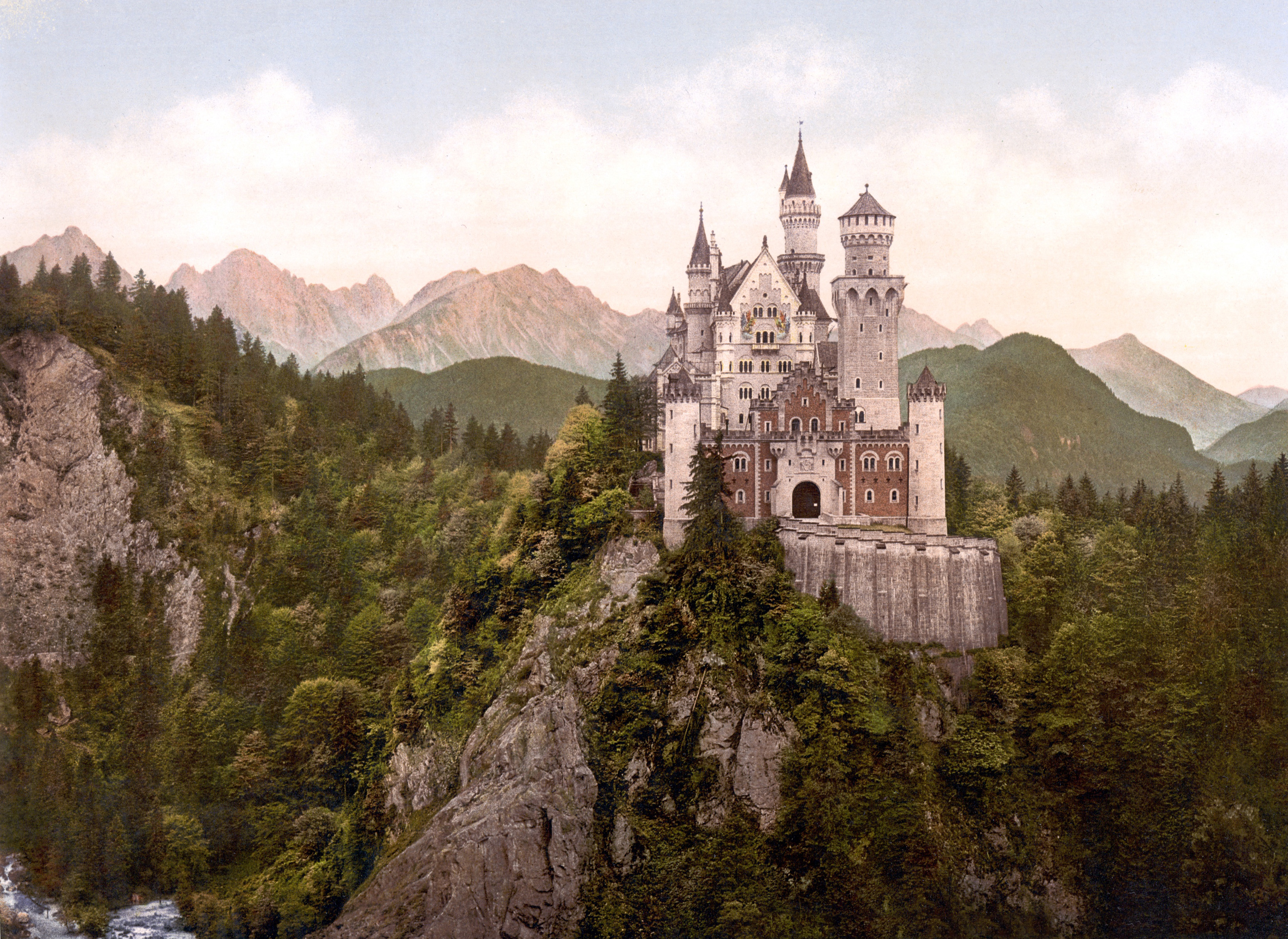
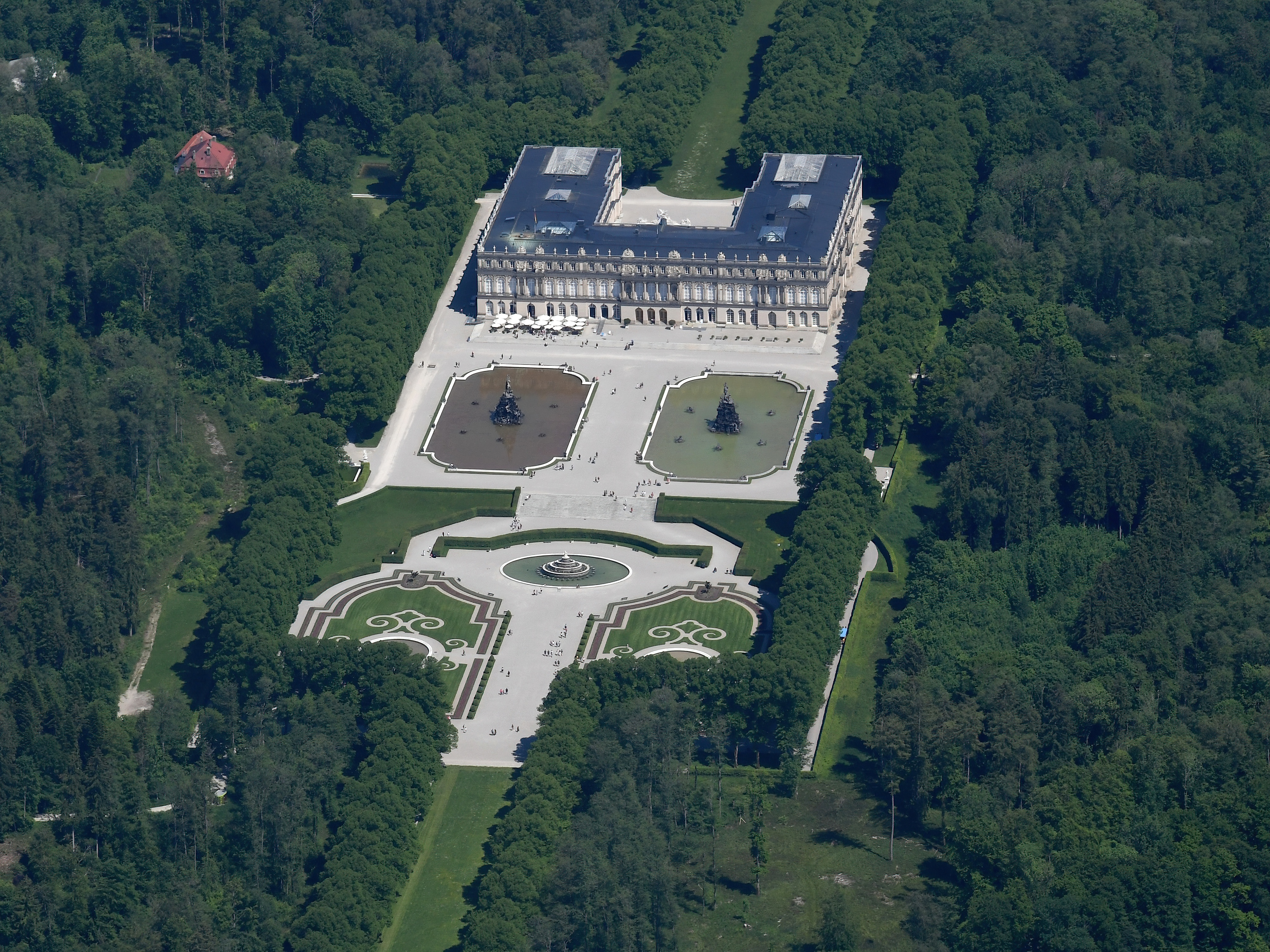
The real-life locations of Neuschwanstein Castle and Herrenchiemsee Castle were used in the game's story.

Novelist Gabriel Knight has taken over residency of his Ritter family's ancestral castle Schloss Ritter in Rittersberg, Germany, after writing a bestseller novel entitled The Voodoo Murders based on his experiences from the previous year in New Orleans (Sins of the Fathers). While seeking inspiration for a new manuscript, Gabriel is still adjusting to his new responsibilities as the latest Schattenjäger ("shadow hunter") – a role his ancestors have assumed in combatting supernatural evils. One night, the local citizens ask Gabriel to investigate a mysterious death they believe was caused by a werewolf. Gabriel asks Gerde Hull, caretaker of Schloss Ritter, to do research on the matter while he investigates the crime scene in Munich.

In Munich, Gabriel learns of recent killings that the press and local police believe may be committed by escaped zoo wolves. Gabriel's evidence however points to a wolf-like but different, larger animal as the culprit. His investigation leads him to an exclusive hunting club; its leader Baron Friedrich Von Glower, intrigued by Gabriel and noting he comes from an admirable German bloodline, welcomes him as a member.

Meanwhile, Gabriel's assistant Grace Nakimura, left to tend his bookshop in New Orleans, flies to Rittersberg upon receiving word from him about his new case. She becomes annoyed when she can't track Gabriel down and Gerde will not volunteer his whereabouts. After mistakenly concluding that Gerde and Gabriel have a romantic relationship, she grows angry and insists she take over research duties; later Grace realizes her mistake and apologizes for her behavior. Grace discovers information about the Black Wolf, a werewolf terrorizing the area centuries before, and an unsent warning about it to King Ludwig II of Bavaria. She sends her findings to Gabriel via his family lawyer.

In Munich, Gabriel is annoyed Grace has come to Germany, believing this case is too dangerous. To keep her at safe distance, he suggests she investigate Ludwig's connection. Gabriel learns that the hunting club has a philosophy that humanity has become complacent and should revitalize lost animal instincts, often through hunting and hedonism. While Gabriel comes to suspect club member Von Zell, he also develops a friendship with Von Glower.

Grace visits museums including King Ludwig II's Neuschwanstein Castle, gains access to his diary and discovers that Ludwig II suffered from lycanthropy thanks to the Black Wolf. Ludwig and Richard Wagner conducted experiments together to produce a sound combination to force a werewolf's transformation, written in an opera by Wagner. However, their plan to expose and kill the Black Wolf with the opera was halted by Wagner's death, and Ludwig hid the score sheets before being arrested on grounds of insanity, leaving the opera lost.

Gabriel partakes as the hunting club goes on a hunting trip, and he discovers proof of Von Zell being a werewolf: Gabriel witnesses him eating human remains in a forest hideout. Gabriel reveals this to Von Glower, who, horrified of what he learns, agrees to help kill him. Gabriel is bitten by the werewolf before Von Glower arrives and, hesitant to shoot, throws Gabriel his rifle. Gabriel kills the wolf before passing out, now infected with lycanthropy. Grace arrives in Munich and finds Gabriel, who is put into quarantine.

Grace and Gabriel learn Von Glower is the centuries-old Black Wolf; as the source of the curse he is the "alpha" whom Gabriel must kill to cure himself. In a letter, Von Glower discloses he infected Von Zell (who then went insane) in a failed attempt to gain a companion and used Gabriel to kill him (elsewhere it's established an alpha hurting their minion would've magically rebounded), and pleads to Gabriel as a kindred spirit, asking that he embrace lycanthropy and join him as a werewolf. Grace finds the score to Wagner's lost opera, and a great performance is arranged. With Von Glower in the audience, he and Gabriel both turn into wolves; they run to the opera house's basement where Grace and Gabriel force Von Glower into an incinerator, burning him to death and thus curing Gabriel's lycanthropy. Afterward, Gabriel mourns Von Glower, admiring the man despite his actions. He then assures Grace that he will no longer keep her at a distance during dangerous cases.

== Development ==
The game was released for PC and Macintosh. The Macintosh version uses a video player developed by Sierra instead of an off-the-shelf technology such as QuickTime, and had a tendency to crash or run slowly on 680x0 processors. There is an XP-compatible re-print on DVD with de-interlaced movies, but it was released exclusively to the Italian market.

The Beast Within has a much more involved plot than its predecessor, Sins of the Fathers. Jane Jensen said that this was because the FMV graphics "limited the interactivity we could do. I specifically tried to put a lot more intrigue in the plot, so even though the interactivity was easier, there would still be enough meat going on to keep people engaged".

The role of Gabriel Knight was re-cast, since Jensen felt Tim Curry, who voiced Knight in Sins of the Fathers, did not look the part. Dean Erickson took the part, and delivered a take on the character markedly different from Curry's. Erickson explained that "there was no way I was going to do Tim Curry, because... you know, Tim Curry is Tim Curry. He was a little more animated or maybe you could say over the top. What he was doing called for that. What I was doing called for something a little more down to earth and grounded". He clarified that "[Curry] only voiced a character and, due to the nature of animation, voices often need to be more over-the-top, because they have to impart more of everything without the visual aspect of a real, live person on screen".

To prepare for the role, Erickson intensely studied films with Southern characters and voice tapes of Southern dialects in order to make his accent sound natural. He enjoyed the role and later said that if the Gabriel Knight series had continued using live action FMV, he would have done more.

Filming for the cut scenes was done in California during mid-1995. Erickson recalled that due to video game budget constraints, the actors were expected to show up at the set prepared to give a perfect delivery; director Will Binder would not run more than two takes of any scene unless absolutely necessary. In addition, all of Erickson's narrative voice overs were recorded in a single day at a sound studio.

According to Jensen, The Beast Within badly ran over its "original modest... budget". She summarized:

"Let's just say that the struggles between budget and schedule vs. production standards vs. story and content were about as bad on GK2 as I've ever experienced, not just for three months or so, but for the entire production phase, about 18 months. For 18 months I had the Sword of Damocles - that ultimate designer threat of either cancellation or serious cuts and restructuring hanging over my head".

In Neuschwanstein, the actual paintings in the Singer's Hall were changed to correspond with the plot. The filming for the cut scenes was partly documented in the British series Bad Influence!, leading to presenter Violet Berlin having a brief walk-on cameo.

According to Todd Vaughn of PC Gamer US, the original Gabriel Knight was not as successful as Jensen had wanted. However, he noted before The Beast Within's release that "she's hoping the same attention to character development and puzzles, coupled with the new video technology, will satisfy both the hard-core puzzler and reach a broader audience".

=== Soundtrack ===
In every Gabriel Knight game, the gospel hymn "When the Saints Go Marching In" can be heard, albeit in different remixes and forms. In The Beast Within, it is heard when Gabriel is visiting the Marienplatz in Munich.

As well as creating the soundtrack for the second game alongside Jay Usher, series composer Robert Holmes wrote the music for a scene from the fictional opera entitled "Der Fluch Des Engelhart" ("The Curse of Engelhart").

== Reception ==
Reception

Aggregate score
Aggregator	Score
GameRankings	90.50%

Review scores
Publication	Score
Adventure Gamers	4.5/5
Computer Gaming World	5/5
GameSpot	8.3/10
Next Generation	4/5
PC Gamer (US)	96%
Maximum	4/5
Computer Game Review	91/94/96
PC Entertainment	4/5

Awards
Publication	Award
Computer Gaming World	Game of the Year (1995)
Computer Games Strategy Plus	Best Adventure Game (1995)
PC Gamer US	Best Adventure Game (1996)
GameSpot	Best Adventure Game (1996)

In the United States, The Beast Within was the fourth-best-selling computer game of January 1996, and the 17th-best-selling of the first six months of 1996. The game and its predecessor, Gabriel Knight: Sins of the Fathers, sold a combined total of 300,000 copies by December 1998. Leslie Gornstein of the Orange County Register wrote that these numbers were "considered a success in the world of adventures, according to Jensen". Elsewhere, Jensen expressed frustration with The Beast Within's commercial performance. She wrote that she had expected it to appeal to a large, mainstream audience, and remarked in retrospect, "I thought it would be top ten. And it was - for about a week". Jensen further commented that the game's Christmas Eve launch was a contributing factor to its underperformance.

The game was very well received by critics; at GameRankings it scores 90.50% (based on 6 reviews). William R. Trotter of PC Gamer US wrote that "The Beast Within sets a new standard — within the graphic adventure genre, at any rate — for interactive entertainment". In Computer Gaming World, Johnny L. Wilson similarly declared it "a graphic adventure benchmark".

A Next Generation critic praised the character of Grace, as well as Joanne Takahashi's "appropriately sardonic" performance in the role. He compared the game favorably to Sierra's Phantasmagoria (which uses the same engine), citing the greater amount of gameplay content and better scenery, and rated it one of the overall best graphic adventures due to its "detailed and evolved storyline with an easy to use yet sophisticated graphic system". Maximum commented that "The Beast Within is one of the few [interactive movies] which manage to grasp the attention of the player, largely due to the interesting plot that runs throughout. Graphically the game is pretty smart too, the digitised actors working well with the computer-generated [scenery] on which they're super-imposed".

=== Awards ===
The Beast Within won Computer Gaming World's 1995 "Game of the Year" award, and was named the best computer adventure game of 1995 by Computer Games Strategy Plus, and the best of 1996 by GameSpot and PC Gamer US. It also won GameSpot's "Best Story" prize. Hailing it as "one of the best adventure games ever", the editors of PC Gamer US wrote: "If it had been just a movie, The Beast Within would easily beat 99 percent of what passes for horror on the big screen these days". The staff of Computer Gaming World called it "the continuation of a brilliant tradition—the graphic adventure as art".

The Beast Within was a finalist for the Computer Game Developers Conference's 1996 "Best Adventure Game/RPG", "Best Script, Story or Interactive Writing" and "Best Use of Video" Spotlight Awards. However, these prizes went respectively to The Elder Scrolls II: Daggerfall, You Don't Know Jack XL and Wing Commander IV. In 1996, GamesMaster ranked the game 71st on their "Top 100 Games of All Time."

== Legacy ==
In 1998, The Beast Within was adapted into a novel by Jane Jensen. The novel adaptation of the first game is a straightforward adaptation of the events of the game, an approach which Jane Jensen decided, in retrospect, was not the most successful way of introducing Gabriel Knight to a literary audience. For the second novel she "threw the whole idea of the game away and started again from scratch". Both books are out of print as of 2010. As part of her 2012 Kickstarter campaign to fund a new adventure game, Jensen offered both Gabriel Knight novels as ebooks to backers who pledge $50 or more.

In 1996, Computer Gaming World named The Beast Within the 17th best computer game ever, the highest position for any graphic adventure. The editors declared Jane Jensen as "the interactive Anne Rice". In 1998, PC Gamer US declared it the 27th-best computer game ever released, and the editors wrote that it "edges out the first [game] in pure excitement and graphic splendor". In 2000, Computer Games Strategy Plus named The Beast Within one of the "10 Essential Graphic Adventures", and called it "probably the best video-based adventure game ever released". In 2011, Adventure Gamers named Gabriel Knight 2 the 3rd-best adventure game ever released.

In a 2004 retrospective review, Adventure Gamers' Dan Ravipinto called The Beast Within "one of the few computer games to actually involve personal, meaningful growth in a player-character. Easily one of the best Full Motion Video games ever made".

Writing for Vice Media in 2021, Jess Morrissette credits the game's writing, acting performances, and queer themes, calling The Beast Within a "minor masterpiece in adventure gaming".
