= Dean Erickson =

American actor

Dean Erickson (born December 5, 1958, Maine) is an actor, writer, and the founder and CEO of Bionic Capital LLC, a registered investment advisory firm. He is best known for playing Gabriel Knight in The Beast Within and Eric, Daphne's love interest and Café Nervosa waiter, in Season 1 of Frasier.

== Career ==
After graduating from Brown University, he worked on Wall Street as an options trader and risk arbitrageur.

After six years he became an actor. He starred in several lesser Shakespearean productions and later guest starred in a few episodes of Frasier as a waiter called Eric who became a love interest for Daphne in the first season.

His best known role may be starring as Gabriel Knight in the award-winning FMV video game The Beast Within. The role of Gabriel Knight was re-cast, since Jensen felt Tim Curry, who voiced Knight in Sins of the Fathers, did not look the part. Dean Erickson took the part, and delivered a take on the character markedly different from Curry's. Erickson explained that "there was no way I was going to do Tim Curry, because... you know, Tim Curry is Tim Curry. He was a little more animated or maybe you could say over the top. What he was doing called for that. What I was doing called for something a little more down to earth and grounded". He clarified that "[Curry] only voiced a character and, due to the nature of animation, voices often need to be more over-the-top, because they have to impart more of everything without the visual aspect of a real, live person on screen". To prepare for the role, Erickson intensely studied films with Southern characters and voice tapes of Southern dialects in order to make his accent sound natural. He enjoyed the role and later said that if the Gabriel Knight series had continued using live action FMV, he would have done more.

He later turned his focus to writing. He has published a mystery novel, No One Laughs at a Dead Clown, under the name DC Erickson, and a self-help book, Choose Your Story, Choose Your Life.

In 2010, he was elected to the Midcoast Maine Sports Hall of Fame.
