= Dead time (imprisonment) =

In United States legal terminology dead time is time spent institutionalized by a defendant that does not count as credit toward the defendant's sentence. An example would be time spent confined in a mental hospital while the defendant is being restored to competency to stand trial, or halfway house time pending sentencing can also sometimes be dead time.

In the United States, federal law provides that a defendant shall be given credit toward the service of a term of imprisonment for any time they have spent in official detention prior to the date the sentence commences either as a result of the offense for which the sentence was imposed or as a result of any other charge for which the defendant was arrested after the commission of the offense for which the sentence was imposed; that has not been credited against another sentence.
