= Gabriel Knight: Sins of the Fathers =

1993 video game

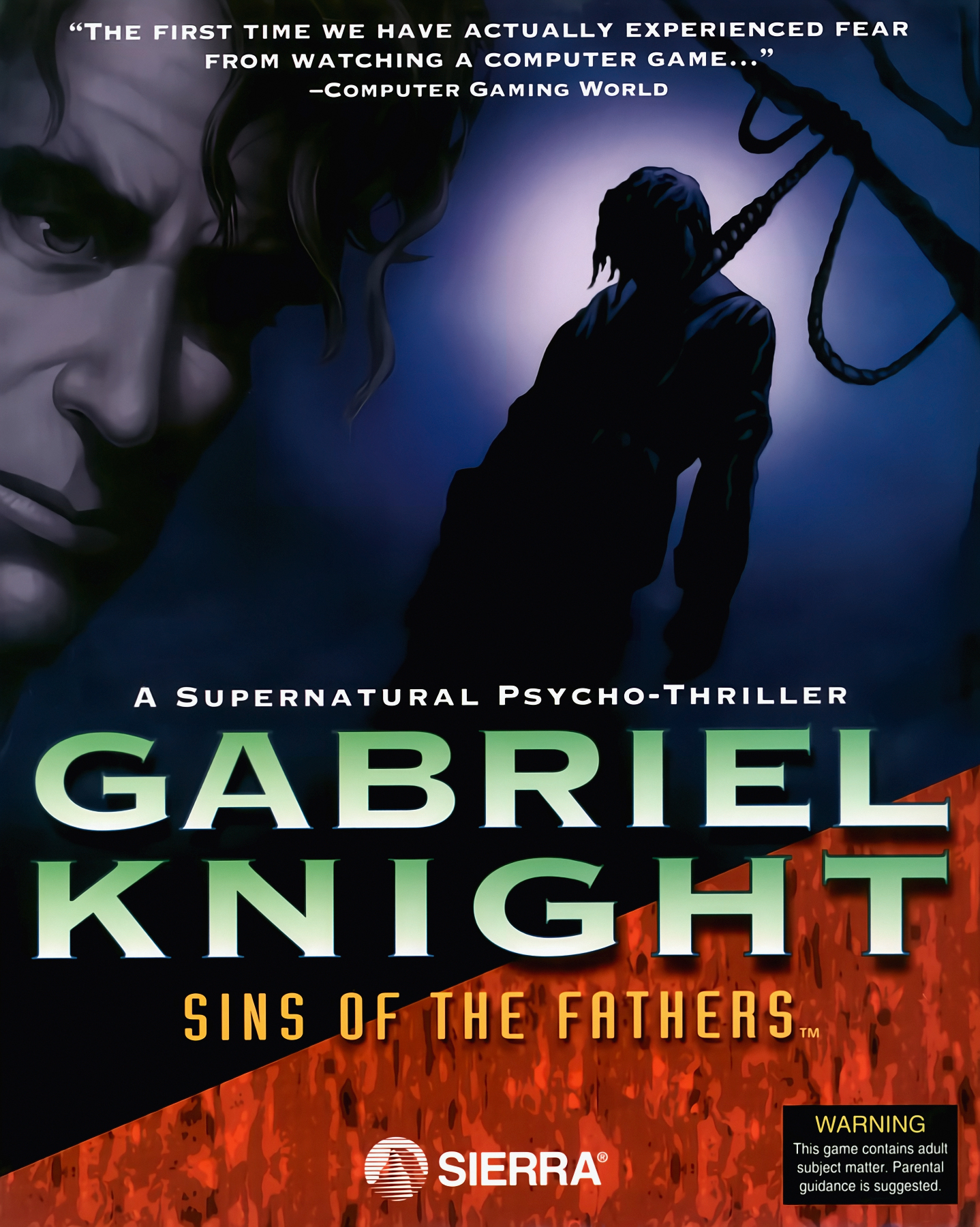
- Developer: Sierra On-Line
- Publisher: Sierra On-Line
- Directors: Jane Jensen; Bill Crow
- Producers: Robert Holmes; John E. Grayson
- Designer: Jane Jensen
- Programmer: Tom DeSalvo
- Artists: Terrence C. Falls; Darlou Gams; Gloria Garland
- Writers: Jane Jensen; Bridget McKenna
- Composer: Robert Holmes
- Series: Gabriel Knight
- Engine: SCI2
- Platforms: MS-DOS, Macintosh, Windows
- Release: NA: December 17, 1993
- Genre: Point-and-click adventure
- Mode: Single-player

Gabriel Knight: Sins of the Fathers is a 1993 point-and-click adventure game, created by Jane Jensen, developed and published by Sierra On-Line, and released for MS-DOS, Macintosh, and Windows on December 17, 1993. The game's story, featuring the voices of Tim Curry, Leah Remini, and Mark Hamill in the CD-ROM version, focuses on Gabriel Knight, a struggling novelist whose decision to use a spate of recent murders around New Orleans as material for a new novel leads him into a world of voodoo magic and the truth about his family's past as supernatural fighters.

Although the game was not a commercial success, it received favourable reviews from critics for its story and voice cast, along with its graphical presentation. The game later spawned a series, with a sequel, The Beast Within: A Gabriel Knight Mystery, released in 1995; the game also received a novel adaptation by Jensen, published in 1997.

A remake of the game to mark its 20th anniversary, Gabriel Knight: Sins of the Fathers 20th Anniversary Edition, was released in 2014 for Windows, Mac, iPad, and Android, featuring a remastering of the graphics and music, along with a new voice cast and minor changes to the arrangement of story events.

== Gameplay ==
The icon bar gameplay screenshot

Sins of the Fathers is a point-and-click adventure game, played from a third-person perspective. While its story unfolds over a linear sequence of chapters - each covering the course of a day - which have a required set of actions that must be performed to make progress, gameplay is mostly non-linear and features additional optional actions that can be conducted, some of which provide further insight into the background of the story and its setting. In tune with Sierra games of the time, a running score is used to keep check on actions, both required and optional, that players have completed (i.e. talking about a key subject with a character). This also includes locations that need to be visited, which hold the key actions required to complete a chapter. In some chapters, the player may be required to complete an action that avoids a game-over situation - like Sierra games of the time, failing to overcome a dangerous situation ends the game, forcing players to either retry, restart, or reload to a previous save game.

Unlike newer graphical adventure games that use context-sensitive cursors which conduct the appropriate action when interacting with objects and people, the game makes use of action-specific cursors which perform the required action the player needs, provided they select that action's icon from the game-bar - "WALK", "LOOK", "ASK", "TALK", "PICKUP", "OPEN/CLOSE", "OPERATE", and "MOVE". Items that can be collected from a location in the game, are stored in an inventory where they can be examined, interacted with, or combined with other items being carried. More importantly, items can be made an active icon in the game-bar, functioning in a similar manner to action icons by allowing it to be used with interactive objects in the game world.

Conversations with people differ depending on which conversation action is used: TALK functions as a short, general, interaction with most characters; while ASK functions with specific main characters, in which players can ask them about various topics. Topics are divided between Global, which lists items that can be generally asked of any main character, and Specific, which list items that can be asked of the relevant character. Any conversations can be revisited by using the RECORDER icon in the game-bar, allowing players to re-examine conversations for information they may have forgotten about. Other functions of the game bar include CONTROLS and HELP, which help to provide insight on the game functions and adjust settings. To visit other locations when leaving the current one, an overhead map is provided in most chapters, with icons representing the locations that can be visited; a HINT system is provided, allowing players to know where they need to go to complete required actions.

== Story ==
=== Setting ===
Sins of the Fathers takes place within a world where the occult and the supernatural exist throughout human history – such as ghosts, cultists and demons. To combat those who use such forces for evil against humanity are the "Schattenjägers" – a German translation of the words "Shadow Hunters" – who take it upon themselves to defend the innocent from such beings; their origins, however, are shrouded in mystery. The game's plot is heavily influenced by the history, background and mythology of voodoo – both the Americanized version found in Louisiana, and the West African version – mixing real-life elements of the practice with a number of fictionalized versions central to the story. The game mostly takes place across the city of New Orleans, but also features events within Germany in the fictional town of Rittersburg, and within Benin.

=== Characters ===
Players assume the role of Gabriel Knight, the protagonists of the story, voiced by Tim Curry, who investigates the murders plaguing New Orleans, with help from his assistant Grace Nakimura (voiced by Leah Remini) and police detective Frank Mosely (voiced by Mark Hamill). Other main characters in the story include: Wolfgang Ritter, voiced by Efrem Zimbalist, Jr.; Dr. John, voiced by Michael Dorn; Grandma Knight and Tetelo, both voiced by Linda Gary; and Malia Gedde, voiced by Leilani Jones. At times, the game features narration of certain events or examination of items by Gabriel, with these voiced by Virginia Capers.

=== Plot ===
Gabriel Knight, a struggling horror novelist who owns a book store in New Orleans, is compelled by strange nightmares to investigate a spate of killings across the city, dubbed the "Voodoo Murders", that could provide him material for a new novel. Although the police investigation into the murders led by Detective Frank Mosely, Gabriel's childhood friend, discount the voodoo elements behind the killings as unrelated, Gabriel becomes convinced they are genuine, and seeks information on voodoo from two experts: Dr. John, a curator of a voodoo museum; and Professor Hartridge, a university researcher who specializes in voodoo practice. Mosely later closes the investigation down, but not before a suspect he questions dies mysteriously following their interview, and Hartridge is murdered after discovering a link between one killing and a murder in 1810 that involved voodoo markings.

At the same time, his shop assistant Grace Nakimura, who aids him with research, fields calls for Gabriel from a man named Wolfgang Ritter, who claims to be family. Seeking answers, he visits his grandmother and learns from her that his grandfather, Harrison Knight, was a German immigrant called Heinz Ritter, revealing Wolfgang to be Gabriel's great-uncle. Contacting him, Gabriel refuses an invitation to see him at Ritter's ancestral home of Schloss Ritter in Germany to meet him, but agrees to accept a family journal from him. When he reads it, he discovers an entry concerning his ancestor Gunter Ritter, who executed a voodoo practitioner named Tetelo, after she betrayed his love for her by stealing a family talisman and using it to commit several murders. Gabriel finds these killings are identical to those of the Voodoo Murders.

Gabriel soon finds evidence that links John to the killings, but his friend Mosely disappears shortly after agreeing to re-open the case. Discovering that John is a member of a voodoo cartel in New Orleans, he decides to infiltrate the group at their next meeting. He is shocked to discover the cartel is led by Malia Gedde, a mysterious socialite whom Gabriel became infatuated with upon meeting, and to find she is possessed by the spirit of Tetelo, who recognizes him as Gunter's descendant. After narrowly escaping death, with Grace's help, Gabriel decides to leave the city for his own safety and look into his family's background at Schloss Ritter. Once there, he meets his great-uncle's assistant, Gerde, who reveals Wolfgang left before he arrived after determining where the family's missing talisman was taken to.

During his time at Schloss Ritter, Gabriel discovers that the Ritters worked throughout history as "Schattenjägers", combatting supernatural forces that threatened the innocent. Seeking to track down his great-uncle, Gabriel undertakes an initiation ritual, earning a key to the Ritter's private library. Through Wolfgang's notes, he learns the missing talisman was buried with Tetelo's remains in Africa. With this information, Gabriel travels to a burial mound in Benin, where he finally meets up with his great-uncle. Discovering he is now too weak to continue working as a Schattenjäger, Wolfgang instructs Gabriel to continue what he started and stop Tetelo, before sacrificing himself so he can reclaim the family's talisman. After sending his great-uncle's body back to Germany for burial, Gabriel returns to New Orleans, finding the city has descended into chaos in the last few days.

Gabriel finds Grace missing upon his return to the book store, with a note from Malia pleading him to flee the city. Reuniting with Mosely, who had gone into hiding, the pair infiltrate the voodoo cartel's hideout under the French Quarter, and rescue Grace. While she and Mosely escape, Gabriel confronts the possessed Malia, who slips into a fissure and clings to its edge. If the player chooses to kill Malia, she feels betrayed by him and pulls Gabriel into the fissure, killing them both, with Mosely and Grace mourning his death. If the player chooses to save her (considered the canonical option in the series), Malia realizes he loves her still and that Tetelo is too dangerous, and so chooses to kill herself, leaving Gabriel to discuss the outcome with Grace while reflecting on the new life he now has before him as a Schattenjäger.

== Development ==
Voice production
Voice director
Stuart M. Rosen
Associate producer
Jon E. Grayson
Performer	Role(s)
Tim Curry	Gabriel Knight, Gedde Butler
Mark Hamill	Detective Mosely, Jeep Driver
Michael Dorn	Dr. John
Leah Remini	Grace Nakimura
Efrem Zimbalist, Jr.	Wolfgang
Rocky Carroll	Willy Walker
Virginia Capers	Narrator
Jeff Bennett	Sam, Technical Artist, Uniform Officer, Lucky Dog Vendor, Motorcycle Cop, Bruno
Mary Kay Bergman	Gerde, Little Boy, Old Lady
Jim Cummings	Desk Sergeant Frick, Blues Band Leader, Cajun Band Leader, Jazz Band Leader, Muscle Man Pedestrian, Dragon, Gunter
Linda Gary	Grandma Knight, Tetelo
Leilani Jones	Malia Gedde
Nancy Lenehan	Magentia Moonbeam
Chris Lytton	Crash
Monte Markham	Professor Hartridge, Bartender Stonewall King, Marcus
Stuart M. Rosen	Priest, Phone Guy #5, Beignet Vendor
Susan Silo	Madame Cazaunoux
Dorian Harewood	Watchman Toussaint Gervais

The game was created and directed by writer Jane Jensen, who also worked on King's Quest VI: Heir Today, Gone Tomorrow. Jensen's husband Robert Holmes was a producer and composed the music.

The programmers for Gabriel Knight: Sins of the Father were Bob Andrews, Tom DeSalvo, Jerry Shaw, Sean Mooney, and Greg Tomko-Pavia. Graphic Designer was Nathan Gams. The artists included Michael Hutchison, Chris Willis, Darlou Gams, Deanna Vhalkee, and John Schroades. Audio Engineers were Kelli Spurgeon and Rick Spurgeon. Stuart M. Rosen worked as Voice Director.

The plot and atmosphere of Gabriel Knight: Sins of the Fathers was inspired by the film Angel Heart. Game designer/director Jane Jensen recalled that she was given a great deal of freedom in creating the game's concept: "One of the great things about Sierra was that Ken Williams really believed in the artistic vision. If he gave you the chance to do a game, that was your responsibility. Nobody told you what to do with it. If it didn't sell, then you wouldn't do another game for him, but he would let you have that freedom".

During development, Sierra's SCI game engine was upgraded to "SCI 32", and the team struggled to switch Gabriel Knight onto the new engine. Because of this, Jensen later wrote that they "fought bugs and snafus for six months. Despite this, we made our Christmas date – it just made what had been a very smooth project a bear".

== Release ==
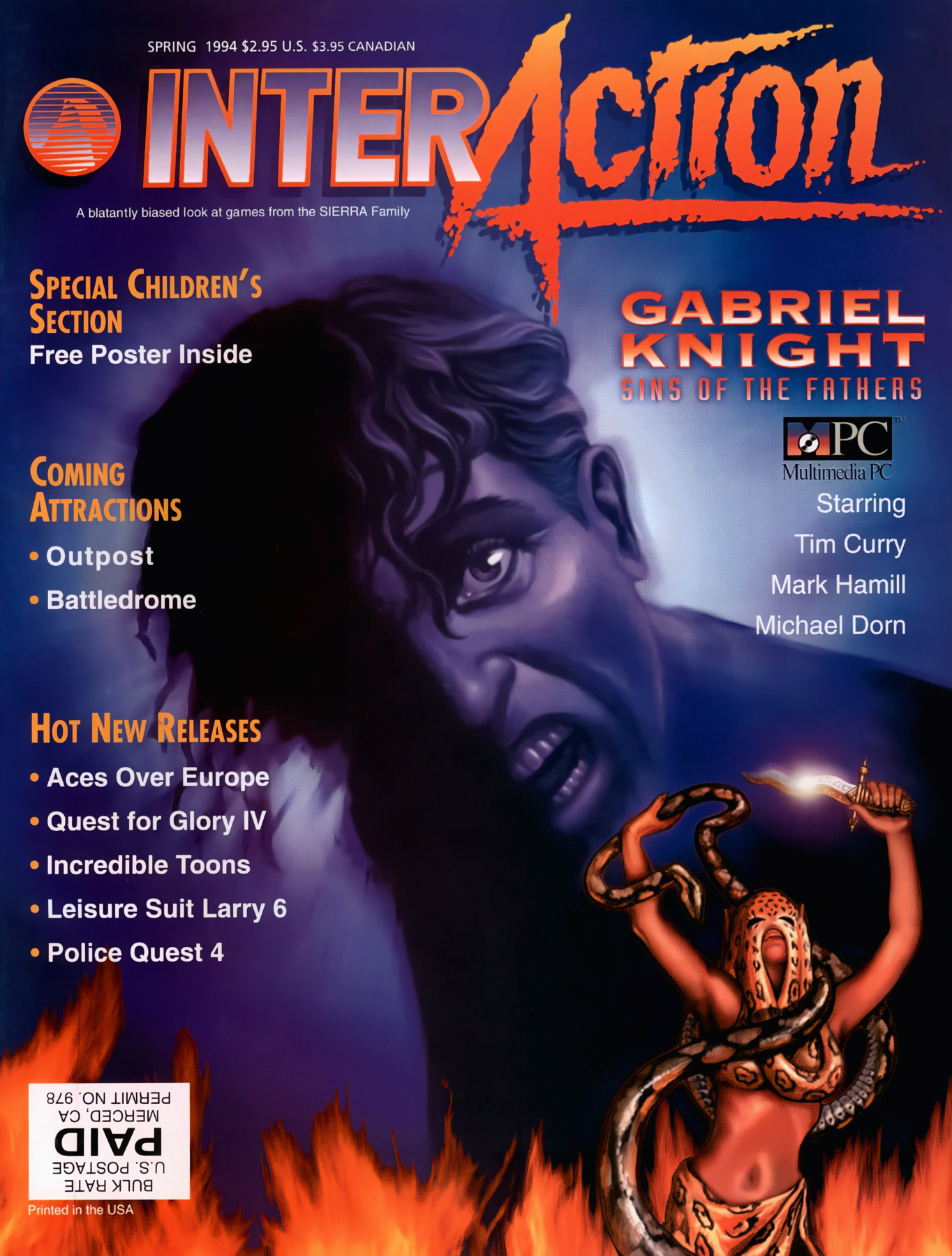
Gabriel Knight featured on the cover of Interaction Magazine

Gabriel Knight: Sins of the Fathers was first released in North America by Sierra On-Line cross-format as both a single CD-ROM disc and as a set of eleven 3.5" floppy disks on December 17, 1993. The comic book prequel included with the physical copy of the game, was later posted in Sierra Studios's page. The CD-ROM version, besides voice acting, also included video sequences that, in the floppy version were included as a sequence of still images. The game has been subsequently re-released both individually and as Gabriel Knight Mysteries: Limited Edition, a compilation with the first sequel, The Beast Within: A Gabriel Knight Mystery.

Release Listings:

MAC – Gabriel Knight: Sins of the Fathers (US) – 1994
PC – Gabriel Knight: Sins of our Fathers (US) – 1993
PC – Best of Sierra No. 1 (UK) – 1997
PC – Gabriel Knight Mysteries: Limited Edition (US) – 1998
PC – Gabriel Knight: Sins of the Fathers (Good Old Games) (US) – 2010

=== Novel adaptation ===
In 1997, Sins of the Fathers was adapted into a novel by Jane Jensen. The novel is a straightforward adaptation of the events of the game, an approach which Jane Jensen decided, in retrospect, was not the most successful way of introducing Gabriel Knight to a literary audience. For the novel adaptation of the second game she "threw the whole idea of the game away and started again from scratch". Both books are out of print as of 2010. As part of her 2012 Kickstarter campaign to fund a new adventure game, Jensen offered both Gabriel Knight novels as ebooks to backers who pledge $50 or more.

== Reception ==
Sins of the Fathers

Aggregate score
Aggregator	Score
GameRankings	93%

Review scores
Publication	Score
Adventure Gamers	5/5
Quandary	5/5
Just Adventure	A
Adventure Classic Gaming	5/5
Adventure Lantern	90/100
Power Unlimited	79%

Awards
Publication	Award
Computer Game Review	1994 Adventure Game of the Year
Computer Gaming World	Adventure Game of the Year, June 1994
CES	1993 Best of Show

Gabriel Knight was not a major commercial hit. According to Todd Vaughn of PC Gamer US, "Jensen's hope for a King's Quest-sized success fell a little short of the mark". The game and its sequel, The Beast Within: A Gabriel Knight Mystery, sold a total of 300,000 copies by December 1998.

When previewing the game in November 1993, Computer Gaming World's Johnny L. Wilson stated the opening sequence "was the first time I've actually experienced fear when viewing a computer game". He wrote that "Gabriel Knight is an exceptional blend of art, game and understanding. It is mature audiences for all the right reasons". In March 1994, the magazine's Charles Ardai stated that Gabriel Knight justified being called an interactive movie, with "audio and video that outshines any cartoon and a story that could scare the bejeebers out of Stephen King ... one of the rare titles that lives up to the promise of the overhyped tag 'multimedia'". He praised the "exceptionally well-performed game"'s voice actors, but observed that the large conversation trees reduced the horror and tension. Ardai liked how "Gabriel Knight throws the player convincingly into the world of satanism and live sacrifice, of seedy and lecherous New Orleans", predicting that "Gabriel has the makings of a first-rate series character, albeit a troubled and disturbing one". He concluded that the game "is really a preposterous bit of silliness" but "top-notch Hollywood-quality entertainment". In April 1994 the magazine said that the CD version - "the only one to own" - was "challenging and thought-provoking, an experience not to be missed, for those mature enough to handle it". Power Unlimited gave the game a score of 79% commenting: "The further you penetrate New Orleans, city of Voodoo, the more exciting it becomes. Although there is a lot of clicking and the music is very disappointing, the game is still very absorbing."

James V. Trunzo reviewed Gabriel Knight: Sins of the Fathers in White Wolf #43 (May, 1994), giving it a final evaluation of "Excellent" and stated that "Between the voodoo, graphics, music and voices, Gabriel Knight creates a New Orleans ambiance that's exciting and frightening."

In June 1994 Gabriel Knight and Day of the Tentacle won Computer Gaming World's Adventure Game of the Year award. The editors wrote that the former "introduced elements from graphic novels ... nightmarish dream sequences and a dark human story that reads and plays extremely well". Virginia Capers won the Best Female Voice-Over Acting award. The editors had expected to give the award to someone portraying a specific character but were "totally overwhelmed" by Capers as the narrator, stating that "her performance alone makes it worthwhile to purchase the CD version". In 1996 the magazine listed a zombie ripping out the player's heart as #7 on its list of "the 15 best ways to die in computer gaming".

In 2011, Adventure Gamers named Gabriel Knight the 16th-best adventure game ever released.

== 20th Anniversary Edition ==
Gabriel Knight: Sins of the Fathers 20th Anniversary Edition
- Developer: Pinkerton Road Studio
- Publisher: Phoenix Online Publishing (Phoenix Online Studios LLC)
- Series: Gabriel Knight
- Platforms: Microsoft Windows XP, Mac OS X 10.6, iOS 8.0, Android 4.0
- Release: 2014-10-15 (Mac OS, Win); 2015-07-23 (Android, iOS)
- Genre: Point-and-click adventure
- Mode: Single-player

Gabriel Knight: Sins of the Fathers 20th Anniversary Edition was made for the PC and Mac. It was developed by Jane Jensen's new studio Pinkerton Road Studios and released by Phoenix Online Studios on October 15, 2014. The reimagining includes improved graphics, a remastered soundtrack, and new puzzles and game play. A version of the game for Android and iOS was released on July 23, 2015. A Linux version was said to be coming at the time of the game's announcement but the statement was later retracted.

MP3 soundtrack was unlocked for all buyers in 2013-12-13.

=== Development ===
The development was announced when Jane Jensen solicited a Kickstarter campaign to fund development of 3 games. The Kickstarter page included a US$16 pledge level listed 'Mystery Game X', which is also included in all the exceeding pledge levels. The campaign's funding level has never reached the $600,000 needed to justify developing Mystery Game X, so the game was developed without crowdfunding campaign.

=== Adaptations ===
Series creator Jane Jensen created a 3-part comic based on the 20th Anniversary Edition video game, which took place six months after his last quest, "The Temptation". Chapter 1 was released on 17 December 2014. Chapter 2 was later released with Chapter 1 in single file. Chapter 3 was released with Chapters 1 and 2 in single file.

=== 20th Anniversary voice cast ===
- Jason Victor - Gabriel Knight
- Cissy Jones - Grace Nakimura, Madame Lorelei
- Ned Clarke - Detective Mosely
- Amy Ingersol - Malia Gedde, Tetelo
- Amy Kelly - Narrator
- Dave Fennoy - Dr. John, The Dragon
- Jeanie Kelsey - Grandma Knight
- Terry McGovern - Wolfgang Ritter
- Mark Barbolak - Professor Hartridge
- Alexandra Matthew - Gerde, Officer Franks
- Ruby Butterfield - Gunter Ritter
- Leah Russo - Magentia Moonbeam
- Adam Harrington - Desk Sgt. Frick, Willy Walker, Markus, Bruno
- Kid Beyond - Bartender, Watchman
- Brian Vickers - Sam
