= Gabriel Knight =

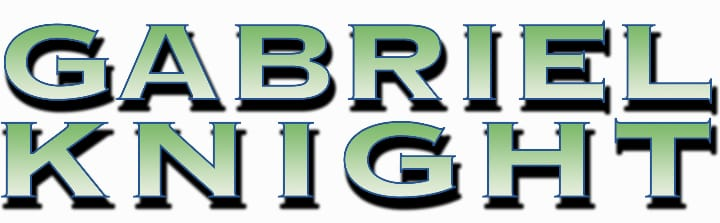
- Logo from the original game
- Genre: Point-and-click adventure
- Developers: Sierra On-Line; Pinkerton Road Studio; Phoenix Online Studios
- Publishers: Sierra On-Line; Pinkerton Road Studio
- Creator: Jane Jensen
- Composer: Robert Holmes
- Platforms: MS-DOS, Macintosh, Windows, Android, iOS
- First release: Gabriel Knight: Sins of the Fathers; December 17, 1993
- Latest release: Gabriel Knight: Sins of the Fathers 20th Anniversary Edition; October 15, 2014

Gabriel Knight is a series of point-and-click adventure games created by Jane Jensen and released by Sierra On-Line in the 1990s. The titular character is an author and book store owner in New Orleans who is investigating a strange series of murders when he learns he is descended from a long line of Schattenjäger ("Shadow Hunters"). After undergoing a spiritual trial, Gabriel becomes the new Schattenjäger, called on to stop those who use supernatural methods to threaten others. To signify this, he wears the Ritter Talisman, a protective medallion. Not having supernatural abilities himself, Gabriel mainly opposes his enemies with cunning and insight after investigation and research. In the first game, he is assisted by Grace Nakimura. In the two sequels, the two act as partners against evil, with Grace being a playable character.

The original 1993 game Gabriel Knight: Sins of the Fathers met with success and popularity, due in part to the voice cast including actors Tim Curry, Leah Remini, Virginia Capers, Mark Hamill, Michael Dorn, and Efrem Zimbalist Jr. The game was followed by two sequel games that each used a different style of game design: The Beast Within: A Gabriel Knight Mystery (1995), an interactive movie featuring werewolves, and Gabriel Knight 3: Blood of the Sacred, Blood of the Damned (1999), a 3D graphics game involving vampires. The first two games met with enough critical success that Computer Gaming World declared Jane Jensen "the interactive Anne Rice". The third game did not reach the same success and wound up being the final game published by Sierra following the decline of the point-and-click adventure video game industry.

The first two games each had a published novelization written by game creator and writer Jane Jensen. The original game was re-released in 2014 as Gabriel Knight: Sins of the Father (20th Anniversary Edition). This version had remastered graphics, sound, and new voice recordings. To celebrate its release, Jane Jensen posted a Gabriel Knight short story online, one set six months after the third game.

== Series ==
The Gabriel Knight characters and games were created by writer Jane Jensen, who also worked on King's Quest VI: Heir Today, Gone Tomorrow with veteran game designer Roberta Williams. The music in the series was composed by Robert Holmes, Jensen's husband.

All three games in the series focus on the adventures of Gabriel Knight, a financially struggling author and bookstore owner in New Orleans who discovers his true family name is Ritter and he is destined to follow the family legacy of being a Schattenjäger (German for "Shadow Hunter"). Grace Nakimura is a major supporting character in Sins of the Fathers, running the bookstore while doing research for Gabriel. The two are friends who often bicker. In the sequel games, Grace and Gabriel develop a closer relationship and act more as partners when investigating the supernatural. The second game teases their romantic feelings for each other, while the third game has them directly confront their feelings. The two sequel games make Grace a lead character alongside Gabriel and the player alternates between controlling each of them during different parts of the game.

Each game calls on the player to acquire information through investigation of surroundings and interrogation of non-player characters (NPCs). Players must also solve puzzles and complete tasks through the use of items they acquire, information they obtain, devices they activate, or provoking action in NPCs. The game's story generally proceeds linearly, with the player unable to continue into the next "day" or "chapter" or "time block" of the narrative until they have solved the required puzzles and obtained the proper information. Solving puzzles and gathering information results in the collection of points.

Gabriel Knight: Sins of the Fathers and Gabriel Knight 3: Blood of the Sacred, Blood of the Damned both included short graphic novels that contained back-story, much in the tradition of Infocom's "feelies". The Sins of the Fathers graphic novel follows the story of Günter Ritter, an ancestor of Gabriel Knight, who has left his ancestral home for the American continent in the 17th century. The Blood of the Sacred, Blood of the Damned graphic novel acts as a prologue to the game, explaining how Gabriel began the case.

=== Gabriel Knight: Sins of the Fathers ===
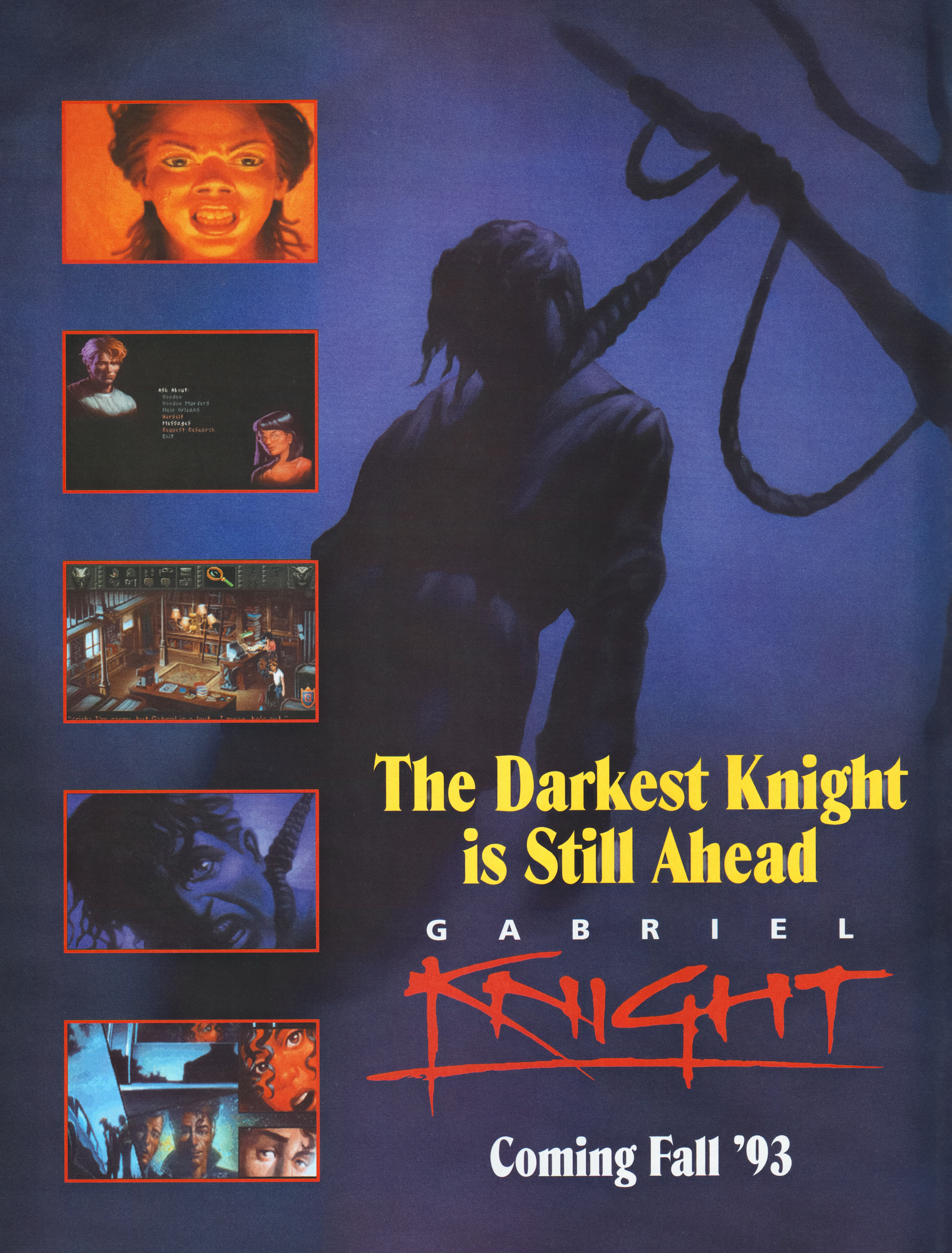
Magazine ad for Gabriel Knight: Sins of the Fathers

The first game in the series is a point and click adventure done in third-person style, with comic book style art used for story cut scenes. While the floppy version of the game only included subtitles, the CD-ROM version featured a cast of voice actors. Tim Curry plays Gabriel Knight, Mark Hamill plays his old friend Detective Franklin Mosely, Leah Remini plays his assistant and friend Grace Nakimura, and Leilani Jones as Malia Gedde. Other characters include Efrem Zimbalist, Jr. as Wolfgang Ritter, Gabriel's great-uncle, Michael Dorn as Dr. John, a proprietor of a voodoo museum, and Mary Kay Bergman as Gerde Hull, the caretaker at Gabriel's ancestral home Schloss Ritter in Germany. The narrator is Virginia Capers.

This game introduces Gabriel Knight, a financially struggling horror novelist who owns a bookstore in New Orleans called St. George's Rare Books. His friend Detective Mosely is investigating series of homicides dubbed "The Voodoo Murders" by the press. Compelled by strange nightmares and thinking the murders may give him good material for a book, Gabriel begins his own investigation, aided by his assistant Grace Nakimura. This leads him to meet mysterious New Orleans socialite Malia Gedde, as well as learn much about the history of voodoo. During the investigation, Gabriel realizes genuine supernatural practices are involved and learns he is related to the Ritter family, making him the latest in a line of Schattenjägers ("Shadow Hunters") who are meant to fight those who use supernatural methods to threaten innocent lives.

The 20th anniversary remake edition featured Jason Victor as Gabriel Knight, Cissy Jones as Grace Nakimura, Ned Clarke as Detective Mosely, and Amy Kelly as the Narrator.

=== The Beast Within: A Gabriel Knight Mystery ===
The second game (also known as Gabriel Knight 2: The Beast Within) is in the style of a live-action interactive movie, starring Dean Erickson as Gabriel Knight and Joanne Takahashi as Grace Nakimura. Grace is now a playable character for portions of the game. The character Gerde Hull is back as an NPC, portrayed by Andrea Martin.

A year after the events of Sins of the Fathers and after undergoing the spiritual trial necessary to become a Schattenjäger, Gabriel has moved to his ancestral home in the small village of Rittersberg in Bavaria, Germany to write his new novel and connect with his family lineage. His new book The Voodoo Murders, a fiction murder mystery based on the events of the first game, is now a best-seller. The people of Rittersberg, the seat of the Schattenjägers, ask for Gabriel's help when there is talk of a werewolf attack in Munich. Gabriel investigates and Grace comes to Germany to help him, determined to fight evil alongside the Schattenjäger and now experiencing visions and dreams of her own. Gabriel develops an unusual friendship with Baron Friedrich Von Glower, who leads an exclusive hunting club in Munich and believes Knight is a kindred spirit.

=== Gabriel Knight 3: Blood of the Sacred, Blood of the Damned ===
This game uses 3D rendered graphics and features the return of Tim Curry to the role of Gabriel Knight. Grace is once again a playable character, now voiced by Charity James. Detective Franklin Mosely returns to Gabriel's life, now voiced by David Thomas.

Years after the events of the second game, Gabriel has published another successful book called The Brutal Beast, based on his experiences in the previous game. He now considers himself a full-time Schattenjäger and Grace is his full partner, having created a computerized Schattenjäger archive called SYDNEY. The two are asked by the exiled Prince James of Albany to protect his newborn son from a centuries-old family threat that may involve vampires. That same night, the boy Charlie is kidnapped and Gabriel follows the kidnappers to the mysterious French village of Rennes-le-Château. Gabriel's arrival coincides with that of a visiting tour group supposedly hunting for a legendary local treasure that may be linked to the Roman Catholic Church, the Knights Templar, or the Holy Grail. Gabriel and Grace investigate the case alongside Mosely, who arrived with the tour group. After finding and rescuing the child, Gabriel discovers the origin of the first Schattenjäger. At the end of the game, Grace leaves Gabriel's side to find her own path.

=== Temptation: A Gabriel Knight Interlude ===
To celebrate the release of Gabriel Knight: Sins of the Fathers - 20th Anniversary Edition, Jane Jensen released a short prose story online. The story Temptation: A Gabriel Knight Interlude is set six months following the events of the third game. The story was later adapted into a comic book.

The short story depicts Gabriel pursuing a cloaked figure in the woods said to be a seeleesser, "an eater of souls". During the case, Gabriel reflects on recent events and Grace's departure, as well as the fact that he has fulfilled three major "quests" already and is now 36-years-old, bringing him to wonder if he has reached his peak already. During the adventure, he has a vision of Von Glower from The Beast Within and hears the man voice his own doubts and selfish desires, saying Gabriel should return to his life where he had no responsibility and didn't need to endanger himself hunting evil. In the end, Gabriel dismisses the vision and continues his investigations.

=== Possible fourth game ===
After the release of Blood of the Sacred, Blood of the Damned, Jane Jensen stated she had started planning a possible story and setting for a fourth game. In Blood of the Sacred, Blood of the Damned, the player can use the SIDNEY computer interface to search for "gk4" and see an entry on ghosts as a result. Jane Jensen said ghosts would have been the antagonists for a fourth entry to the series. However, no Gabriel Knight 4 game followed and in August 2006, it was confirmed that Jane Jensen's next adventure game project would be the revival of Gray Matter.

The rights to Gabriel Knight are currently held by Activision, which acquired them after merging with former rights holder Vivendi Universal in 2008. Jane Jensen has pitched new Gabriel Knight games to both Vivendi and Activision. In April 2012, Jensen launched Pinkerton Road Studio and said in interviews that she hopes producing a new game with Pinkerton Road is a step in the right direction for getting the chance to make new Gabriel Knight games in the future. A remake of Gabriel Knight: Sins of the Fathers for Windows, OS X, iOS and Android was released on October 15, 2014.

In 2022, Jensen noted that she has previously envisaged a potential fourth game being about witches and set in Scotland. She stated her willingness to proceed with a book version as a method to make any potential subsequent game production more feasible, but admitted that the complex nature of rights and legal contracts with Activision continues to render such a project unlikely.

In a June, 2024 YouTube interview with Daniel Albu, Jensen said that she had written the first chapter of a new Gabriel Knight story, so that GK4 and GK5 were in the works. She told him that she had attached some art for it and that "the licenses are with Microsoft."

=== Short story "Five Hearts" ===
In November, 2024, Jensen published the downloadable illustrated short story "Five Hearts" on her husband's website. In it, Gabriel Knight travels to Salzburg, Austria, to investigate a mysterious cursed dagger.

== Characters ==
- Gabriel Knight is the central protagonist of the series, the orphaned son of Philip Knight and Margaret Templeton Knight, meant to be about 30 year old when the narrative starts (although his age is not consistent in the games). Gabriel is the proprietor of St. George's Rare Books in his hometown of New Orleans and a struggling horror fiction author. Charismatic, sardonic, and intuitive, he prefers to avoid responsibility, often distracted by interesting books and casual affairs with women. His two main friends are his assistant Grace Nakimura and his childhood friend Franklin Mosely, a police detective. Early in the first game, he realizes there is more to his family than he knows. Gabriel's nightmares and a desire to research a new book lead him to investigate recent "voodoo murders". During his investigation, he discovers he descends from the Ritter family and is the latest in a line of Schattenjägers ("Shadow Hunters"). Visiting his family castle Schloss Ritter in Rittersberg, Germany, he undergoes a spiritual trial to become a new Schattenjäger. He later inherits the Ritter Talisman. GK2 features a somewhat more somber Gabriel now living in his family castle over a year later and experiencing financial success since his new novel The Voodoo Murders (based on his experiences in the first game and starring fictional detective Blake Backlash) is a best-seller. By GK3, Gabriel has published another successful novel entitled The Brutal Beast, based on the events of the second game. Gabriel is a more mature and experienced character, now more focused on his duties as a Schattenjäger, with Grace as a full partner in his investigations. Despite his feelings, he still resists romantic commitment with Grace.
- Grace Nakimura is first introduced in Gabriel Knight: Sins of the Fathers in 1993 as a non-player character, before becoming a player character in both sequel games. Introduced as a 26-year-old assistant, Grace is a researcher, aid, and moral compass for Gabriel in the first game. She becomes a full investigative partner in the two sequel games and is more strongly in the role of romantic interest. At the end of the third game, she decides to pursue her own path rather than remain Gabriel's helper. Grace has been included in multiple lists of top sidekicks and female characters in video games. GameSpot wrote that Grace was "more likable" than Knight and more "intelligent and resourceful". In 2007, Tom's Games also noted that unlike traditional female characters in video games, Grace is designed with conservative dress, without "sexy outfits [and] out-sized proportions". According to USgamer's Pete Davison in 2013, "Grace Nakimura remains one of the best, most realistic female characters in game history".
- Gerde Hull (voiced by Mary Kay Bergman in the first game, and played by Andrea Martin in the second) is the caretaker of Gabriel's ancestral home, Schloss Ritter in Ritterberg, Germany. When Gabriel first meets Gerde in Sins of the Fathers, she is an anxious and enthusiastically optimistic young woman. She clearly has deep love and respect for Gabriel's great-uncle Wolfgang Ritter, grieving the man's death still during the events of The Beast Within. Gerde acts as a valuable research assistant. Grace considers her a possible rival as Gabriel's investigative partner and love interest but after a talk with Gerde the two become friends. Gerde does not appear in the third game but is mentioned.

== Novelizations ==
The stories of Sins of the Fathers and The Beast Within were adapted into novels by Jane Jensen. The first is a straightforward adaptation of the events of the game, an approach which Jane Jensen decided, in retrospect, was not the most successful way of introducing Gabriel Knight to a literary audience. For the second novel she "threw the whole idea of the game away and started again from scratch".

Both books are out of print as of 2010. As part of her 2012 Kickstarter campaign to fund a new adventure game, Jensen offered both Gabriel Knight novels as ebooks to backers who pledge $50 or more.

== Compilation ==
In 1998, Sierra released the title Gabriel Knight Mysteries: Limited Edition, which contains:

- an 8-disc PC CD box of first two Gabriel Knight games and electronic manuals.
- a 419-page novelization of Gabriel Knight: Sins of the Fathers (written by Jane Jensen and published by Roc in 1997).
- a full soundtrack of The Beast Within: A Gabriel Knight Mystery.
- bundled with the original 1993 editions, a 33-page full-color graphic novel of an event that takes place almost 200 years before the opening of Gabriel Knight: Sins of the Fathers (written by Jane Jensen, art direction by Nathan Gams and illustrated by Terese Nielsen).
- a 20-page full-color graphic novel of an event that takes place days before the opening of the then-upcoming Gabriel Knight 3: Blood of the Sacred, Blood of the Damned (written by Jane Jensen and illustrated by Ron Spears).
