= Deadtime Stories (video game) =

2010 hidden object video game

- Developer: I-play
- Publisher: Big Fish Games
- Platform: Windows PC
- Release: 2010
- Genre: Hidden object game
- Mode: Single-player

Deadtime Stories is a 2010 hidden object PC game developed by I-play and distributed by Big Fish Games. The premise of the game centers around a mysterious character known as Edward Blackgate, and the lost souls interred in his private cemetery, "Everlasting Life". The player meets these lost souls and learns about the events that lead to their downfalls, respectively.

== About the game ==
Miss Jessie Bodeen is characterized as a New Orleans Voodoo queen, who acts as a healer for the local African Americans working as servants in the city. As a healer, she has pledged to do no harm. Now a resident at "Everlasting Life", Jessie tells the story of her downfall when she accepts a commission from Delphine LaLaurie, a character based on her real-life counterpart.

For $150, this character was supposed to keep away another socialite, Mrs. Anton, a wealthy young widow, who is new in town and already more popular than Delphine LaLaurie. Jessie had been warned by Mambo Marie, a fellow Voodoo practitioner, to not invoke the Loa to curse Mrs. Anton. So, for the next three months, Jessie is able to discreetly poison Mrs. Anton with small, non-lethal amounts of aconite to keep her too ill to attend any parties.

However, after three months and the end of the social season in New Orleans, Delphine LaLaurie reneged on their deal, despite Jessie Bodeen upholding her part of the bargain. Furious about having been lied to, Jessie Bodeen makes up her mind to seek revenge on Delphine LaLaurie by invoking the Loa, particularly Damballa, to avenge her. The Loa punishes Delphine LaLaurie, regardless of collateral damages and innocent bystanders. Ten years later, the Loa also punished Jessie Bodeen for having taken on Delphine LaLaurie's commission in the first place.
