= Constant Pressure System =

High-power rubber bladder-based water gun technology

The Constant Pressure System, or CPS, is a powerful design used for certain water guns. CPS water guns are powered by a rubber bladder inflated with water. It was patented by Bruce M. D'Andrade as "bladder water gun".

== Design ==
Comparison of simple (A), air pressurised reservoir (B), air separate pressure chamber (C) and Constant Pressure System (D) water guns: In (A), pushing the trigger (1) expels the cylinder's contents through the nozzle; releasing it refills it from the reservoir (2). In (B), pumping the piston (3) forces air into the reservoir (4), increasing its pressure; opening the valve (5) expels the reservoir's contents. In (C), pulling out the piston (6) draws in water from the unpressurised reservoir (7), whereas pushing it in pressurises the firing chamber (8); triggering the valve (9) expels the chamber's contents. In (D), the firing chamber is replaced with an elastic bladder (8a) which exerts more uniform pressure on the water.

All Constant Pressure water guns have a rubber bladder, which is either shaped like a balloon (spherical) or is a length of latex rubber tubing (cylindrical). Water is pumped from the water gun's reservoir and into the rubber bladder, inflating it. Then the trigger is pulled, which opens a valve, allowing the bladder to push the water out of the nozzle. Due to the nature of the bladder, the stream produced is fairly constant, and has almost the same range and power throughout the entire shot, most streams dropping only one foot in range towards the end of a continuous shot, unlike most air pressure based water guns which exhibit a constant loss of pressure while the trigger is pulled.

Some bladder water guns, such as Speedloaders, Water Worms, and Super Chargers, are inflated with water directly from a garden hose using a quick-fill device (QFD). This allows faster filling, but makes them more limited since they require a hose to work.

== History ==
The Constant Pressure System was used for the first time when Larami Toys released the Super Soaker CPS 2000 in 1996. To this day, the first generation CPS 2000 is the most powerful production water gun, with an output of 30 oz. per second (~850 ml/s), and a range of 53 feet (16 m). After the CPS 2000, Larami released several CPS models from 1996 to 2002. These are the CPS 2000 (1996), CPS 1000, CPS 1500, CPS 2500, and CPS 3000 (1998), the CPS 1200, CPS 1700, CPS 2700, and CPS 3200 (2000) the CPS 1–3–5, and CPS Splashzooka (2001), the CPS 2100, and CPS 4100 (2002).

During this time, some other water guns were released that also used CPS technology, under Super Soaker's Super Charger and Monster lines, these are the SC (Super Charger) 500, SC 600, and Power Pak (1999) SC Big trouble, Monster and Monster XL (2000) Monster (2001) (the prior Monster being renamed the Monster X)

In 2002, the Super Soaker brand was taken over by Hasbro, along with the CPS patents. Hasbro mostly released smaller air pressure water guns, although they continued to make a few water guns with CPS technology. These included the Aquapack Devastator, the Flash Flood, the Arctic Blast, the Hydroblitz, and the Hydro Cannon. However, these blasters were not nearly as powerful as the previous ones

Some other companies used rubber bladders in their water guns despite the patent. These include the Speed Loader line from 1999, the Water Worm, and a few Water Warriors blasters. In the case of Water Warriors, Hasbro ended up suing them over the patent.

The "bladder water gun" patent expired in 2016.

In 2020, German outdoor company Spyra GmbH launched its own CPS-based line of electric water guns marketed under the same name.

== Legal issues ==
In 2010, Buzz Bee Toys Inc. was successfully sued by Hasbro Inc. for a patent infringement. Hasbro claimed that Buzz Bee Toys infringed on a patent related to its Nerf Super Soaker water toy. Although it is unknown exactly what the dispute was over, it is strongly suggested that Hasbro was suing for the Water Warriors Hydro Power water guns, which were becoming too similar to Hasbro's Constant Pressure System. Since then, the Water Warriors line has not contained a single Hydro Power water gun.
