= Oozinator =

Toy water gun

The Oozinator is a toy water gun manufactured by Hasbro, Inc It is a member of the Super Soaker family, which includes ten other squirt-gun toys. It gained notoriety after its release due to its ability to discharge a viscous compound that resembled human semen, as well as its suggestive television advertisements that depicted the compound being forcefully ejected onto unwilling children.

== Description ==
The company recommends the Super Soaker Oozinator for use by ages 6 & Up, suggests at retail for US$24.99, and is item # 52695. Product specifications include an "air-powered blaster," 27-ounce water capacity and 20-shot "bio-ooze" capacity. The toy uses an "air-powered blaster" that can propel water up to 35 feet, and "bio-ooze" up to 20 feet. The toy comes with a 10-ounce supply of "bio-ooze."

In Spray Mode 1, the toy is actuated and propels water from a nozzle located superiorly on the anterior aspect by squeezing a trigger, located toward the rear. A pressure reservoir which is charged by a lateral pumping action of a forward-pointing, superiorly located rod enables actuation.

In Spray Mode 2, the toy spurts "ooze" with each pumping action of a separate, lateral manual handle, located at the inferior aspect of the anterior surface, immediately below the water charging handle. In "ooze" mode, the toy does not store pressure.

== History ==
Hasbro copyrighted materials related to the Oozinator in 2005 and the toy was put on sale in 2006.

In Hasbro's description of the device, they advertised that Oozinator operators could surprise their opponents with "globs of gooey bio-ooze" during a water fight:

Sneak up on your opponents with a surprise bio-ooze attack! Just when they think you're coming at 'em with water, blast 'em with a shot of icky bio-ooze! Shoot out globs of gooey bio-ooze and then drench 'em with water! It's a double blast attack that'll keep your opponents on their toes and running during every water fight.

However due to the concerning nature of the design, the product was discontinued not long after release.

== Reception ==
- The AV Club (a Los Angeles-based production company) made a spoof video of a board meeting discussing the Oozinator, where one person sees how the toy could be suggestive, but is ostracized by the others for it.
- The commercial for the Oozinator was featured on the December 18, 2006 episode of The Daily Show. In the segment "This Week in God," the Oozinator was named as "the Number One "Devil's Plaything" for Christmas," and correspondent Samantha Bee noted it offered "Junior's first moneyshot."
- Consumer affairs website Consumerist discussed the water gun in several posts, describing it as having the "shape and hue of a grotesque alien phallus."
- In a blog post highlighting several comics that had been made about the product, Wired (magazine) described the Oozinator as "a super-soaker with shall we say bukkakean properties."
- Engadget described it as a "bizarrely suggestive goo-shooting weapon, which is available at Toys R Us until some exec somewhere gets a clue"
