= Water Warriors =

Toy water gun brand

- Type: Water gun
- Company: Buzz Bee Toys
- Country: United States
- Availability: 2003–Present
- Materials: Plastic + metal and latex parts
- Official website

Water Warriors is a water gun brand owned by Buzz Bee Toys that was created by the company in 2003. The toy line comprises a large variety of pressurized water guns (similar to early Super Soaker blasters), as well as smaller water guns for younger children.

== History ==
In the 1990s, Larami's Super Soaker was the leading brand of water guns. In 2002, Larami was acquired by Hasbro and subsequently terminated a number of Larami engineers. In 2003, the former Hasbro engineers started a company called Buzz Bee Toys and created the Water Warriors brand.

The "Firefly", "Hornet", "Zzapper", "Wasp", "Lightning" and "Blazer" were the first six types of water guns offered by Buzz Bee Toys. The Firefly, Hornet and Zzapper were standard air pressure water guns, the Wasp was a "piston pumper", and the Blazer and Lightning employed "Hydro-Power", a system that the Buzz Bee Toys engineers invented. Hydro-Power is an alternative to the patented Super Soaker Constant Pressure System (CPS).

== Water Gun Designs ==
Water Warriors guns have several designs that work in different ways. These include the following:

=== Squirt guns ===
Buzz Bee Toys has made traditional squirt pistols such as the Kwik Grip and Kwik Grip XL. Some of their squirt pistol designs have improved features. These include the Power Shot and Power Squirt.

=== Piston Pumper ===
Piston water guns have been produced for many years. These guns do not have triggers; they are fired simply by pumping. Although this design feature allows them to reload rapidly, piston pumpers tend to have less range and less power than other designs.

=== Air Pressure (Pressurized Reservoir) ===
Originally made popular by the Super Soaker 50, pressurized reservoir systems are still common for small water guns. A water gun using this system is pressurized by air being pumped and compressed into its reservoir. When the trigger is pulled, a valve is opened and the compressed air pushes the water out of the nozzle.
Water Warriors started with three pressurized reservoir water guns, and has continued to produce them in various shapes and sizes.

=== Air Pressure (Separate Chamber) ===
This is a more powerful air pressure system that was also first introduced by Super Soaker. It is designed so that water is pumped from the reservoir into an empty plastic container. As the water is pumped in, the air sitting inside becomes compressed. When the trigger is pulled, the valve opens and the compressed air forces the water out. Although Water Warriors did not use this design for the first several years of production, they did use a variation they referred to as "air-piston" (below). The brand first used separate air pressure in 2009. After being sued by Hasbro, Buzz Bee started taking advantage of air pressure technology, releasing the Gorgon, Ultimate Explorer, Colossus, and others.

=== Hydro-Power ===
Hydro-Power was Buzz Bee's equivalent of Super Soaker's Constant Pressure System (CPS). Hydro-Power consists of a flat, circular sheet of rubber (known as a diaphragm) clamped with several bolts onto a disk with a hole in it. Water is pumped into the hole, pressing on the rubber sheet and building up pressure.

In 2009, Buzz Bee Toys started manufacturing water guns with CPS type bladders under the same name of Hydro-Power. Because of this, Buzz Bee was sued by Hasbro.

=== Air Piston ===
Air piston was a short-lived variation of air pressure that was made in 2005 under the Aqua Master Pre-Charger lineup. A tube with a piston in it was pressurized with air in the back, pushing the piston to the front. Then the gun was switched to water mode, and water would be pumped in the front, pushing the piston to the back again. This system gave the guns extra pressure, and allowed them to shoot any direction.

=== Spring-Powered ===
Water Warriors has made a variety of spring-powered water guns. The first was the Splat Blaster, which was cocked with a lever action, and fired a small burst of water. Next was the Steady Stream, which was pumped like a piston blaster, but had a spring-loaded pressure chamber behind the nozzle. This gave it a constant stream, and allowed it to continue shooting for a moment after pumping ceased. In 2009, Water Warriors made the Pulse series, a line of pressurized water guns that used spring-loaded pressure chambers.

=== Motorized ===
Water Warriors has produced a few motorized water guns. The first was the Scorpion, which used a motor to automatically pump water into its Hydro-Power pressure chamber. In 2007, they made the Tarantula, which ran entirely off of a motor to fire water. The Tarantula was considered by Popular Mechanics to be "The Best Battery-Powered Gun." They also made the Jet, a smaller and less powerful gun intended for small children.

== User feedback ==
In relation to its test of four water gun types, Popular Mechanics commented that the Water Warriors Gorgon was "too heavy for even the oldest tester, and the pump-fire was hard to shoot on the run." The criticism was isolated and similar comments have not appeared in other internet reviews.

A consumer perspective on the Water Warriors products was ascertained in a survey of water gun enthusiasts from WaterWar.net. All of the enthusiasts who participated in the survey agreed that, although they preferred the appearance of Super Soakers, Water Warriors, at the time of the survey, manufactured the best water guns.

Buzz Bee Toys has previously invited selected enthusiasts to its annual meeting in order to assist with effective decision-making.

== Lawsuit ==
In 2010, Buzz Bee Toys was successfully sued by Hasbro for patent infringement. Hasbro claimed that Buzz Bee Toys infringed on a patent related to its "Super Soaker water toy." Although it is unknown exactly what the dispute was over, it is strongly suggested that Hasbro was suing for the Water Warriors Hydro-Power water guns, which were becoming too similar to Super Soaker's Constant Pressure System. As a result, the Water Warriors line did not contain a single Hydro-Power water gun again until the CPS patent expired.

== See also ==
- Super Soaker - The competing brand from Hasbro.
- Entertech - A defunct line of water guns from the 1980s by LJN Toys.
