= Entertech =

American toy brand

- Type: Water gun
- Company: LJN
- Country: United States
- Availability: 1985–1990
- Slogan: "The look! The feel! The sound, so real!"

A promotional magazine scan showing off guns from the first generation.

Entertech was a brand of battery-powered motorized water guns sold in the United States from 1985 to 1990 by the now-defunct LJN. Unlike the colorful designs of many of the simple hand powered pump water guns of that time, most of the Entertech water guns were manufactured from black plastics with a matte finish to resemble real firearms.

The Entertech line boasts realistic looks and water storage mostly in the form of detachable magazines like their real firearm counterparts. The motorized water pumps make noises that, though not realistic, add an extra level of sensation. All of the guns except the Enforcer shotgun model have a fully automatic rate of fire (approximately 60 rpm) and a 30-foot effective range.

== Models ==
=== First generation ===
- Side Kick Pistol (product design based on the Colt M1911 pistol, it was connected via a vinyl tube enclosing a water feed tube and trigger actuation wires to a separate pack fashioned to look like an ammunition box that was slung over the user's shoulder which held a 1-quart water supply)
- M-16 (product design based on the Colt M655 Carbine)
- R.P.G. Rocket Water Launcher (product design loosely based on the rocket propelled grenade launcher RPG-7)
- AK Centerfire (a submachine gun with a number of design features from the Intratec TEC-22)
- Double Clip Baretta (a submachine gun design loosely based on the FMK-3. It was also supplied with two magazines.)
- Water Laser (a futuristic looking laser gun with the same power and water delivery mechanism as the Side Kick Pistol, except with a 2-quart capacity and designed to be worn as a backpack)
- Water Hawk (a large machine pistol based on the Interdynamic AB KG-9)
- Uzi Cap Repeater (This was the only item that was not a water gun. It was a cap gun designed to look like a Micro Uzi.)

=== Second generation ===
- Water Grenade Set (a portable water balloon filling device. The unit was designed to resemble a detonator device. It included 20 green water balloons designed to resemble pineapple-style Mk 2 hand grenades.)
- Defender Shotgun (a pump-action shotgun with a detachable magazine for the water supply and powered by an air pressure discharge system similar to Larami Corporation's Super Soaker guns)
- M-60 Rambo Edition (a re-branded M-16 with a box mag, folding bi-pod, a Rambo logo sticker on the gun, and a red Rambo headband. This product was released to promote Rambo: First Blood Part II.)
- R.P.G. Rocket Water Launcher Rambo Edition (same as above)
- Water Hawk Rambo Edition
- Baretta (a copy of the Beretta 92 pistol, released in stainless steel or all black versions)
- The Saturator (a pump-action shotgun modeled after the Pancor Jackhammer)

=== Similar products ===
- Photon: The Ultimate Game on Planet Earth: A home version of the Photon laser tag arenas
- Gotcha! The Sport!: Non-motorized guns which fired ink-covered soft plastic pellets, a combination of paintball and airsoft. The toys were released in conjunction with the video game Gotcha! The Sport!, also by LJN.

== Company closure ==
The end of Entertech's short-lived success was due in part to incidents in which law enforcement officers shot and killed children toting toy guns, claiming to have mistaken them for actual firearms. Toy guns were used in robberies of retail establishments and banks. Amid these highly publicized incidents, Entertech voluntarily began manufacturing guns with blaze orange-colored caps in 1987, and began a line of less-realistic neon-colored guns later that year.

After Acclaim Entertainment purchased LJN in April 1990, it began phasing out toy manufacturing. Using LJN as a second brand to make video games instead of toys increased the quota of games Acclaim could produce for the Nintendo Entertainment System. In September 1990, Acclaim sold the Entertech brand for $1.7 million.

== See also ==
- Super Soaker, a line of water guns sold by Hasbro under the Nerf banner.
- Water Warriors, a line of water guns by Buzz Bee Toys
- Lazer Tag, a contemporary line of electronic toy guns also involving accidental shootings by police
