= Gotcha! (film) =

1985 film by Jeff Kanew

- Theatrical release poster
- Directed by: Jeff Kanew
- Screenplay by: Dan Gordon
- Story by: Paul G. Hensler; Dan Gordon
- Produced by: Paul G. Hensler
- Starring: Anthony Edwards; Linda Fiorentino
- Cinematography: King Baggot
- Edited by: Michael A. Stevenson
- Music by: Bill Conti
- Production company: Michael I. Levy Enterprises
- Distributed by: Universal Pictures
- Release date: May 3, 1985
- Running time: 101 minutes
- Country: United States
- Language: English
- Budget: $12.5 million
- Box office: $10.8 million

Gotcha! is a 1985 American spy action comedy film, starring Anthony Edwards and Linda Fiorentino and directed by Jeff Kanew, who also directed Edwards in Revenge of the Nerds (1984).

Lead character Jonathan Moore (Edwards) is a shy UCLA veterinary student and the reigning champion at "Gotcha", a campus-wide paintball game. While on vacation in Paris, he is seduced by an older woman, the sexy and mysterious Sasha (Fiorentino), and soon becomes embroiled in an international espionage operation.

== Plot ==
Jonathan Moore, an 18-year-old veterinary student at UCLA, is an expert at "Gotcha", a popular Assassin-like game where students chase each other on campus using paintball guns. Jonathan and his roommate Manolo travel to Paris during spring break. While alone in a café, Jonathan meets Sasha Banicek, a 24-year-old Czechoslovak woman, and later loses his virginity to her.

Instead of going to Spain with Manolo, Jonathan accompanies Sasha to West Berlin to spend more time with her. In their hotel room, Sasha tells Jonathan that she has to go to East Berlin to pick up a package, as she works as a courier. One night, after arriving in East Berlin, Sasha sneaks out of their hotel room while Jonathan is asleep and meets with a German man, who tells her the location of the pickup of her package. Unknowingly, Sasha is monitored by Vlad, a Soviet agent.

The next day, Sasha tells Jonathan that if she ever instructs him to meet her at the Café Friedrichstrasse, it means that he must immediately leave East Berlin, and hands him a package with a strudel. Noticing that Vlad is following them, Sasha tells Jonathan to meet her at a butcher shop near their hotel in one hour. Vlad chases her, but she escapes. She is ordered by the German man to use Jonathan to get the package over to West Berlin. Sasha meets Jonathan at a subway station, slipping an object into his backpack and saying that she will meet him back at the hotel. However, she later calls him and tells him to meet her at the Café Friedrichstrasse.

That night, while Jonathan rushes to Checkpoint Charlie to cross into West Berlin, Sasha is caught by Vlad and the East German secret police; she is strip-searched by the Soviets, but nothing is found on her. Vlad arrives at the border crossing to search for Jonathan, who has crossed the border safely before he could be captured. Once in West Berlin, Jonathan finds that his hotel room has been ransacked and his traveler's checks have been stolen. Vlad and his henchmen eventually find Jonathan at the Spandau Citadel, the location Sasha gave him, where he meets a woman who asks for the object Sasha gave him. She is confused when he gives her the strudel, before Vlad shoots her. The agents chase Jonathan through the Citadel. Jumping into a water canal, Jonathan escapes and stumbles upon a German punk rock band headed for Hamburg, who offer him a ride to the airport.

Soon after Jonathan safely makes it back to Los Angeles, a band of Soviet agents led by Vlad also arrives. Jonathan finds the object planted by Sasha, a film canister, in his backpack. He visits his parents and tells them what happened in Germany, but they do not believe him and instead accuse him of being a drug addict. Jonathan calls the CIA for help, telling them about Sasha and the film. Temporarily arrested for ramming a car, Jonathan returns the next morning to find his apartment broken into and looted.

The CIA tells Jonathan to bring them the film canister. At the CIA's Los Angeles headquarters, Jonathan is surprised to find Sasha working there. Jonathan arranges a meeting with Sasha at UCLA and uses Manolo's help to separate her from the CIA agents. Sasha admits that she is actually Cheryl Brewster, a CIA agent from Pittsburgh, before Vlad and his henchmen appear and chase the pair through the campus. During their flight, Jonathan seizes a tranquilizer gun from the veterinary sciences building and uses it to incapacitate their pursuers. The Soviets are arrested and the CIA agents thank Jonathan for his help in obtaining the film. Cheryl/Sasha tells him she wants to continue their relationship, and they kiss.

After they part, Jonathan talks to an attractive student who previously rebuffed him, and she coldly turns him down. As she walks away, he aims the tranquilizer gun and shoots her in the rear.

== Cast ==
- Anthony Edwards as Jonathan Moore
- Linda Fiorentino as Sasha Banicek / Cheryl Brewster, a CIA agent
- Nick Corri as Manolo, Jonathan's roommate and friend
- Alex Rocco as Al Moore, Jonathan's father
- Marla Adams as Maria Moore, Jonathan's mother
- Klaus Löwitsch as Vlad
- Christopher Rydell as Bob Jensen
- Christie Claridge as girl student
- Brad Cowgill as Reilly
- Kari Lizer as Muffy
- David Wohl as professor
- Irene Olga López as Rosario
- Dragomir Stanojević as KGB goon

== Production ==
Gotcha! was filmed in October 1984, with principal photography in Los Angeles (in and around the UCLA campus), Paris, and West Berlin.

== Soundtrack ==
The original soundtrack album was released on LP in 1985 on the MCA Records label. Its theme song is "Gotcha!" by British singer Thereza Bazar, which was recorded for the film. It includes songs by Giuffria and Nik Kershaw. Songs in the film but not included on the MCA soundtrack album include "Two Tribes" and "Relax" by Frankie Goes to Hollywood.

In 2020, Intrada Records released a limited edition album of Bill Conti's 28-minute-long score, two tracks of which were on the 1985 soundtrack album. One cue was re-arranged for the 1985 soundtrack album. None of the pop songs could be licensed for this release.

== Reception ==
Vincent Canby of The New York Times described the film as "a small but elaborately overproduced comedy-melodrama." He went on to deride the lack of flair in the film, calling it "as devoid of personality as it's possible for a narrative movie to be." In a similar vein, Leonard Maltin commented that Gotcha! was "very nearly a good movie, with some sharp dialogue to start but loses its appeal as it loses credibility." Giving the film two stars out of four, Roger Ebert of the Chicago Sun-Times described the European sequences as "a well-directed cat-and-mouse game" that lost its way in the final act after returning to the United States, with the film's main flaw being a focus on Edwards' character when Fiorentino was far more intriguing: "I'll bet the men who made this movie just assumed it had to be told from his point of view, and never considered hers. Too bad. I think they missed their best chance."

On the review aggregator website Rotten Tomatoes, the film holds an approval rating of 31% based on 13 reviews, with an average rating of 5/10.

== Legacy ==
In November 1987, LJN published a video game adaptation for the Nintendo Entertainment System titled Gotcha! The Sport!. It was developed by Atlus for the Zapper light gun and adapts the capture-the-flag paintball tournament from the film's opening sequence, completely omitting the spy-comedy plot. LJN marketed the game as a cross-promotional tie-in for its Entertech line of battery-operated water and paintball guns. This line included physical Gotcha! branded toys, such as the Enforcer double pistol set and the Commando rifle, which were sold with protective glasses and targets.

== See also ==
- List of American films of 1985
- Assassin (game)
- Tag: The Assassination Game
