= Senior assassin =

Water gun assassin game

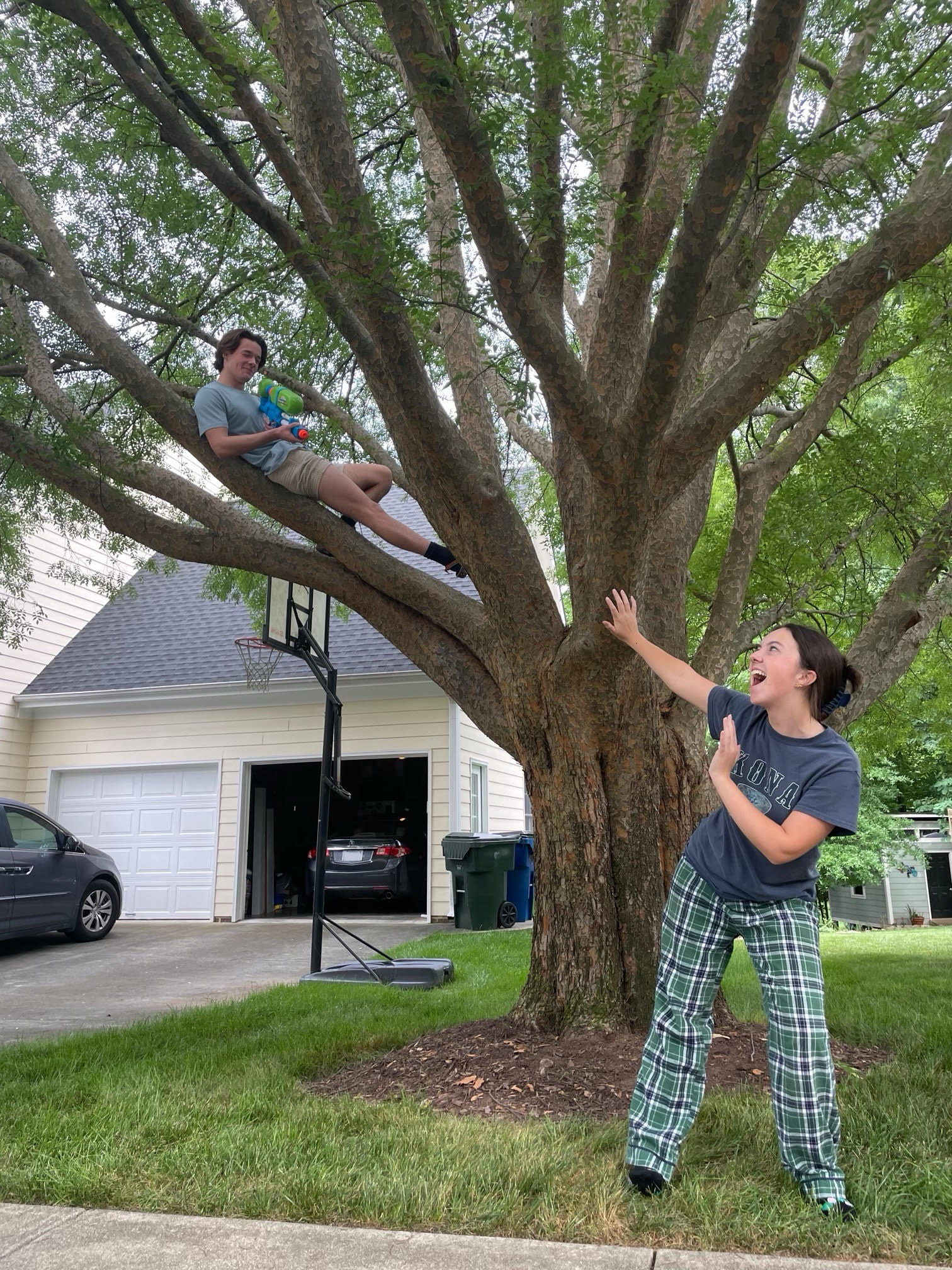
- A staged photo of an elimination in the game
- Other names: Senior Water Wars; Senior Splashin' (Sioux Falls); Paranoia (Chicago); Senior Tag (Columbus)
- Years active: 2010s–present
- Genres: Assassin game
- Players: 2 or more
- Age range: 12th grade (senior year students)
- Skills: Accurizing, hiding, observation, running, sleuthing
- Materials required: Water gun

Senior assassin (sometimes known by other names locally) is a form of the assassin game often played in the United States and Canada between students in 12th grade during their senior year before graduation. The objective of the game is for participating students to "assassinate" or eliminate their target, a fellow participating student, by squirting them with a water gun within a given time period. While rules often vary by school, most games are played bracket-style, with the winner of the game receiving a jackpot prize of all eliminated players' entry fees. Games are not sanctioned by the school, and are not allowed to take place on private property or school grounds during school hours. Despite these precautions, the game has been condemned by some authorities for concerns about player safety and the potential for dangerous reactions from those unfamiliar with the game.

== Rules ==
The game, also known as "Senior Water Wars", "Senior Splashin'" in Sioux Falls, "Paranoia" in some suburbs in Chicago, and "Senior Tag" in Columbus, became popular across the United States in the 2010s, likely due to its portrayal on television shows such as iCarly and Gossip Girl, as well as on social media. It is most commonly played between high school seniors in twelfth grade. Games are started near graduation in the months of either April or May, in which participating students who pay an admission fee are assigned another participating student as a target, who they must "assassinate" or eliminate from the game by squirting them with a water gun, all while being hunted themselves. Targets must be assassinated within a given time period, or the hunting student is eliminated. Oftentimes, video evidence or a secondary witness of the assassination is required for it to be counted. Such videos are often posted on major social media platforms including Instagram, TikTok, and YouTube to promote the game and for entertaining content. When a winner is decided, the admission fees are awarded as a jackpot. Games are not sanctioned by the school or police, and are not allowed to take place on private property or school grounds, especially during school hours.

The rules of the game often vary slightly by school, but the main objectives outlined above remain the same. Researching on social media and asking friends for information about a target is a key element to the game, and likewise giving disinformation to throw hunters off track. To assassinate a target, students are made to employ multiple ambush tactics, which can include: waiting for a target to leave for work or go to their car, hiding in bushes outside of a target's house, and/or making deals with siblings or friends to be let into a target's house. To avoid this, a commonly used tactic is to have non-participating siblings scan the areas of a possible ambush prior to a participating a student's arrival. The game cannot be played on the school's campus during school hours or on private property without the owner's permission. Places often but not always considered out of bounds for assassinating a target include: the school's campus outside of school hours, other schools' campuses, funeral sites (and places of worship, in general), in the target's workplace, in the target's car (especially while in motion), and in the target's house, unless they are let in. The game has been criticized for more extreme and often more dangerous ambush tactics, including: chasing after targets by car, boxing in a target's car with their own, trespassing through private property, and placing GPS trackers on targets' items.

=== Variations ===
Some schools play a version of the game where instead of individual students competing for the jackpot, groups of two students, or two or more teams of many students, are formed, with the winning team splitting the prize money among themselves in the event they win. Some schools also play a version where half of the jackpot goes to the winner(s), and the other half goes towards a charitable organization. Other versions of the game allow for "power-ups" which can protect the target from being eliminated while using them; a common example being wearing goggles or inflatable armbands, but may also include cowboy hats, tutus, and other embarrassing accessories. In relation to power-ups, these versions of the game also often use a "bounty board" or "hit list", which as opposed to being eliminated, a student is placed on in the event they could not assassinate their target within the given time frame. Students on this list either become the target in "purges": a weekly event in which power-ups become useless for those on the board, and everyone still in the game gains the ability to assassinate them, or immediately become everyone's target all week. To get off of the bounty board and likewise avoid the purge, a fee can be paid, which gets added to the final jackpot. While these versions of the game are popular, some students have argued the excess of rules makes the game harder to play and get into, while others have stated it leaves more room for the exploitation of loopholes which make the game more entertaining.

Less commonly, some schools allow the use of water balloons and water bottles in addition to water guns, or Nerf guns and gel blasters as opposed to water guns. Others utilize game-specific apps, like Splashin, which help organize in-game events like purges, as well as broadcast participating players' locations to others playing as an additional challenge.

== Reception and controversies ==
"It's just seniors trying to have fun as their year closes out. It's not meant to be harmful in any way. It's meant to be a fun game."

— Sachin Patel, student of and organizer of the game at Reading Memorial High School, in a May 2023 statement about the game

"Though this may seem harmless on the surface, while in possession of an item resembling a firearm [...] the opportunity for mistaken identity and possible tragic outcomes is very real."

— Mark Garrett, superintendent of Henderson County Public Schools, in a May 2024 statement about the game

While widely regarded by students as a fun game to play before graduation as a way to reduce stress before exams, some authorities have condemned it, as it has attracted a decent amount of controversy since its inception, often revolving around student safety and those unfamiliar with the game. Students trying to stealthily eliminate their target, especially at night, have been confused with burglars with real guns, sometimes resulting in police involvement. In 2017, three students in Hopkinton, Massachusetts, were almost charged with felonies after attempting to ambush a target in what they thought was the target's garage, but instead belonged to an elderly neighbor unfamiliar with the game, who locked them in and called the police. In 2023, a school in Lower Merion Township, Pennsylvania was evacuated after it was reported a student brought a firearm to a sporting event there, which turned out to be a water gun. In 2024, two students in suburban Chicago had a real gun pulled on them by a man with a concealed carry firearm, who had confused the situation with a robbery. The students, attempting to eliminate their target in a local restaurant, were using water guns that looked nearly identical to real weapons. In the same year, two students in Minnesota were killed, and two students in Illinois were injured after attempting to play the game while operating a moving vehicle and crashing. In 2025, a student in Florida was shot by a police officer while pursuing their target at night, later requiring surgery for a broken arm. The same year, a student in Texas died of injuries after he fell off the back of a moving jeep while playing the game.

Other controversies revolve around the game's name using the word "assassin", which has been condemned by some as sounding "tone deaf" in wake of recent school shootings in the United States. The "Senior Tag" variation of the game in Columbus was criticized by local authorities for using nudity as a power-up to protect targets from elimination, leading to a rule change which allowed players to wear underwear while keeping the power-up effective. Police have stated using brightly colored water guns which cannot be mistaken for a real gun can help minimize the risk of being mistakenly reported. Never aiming a water gun at people uninvolved in the game, displaying water guns in a threatening manner, and practicing common sense were likewise recommended by the police to minimize risk associated with the game.
