= Lonnie Johnson (inventor) =

American inventor and engineer (born 1949)

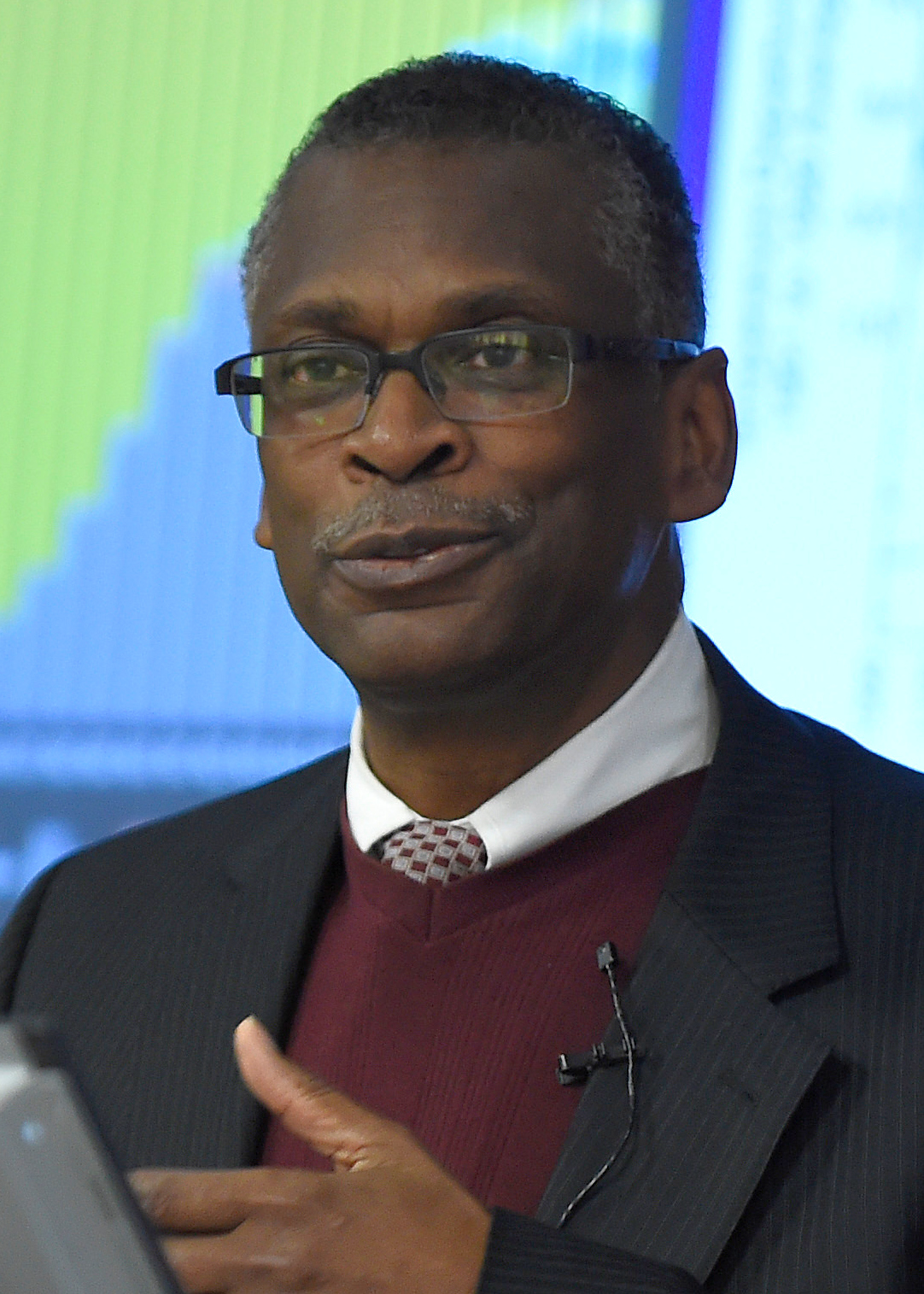
- Johnson in 2016
- Born: Lonnie George Johnson; October 6, 1949 (age 77); Mobile, Alabama, U.S.
- Education: Tuskegee University (BS, MS)
- Occupations: Inventor, engineer, entrepreneur
- Years active: 1978–2013
- Known for: Super Soaker, Nerf Blaster
- Spouse: Linda Moore
- Children: 4

Lonnie George Johnson (born October 6, 1949) is an American inventor, aerospace engineer, and entrepreneur, best known for inventing the bestselling Super Soaker water gun in 1989. He previously served in the U.S. Air Force and worked at NASA's Jet Propulsion Laboratory.

== Early life ==
Johnson was born in Mobile, Alabama, on October 6, 1949. His mother worked as a nurse's aide and his father, who did not finish high school, was a World War II veteran. He has five siblings. His father explained the basic principles of electricity to Johnson at an early age, inspiring his love of inventing. Stating that he "always liked to tinker with things," Johnson earned the nickname "the Professor" from neighborhood children, who often assisted him with his creations. He once tore up his sister's baby doll to see what made her eyes close. On another occasion, Johnson and his friends built a go-kart powered by a lawnmower motor that he had reconstructed from junkyard scraps. He also attempted to cook up rocket fuel in a saucepan on the kitchen stove, causing an explosion that nearly burned down his family's home.

== Education ==
As a teenager, Johnson attended Williamson High School, an all-Black school in Mobile. He drew much of his early inspiration from the life and work of George Washington Carver. In 1968, Johnson had represented his high school at a regional science fair at the University of Alabama, where he was the only Black student in attendance during an era when African Americans had very little representation in STEM fields. He presented a compressed-air-powered robot named "Linex," winning first prize.

After graduating from high school in 1969, Johnson attended Tuskegee University on a scholarship, obtaining a B.S. in mechanical engineering in 1973 and a master's degree in nuclear engineering in 1975. He was later awarded an honorary doctorate from Tuskegee University in 2018.

== Career ==
After completing his master's degree in 1975, Johnson joined the U.S. Air Force, where he worked on the stealth bomber program at the Strategic Air Command.

In 1979, he left the military to join NASA's Jet Propulsion Laboratory (JPL). During his tenure at NASA (1979–1991), Johnson worked on a variety of space exploration projects, including developing the nuclear power source for the Galileo mission to Jupiter, serving as an engineer on the Mariner Mark II spacecraft series for the Comet Rendezvous and Asteroid Flyby and Saturn Orbiter Probe missions, and designing several weapons-related defense systems.

In 1991, Johnson founded his own company, Johnson Research and Development Co., Inc., of which he serves as president. He subsequently collaborated with scientists from Tulane University and Tuskegee University to develop advanced methods of transforming heat directly into electricity to make green energy more affordable.

As of 2022, Johnson operates three technology-development companies in the Sweet Auburn neighborhood of Atlanta, Georgia: Excellatron Solid State, LLC; Johnson Energy Storage; and Johnson Electro-Mechanical Systems (JEMS). JEMS developed the Johnson Thermo-Electrochemical Converter System (JTEC), which Popular Mechanics recognized as one of the top 10 inventions of 2009. Johnson Energy Storage focuses on solid-state battery technology and began developing a demonstration manufacturing line in early 2023.

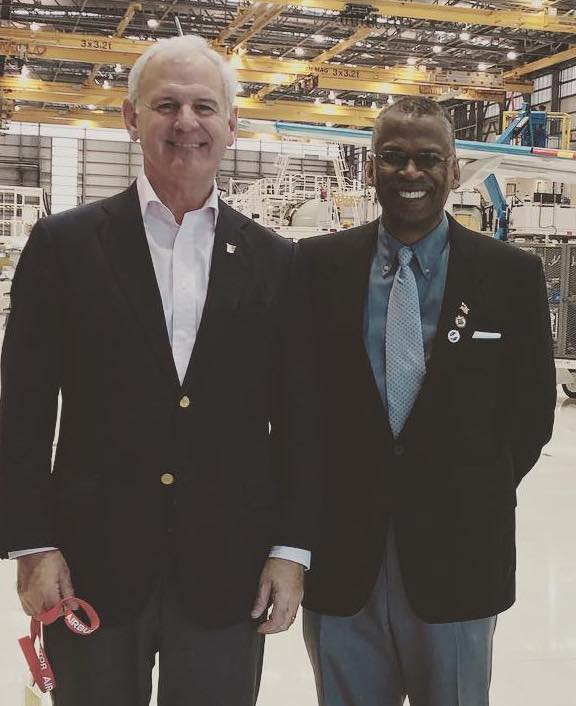
Lonnie Johnson with U.S. Representative Bradley Byrne in 2018.

Johnson is part of a notable group of African American inventors whose combined work accounts for approximately 6 percent of all U.S. patent applications.

== Super Soaker ==
Johnson first conceived the idea for the Super Soaker while working on a heat pump system during his tenure with the Air Force. Initially released in toy stores in 1990 under the name "Power Drencher," the water gun received its trademark name following design adjustments and a remarketing campaign. Retailing between $10 and $60 depending on the model, the Super Soaker became a massive commercial success, generating $200 million in sales in 1991 alone. Shortly after securing the distribution deal with Larami Corporation, the manufacturer was acquired by Hasbro Inc. in February 1995.

Johnson later adapted the water gun's pneumatic pressure technology to replace water with foam projectiles, creating the foundation for the highly successful N-Strike Nerf product line.

In February 2013, Johnson filed a lawsuit against Hasbro after discovering he had been underpaid royalties for the Super Soaker and several Nerf toy lines. In November 2013, an arbitration professional awarded Johnson nearly $73 million in unpaid royalties. By that time, cumulative sales of the Super Soaker approached $1 billion.

== Accomplishments ==
Johnson holds over 250 patents, the majority of which are related to fluid dynamics and toy propulsion systems like the Super Soaker. During his military and civil service, he was awarded the Air Force Achievement Medal and the Air Force Commendation Medal, as well as several NASA awards for his contributions to spacecraft system design at the Jet Propulsion Laboratory.

In 2008, he received the Breakthrough Award from Popular Mechanics for his work on the JTEC system. He was inducted into the State of Alabama Engineering Hall of Fame in 2011. In 2015, the Super Soaker was inducted into the National Toy Hall of Fame, and in 2022, Johnson was inducted into the National Inventors Hall of Fame.

== Personal life ==
Johnson is married to Linda Moore. They have four children and reside in the Ansley Park neighborhood of Atlanta, Georgia.
