= Buzz Bee =

Buzz Bee can refer to either of the following:

- Buzz (mascot), mascot for the Georgia Tech Yellow Jackets, but occasionally referred to as "Buzz Bee"
- Buzz Bee Toys, an American/Hong Kong toy company
- BuzzBee, the mascot for Honey Nut Cheerios cereal

== See also ==
- Buzzy Bee, a children's ride in New Zealand
