= Twister (game) =

Game of physical skill

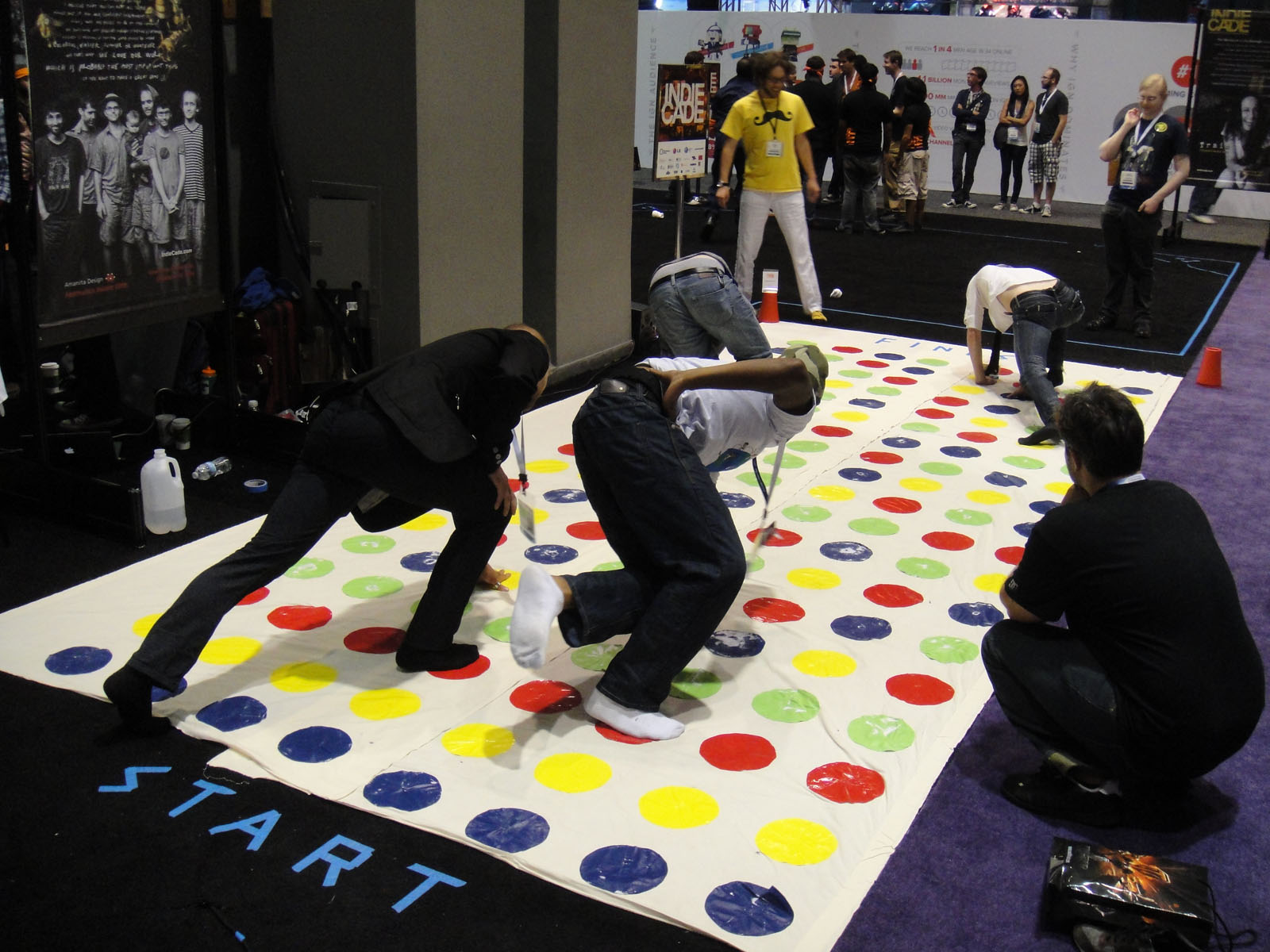
- A group of people playing Twister
- Publishers: Hasbro; Winning Moves Games USA; Nintendo
- Publication: 1966; 60 years ago
- Genres: Physical skill game
- Age range: 6+

Twister is a game of physical skill produced by Milton Bradley Company and Winning Moves Games USA. It is played on a large plastic mat that is spread on the floor or ground. The mat has four rows of six large colored circles on it with a different color in each row: red, yellow, green and blue. A spinner tells players where they have to place their hand or foot. The game promotes itself as "the game that ties you up in knots".

== History ==
A Twister competition in 1966

In 1964, Reyn Guyer Sr. owned and managed a design company called Reynolds Guyer Inc. Agency of Design, which made in-store displays for Fortune 500 companies. His son Reyn Guyer worked there too, and while devising a shoe polish box top promotion for a client, Johnson Wax, created a mat game called King's Footsie, in which players took off their shoes to play. The game was designed to be played on a large floor mat, on which Reyn had drawn colored squares to look like a giant, multiplayer chess game. Players were assigned colors and all played at the same time, trying to cross the board by stepping only on their matching colored squares. The close proximity of the players, all leaning on one another, created tension and laughter.

Reyn and his father thought this game, where the players act as the game pieces and move on a large mat on the floor, could be a hit. They took it to another client, 3M, which had a line of successful bookshelf games at the time. Although 3M passed on the game, the Guyers decided to underwrite the development of a line of games based on King’s Footsie and hired two men to help, a designer named Charles Foley and an artist named Neil Rabens. The game was developed through a collaboration involving Reyn Guyer, who led the project and developed the game concept, along with Charles Foley and Neil Rabens. Contemporary accounts and licensing materials from the period identify Guyer as originating the concept, with Foley and Rabens contributing to its development.

Charles Foley was working for a silk screen printing company when he called on the Reynolds Guyer Inc. Agency of Design and saw the King’s Footsie game mat in the office. He was also a respected and successful toy designer who had worked for Lakeside Industries in Minneapolis. Foley interviewed with the Guyers, who were interested in developing the King’s Footsie game further. Reynolds Guyer Sr. hired Foley, who negotiated a royalty agreement for all games and toy items he designed. Guyer Company agreed, and officially hired Foley. Neil Rabens was a friend of Foley's who had experience working for a toy pool company called Doughboy Industries, and was an accomplished product design artist with an art degree from the Minneapolis School of Art and Design.

The team developed 8 mat games. The one most resembling King's Footsie was dubbed "Pretzel" by Rabens, who changed the squares on the mat to dots and also came up with the addition of having players place their hands on the dots and well as their feet. Foley suggested having the colored dots line up in rows, so that the players became more entwined and added a spinner for one player to use in the role of a caller, who instructed the players which hand or which foot to place on which colored dot. Any player whose, elbow, knee or butt touched the mat during game play was eliminated from the game, until one player remained victorious. On February 1, 1966, Reynolds Guyer Inc, signed a licensing agreement with the Milton Bradley Company to bring Pretzel to the masses.

Charles Foley and Neil Rabens submitted, on 14 April 1966, and were granted on 8 July 1969, US Pat# 3,454,279, Foley, with his extensive experience in the toy industry, called on his good friend, Mel Taft, Senior V.P. for Milton Bradley in 1966, for a product idea presentation. Milton Bradley embraced the idea for the Pretzel game but when Mel Taft found that Transogram had the trademark to a toy dog named Pretzel, the team at Milton Bradley renamed the game "Twister".

Twister became a major success when actress Eva Gabor played it with Johnny Carson on television's The Tonight Show on May 3, 1966. However, in its success, it was also controversial. The company that produced it, Milton Bradley, was accused by its competitors of selling "sex in a box". That accusation is speculated to be because it was the first popular American game to use human bodies as playing pieces.

In 1966, Twister was licensed to Nintendo—then a toy and board game company—for the Japanese market, where it was released as Twister Game.

In 1984, Hasbro acquired the Milton Bradley Company, becoming Twister's parent company. The Reyn Guyer Creative Group continues to work closely with Hasbro to develop and market new additions to the line of Twister products.

Co-inventor Charles Foley died on July 1, 2013, at the age of 82.

Co-inventor Neil Rabens died on May 18, 2020, at the age of 90.

In 2023, Hasbro introduced Twister Air, an app-driven version of the game that uses motion-tracking wearables and augmented reality to track players' movements. The new version replaces the traditional mat with digital game play displayed through a connected device, like a cell phone.

== Gameplay ==
A spinner is attached to a square board and is used to determine where the player has to put their hand or foot. The spinner is divided into four labeled sections: left foot, right foot, left hand, and right hand. Each of those four sections are divided into the four colors (red, yellow, green, and blue). After spinning, the combination is called (for example: "right hand yellow") and players must move their matching hand or foot to a circle of the correct color.

In a two-player game, no two people can have a hand or foot on the same circle; the rules are different for more players. Owing to the scarcity of colored circles, players will often be required to put themselves in unlikely or precarious positions, eventually causing someone to fall. A person is eliminated when they fall or when their elbow or knee touches the mat.

=== Phenomenon ===
Pop singer Britney Spears promoting an exclusive version of the game in 2012

Twister, much like the hula hoop, was one of the many toy fad phenomena that came about in the second half of the 20th century. Microsoft Encarta labeled Twister as being an "industry phenomenon" that "captures the public's imagination, and sells in the millions". Being one of the earliest toy fads and a "national craze for a short time", Twister was able to bring all age groups together, whether children or adults.

== Accessibility ==
There are publicly available instructions on how to alter a Twister game to make it accessible to color-blind individuals and to completely blind individuals.

Blindfolded Twister is an accessible variant where there are four different tactile symbols on the mat, and the players are blindfolded and have to find a circle with the named symbol by feeling.

== Reception ==
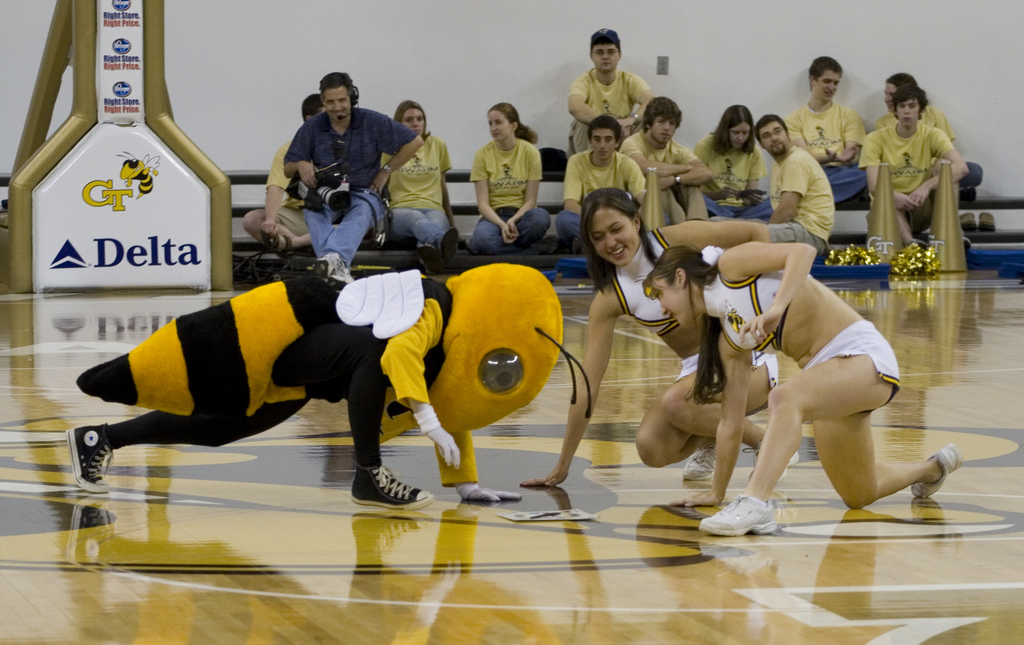
Buzz and Georgia Tech Yellow Jacket cheerleaders playing Twister using the floor of Alexander Memorial Coliseum

In 1967, a year after its release, 3 million Twister games were sold.

Games magazine included Twister in their "Top 100 Games of 1980", praising it as being "nearly as well known as Spin the Bottle, and ten times more enjoyable" while noting that it is "Best played on a soft surface with people you'd like to know better."

Games magazine included Twister in their "Top 100 Games of 1981", noting that "To become a grandmaster at Twister, the first requirement is agility" and that "Like any good party game, Twister can be fun or it can be humiliating."

Games magazine included Twister in their "Top 100 Games of 1982", noting that players can "Become a human pretzel in this popular party game for people who don't mind getting better acquainted" but cautioned to "watch the person with the spinner—the temptation to cheat and call the most difficult move is usually irresistible".
