= Reyn Guyer =

American inventor (born 1935)

- Born: Reynolds Windsor Guyer; 1935 (age 90–91); St. Paul, Minnesota, U.S.
- Education: Dartmouth College
- Occupation: Inventor
- Known for: Developing toys and games a for example, nerf, song writing and publishing, entrepreneurship

Reynolds Winsor "Reyn" Guyer (born in St. Paul, Minnesota in 1935) is an American inventor.

== Inventions ==
Among his notable developments are Twister in 1967 and the NERF ball in 1969, which he developed for Milton Bradley and Parker Brothers, respectively. He was inducted into the Hasbro toy and game Inventors' Hall of Fame in 1986.

Besides his work as a toy inventor, Guyer has also founded a music publishing company called Wrensong/Reynsong Music of Nashville in 1985.

== Philanthropy ==
Having struggled with dyslexia himself, Reyn cofounded Winsor Learning in 1991 to help children who also struggle to read. The Sonday System and Let's Play Learn are effective remediation methods for students who are behind in their reading skills. These programs are used in hundreds of school systems across the country.

== Current Projects ==
- My Friend Wren is Reyn's current project. My Friend Wren is a thoughtfully crafted collection of creative and gentle children's stories and songs designed to provide insightful, educational material and adventure to both kids and parents alike. Reyn narrates and sings every story and song himself.
- The Curly Lasagna project, a series of stories and songs for kids and parents that he created with Jeff Harrington
- A dice game Rally Roll, which he invented in 2014
- Creating sculptures and artwork, many of which are in private collections
- A new lawn game called King's Court
