= Charles Foley (inventor) =

American inventor

Charles Foley (September 6, 1930 – July 1, 2013) was the co-inventor of the game Twister, with Neil W. Rabens.

== Twister ==
Foley received only 2.5% royalties for three years from Milton Bradley, which amounted to about $27,000. The game became a sensation after Johnny Carson and Eva Gabor played it on The Tonight Show in 1966. Hasbro took over the manufacturing of the game.

== Personal ==
Foley was born in Lafayette, Indiana and before he was 10 years old made his first invention, a locking system for the cattle pen at his grandfather's farm. He attended school through the eighth grade and as a young man he worked as a salesman. He served in the Michigan Air National Guard and worked on the assembly line at the Ford Motor Company before taking a job at Lakeside Toys in Minneapolis. He moved his family to Minnesota in 1962. He invented dozens of other toys and games, and had 97 patented inventions.

In 1995, Charles Foley's son, Mark Foley, and Douglas Farley founded Doumar Products Inc. and its heptane-based Un-Du adhesive remover.

== Last years ==
Foley had lived in North Carolina for years, but his son said he returned to Minnesota in 2005 when he began to have health problems and to be closer to his family. Foley's wife, Kathleen, died of breast cancer in 1975.

== Death ==
Foley died July 1, 2013, aged 82, at the Golden Living Center in St. Louis Park, Minnesota. He had been suffering from Alzheimer's disease. He was survived, immediately, by six sons and three daughters, and two brothers and two sisters.
