= Gotcha! The Sport! =

1987 video game

- North American cover art
- Developer: Atlus
- Publisher: LJN
- Composer: Hirohiko Takayama
- Platform: Nintendo Entertainment System
- Release: NA: November 1987
- Genre: Light gun shooter
- Mode: Single-player

Gotcha! The Sport! is a 1987 light gun shooter video game developed by Atlus and published by LJN for the Nintendo Entertainment System (NES). It is a licensed adaptation of the 1985 film Gotcha!, adapting the paintball tournament from the film's opening sequence. The player controls a competitor in a capture-the-flag tournament, using both the Zapper light gun and the D-pad controller to aim and navigate scrolling levels simultaneously.

The game was marketed to support LJN's Entertech line of paintball and water guns. Critics gave the game mixed to positive reviews, praising its unique control scheme while criticizing its repetitive gameplay loop.

== Gameplay ==
The player assumes the role of a paintball competitor in a capture-the-flag tournament. The objective is to traverse a scrolling level, capture the enemy flag from the right side of the stage, and return it to the player's base on the left. To complete a stage, the player must avoid running out of ammunition or time.

The control scheme combines the Zapper with the D-pad controller. The player holds the Zapper in one hand to fire at enemies and uses the directional pad on the controller with the other hand to scroll the screen left or right. This setup allows independent movement and aiming, which retrospective critics described as unique but physically awkward.

The game features three levels: Woods, Warehouse District, and Snow Fields. Enemies in the Woods and Snow Fields levels wear military camouflage; the Warehouse District features enemies modeled after urban punks. The game loops through these three stages indefinitely, and enemy reaction times increase in speed with each subsequent loop. Ammunition is limited, and the player must replenish it by shooting ammo boxes hidden in the background or carried by enemies.

== Development and release ==
Gotcha! The Sport! was developed by the Japanese studio Atlus and published by LJN. This is a licensed adaptation of the 1985 film Gotcha!, without the spy-comedy premise and with only the paintball tournament. The soundtrack was composed by Hirohiko Takayama, who also worked on other LJN-published games such as The Karate Kid. Takayama stated that he approached every game soundtrack as "film music" rather than traditional game sound effects, with film composer influence including Ennio Morricone. He recalled: "Producers said, 'I want the game music!' I had a hard fight with that opinion every time."

The game was released in North America in November 1987.

LJN marketed it as a cross-promotional tie-in for its Entertech line of battery-operated water and paintball guns. Entertech produced physical toys using the Gotcha! branding, including the Enforcer double pistol set and the Commando rifle, which were sold alongside protective glasses and targets.

== Reception ==
Gotcha! The Sport! received mixed to positive reviews, and critics often praised its control innovation but criticized repetitive gameplay. In February 1988, Computer Entertainer gave it three stars out of three, stating "We know our Nintendo owners love games they can use with their Zappers and this one offers some good shooting ... Unlike other gun games available, you can lose by being shot by the enemy."

Retrospective reviews have highlighted the game's mechanics as a standout among the Zapper library. In 2008, NintendoAge e-Zine said, "The best part about this game is the difficulty ... you have little time to react to an enemy ... This is a pretty good game. ... My only real beef [is that its] lack of variety and visual progression do not motivate the player to continue much past level 4 or 5." In 2016, The A.V. Club praised the scrolling mechanic and said, "That's some okay Zapperin' right there. Quickly you realize that the game hardly ever changes, and you can basically see everything it has to offer within a few minutes. Light gun games are by necessity simple, but Gotcha! is too simple." In 2020, Questicle described the manual scrolling mechanic as "somewhat unique" but said the game was boring due to the repetitive loop.
