= Water fight =

Type of mock combat

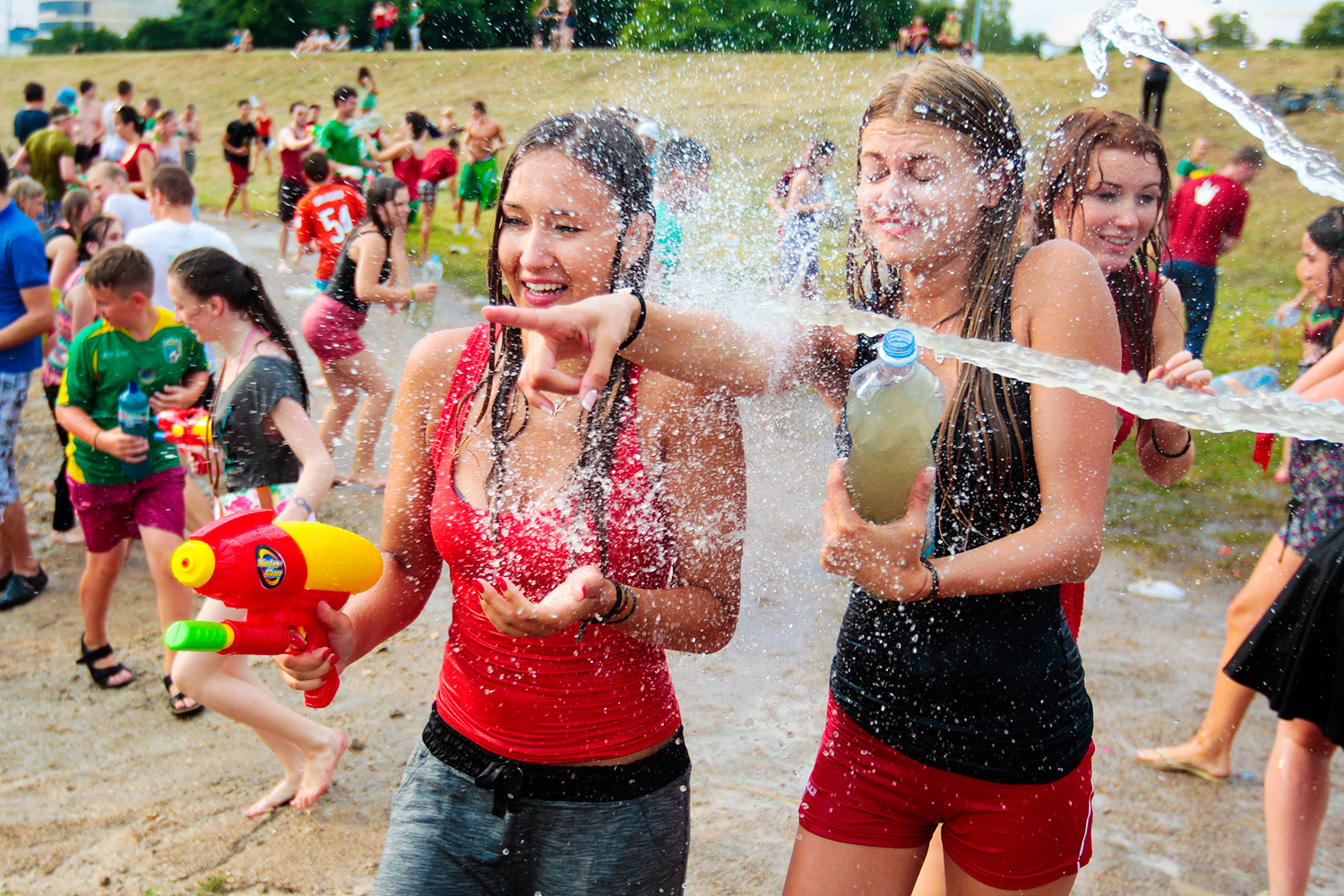
Water fight in Vilnius

A water fight, water battle or water war is a type of mock combat using various water-dispensing devices to soak opponents. Everything from buckets to water balloons to water guns and even cupped hands cradling water can be applied in a water fight. There are many different levels of game play used by those engaging in water fights, from quick, casual fights to long, objective-oriented-style water warfare campaigns, and tournament-style games. In most but not all cases, the common objective is to soak (spray with water) one's opponents while trying to remain dry. Water fights are most common in hot summer weather in order to cool off.

== History ==
It is unknown precisely when humans first began splashing their friends with water. Water play is exhibited by other animals such as monkeys or even elephants opting to spray themselves and others in an attempt to cool off during hotter months.

Splashing others with water has likely been around since humans first discovered that a cupped-hand can be used to cradle water within. As mankind learned to use various natural objects, then tools, the ability to carry and pour/dispense water upon others became more possible. One still used ploy is to simply fill a wide-mouthed object (i.e. a bucket or pot) with water such that one can heave a wave of water towards another using one's arms. Though accuracy and range of this type of water attack is minimal, at close range, it is quite possible to significantly soak another. This form of basic water combat is still employed today, particularly in Thailand during the Songkran festival.

There is little doubt humans have been splashing each other with water for a long time, particularly during hot days, as it seems to be a virtually instinctive act. Small infants and little children all enjoy splashing about in shallow wading pools or in the bathtub. Adolescents and adults often play pranks involving carefully positioned buckets of water atop doors or water balloons. However, these acts do not quite fall into the realm of the modern water fight definition, but do explain aspects of its origin.

Modern water fights are derived in many respects from actual military warfare. However, unlike actual combat, water fights are meant to either cool down during a hot day or to safely simulate some aspects of combat without the danger of inflicting serious injuries.

The primary objective, as noted earlier, is most typically to soak an opponent or opposing team without getting soaked, oneself. In less organized or casual cases, often the main objective is to cool down during a hot, summer day. There are still aspects of competitiveness present even in the most disorganized 'Soak-Fest'.

Unlike other mock competitive warfare games like Laser Tag or Paintball, determining whether a water attack is successful is still the topic of some debate, particularly for attempts at creating an organized game as opposed to a simple free-for-all (See Game Types below).

=== Wet Monday ===
Water fights are traditionally part of Easter Monday celebration (often referred to as 'Wet Monday' in some Roman Catholic countries, most notably Poland (known as 'Śmigus-Dyngus' or 'Lany poniedziałek', Slovakia ('Šibačka/Polievačka') and Czech Republic ('velikonoční pondělí' or 'pomlázka'). Traditionally, early in the morning boys awake girls by pouring a bucket of water on their head, however most recently it has changed to an all-out "water war" between the girls (who were traditionally the only accepted target, but nowadays attack the boys as fiercely as the boys used to attack them) and the boys (usually children in pre-school or early school age). It is also not uncommon for randomly selected pedestrians to be soaked with water by the children. Most common "weapons" are water guns, water balloons and buckets full of water.

== Water dispensing devices ==
=== Water guns ===
The original water guns were made of metal and fashioned after actual firearms. These early pistols did not dispense much water, but would likely be used like an early form of pepper spray, being filled with dangerous chemicals. Modern water weapons are much more capable of delivering larger volumes of water over greater distances.

=== Hoses and sprinklers ===
Common water dispensing devices, but are considered unfair or for refilling use only in most organized games due to the 'unlimited' nature of their water supply.

=== Water balloons ===
Small rubber balloons similar to party balloons, though usually much smaller, that can be used to dispense relatively large amounts of water to a target. Coming in a wide range of varieties, including multicolored and grenade color, water balloons are filled with water, tied and dispensed to a target (usually by hand). When a balloon reaches a target, the balloon usually breaks, resulting in the water covering the target. Water balloons are useful in several ways that soakers cannot be used. First, they have a wide blast radius, so if multiple targets are fairly close together, all or most can be soaked with only a single balloon. Also, this allows them for use when a target is behind a barrier, because a balloon does not have to directly hit a target to soak them, like a stream of water from a soaker. Secondly, balloons can dispense a larger amount of water to a target faster than most common soakers, and a user does not need a bulky, hard plastic soaker to soak a target. Disadvantages of water balloons are that less water can be carried by one person without a bag, and soakage range is dependent on the thrower's arm (except for launchers). Also, water balloons take longer to fill up and tie than soakers, and are rather fragile (they can often break when being transported, resulting in a wet user, not a wet target). Also, if playing with teams, one team may, for example, get a fort and the other may get access to water balloons.

== Festival ==
Children and youngsters in Maharashtra, India engage in water fights during the annual Rang Panchami festival. The Hindu festival involves them using water guns to try to wet each other. Many use coloured water, while others simply use plain water. The Rang Panchami festival is often called the "festival of colours" in English.

== Controversy ==
Water fights in Iran during the summer, when temperatures often reach 40 degrees Celsius, have led to arrests and been attacked by authorities as "corrupt", "shameful", "abnormal" behavior in disobedience of cultural principles. Water fights have been banned by the British police in Battersea Park and other parks around London.

== See also ==
- Snowball fight
- Songkran (Thailand)
- Super Soaker
- Water balloon
- Water gun
