= Killer: The Game of Assassination =

Role-playing game

- Killer: The Game of Assassination cover (Fourth edition, 1998)
- Designers: Steve Jackson
- Publishers: Steve Jackson Games
- Publication: 1981
- Genres: Live action role-playing game
- Languages: English

Killer: The Game of Assassination is a live action role-playing game derived from the traditional assassin game. Created by American game designer Steve Jackson and first published in 1981 or 1982 by his own game company, Steve Jackson Games, Killer is one of the oldest set of rules having been officially published to play the assassin game.

== Original editions ==
At least four editions of the game were published in the United States, all of them by Steve Jackson Games:

- 1st edition: 1981
- 2nd edition: 1985
- 3rd edition: 1992
- 4th edition: 1998

== Translations ==
In 1988 the second edition Killer was translated into French by the French game publisher Jeux Descartes. In 1991 it was translated too into Spanish by the Spanish game company Joc Internacional. In 1994 there was also an Italian translation.

== Reviews ==
- Challenge #70
- Jeux & Stratégie #13
- Jeux & Stratégie #21
- Jeux & Stratégie #57

== See also ==
- Steve Jackson Games
- Assassin (game)
