= Super Soaker =

Brand of recreational water gun

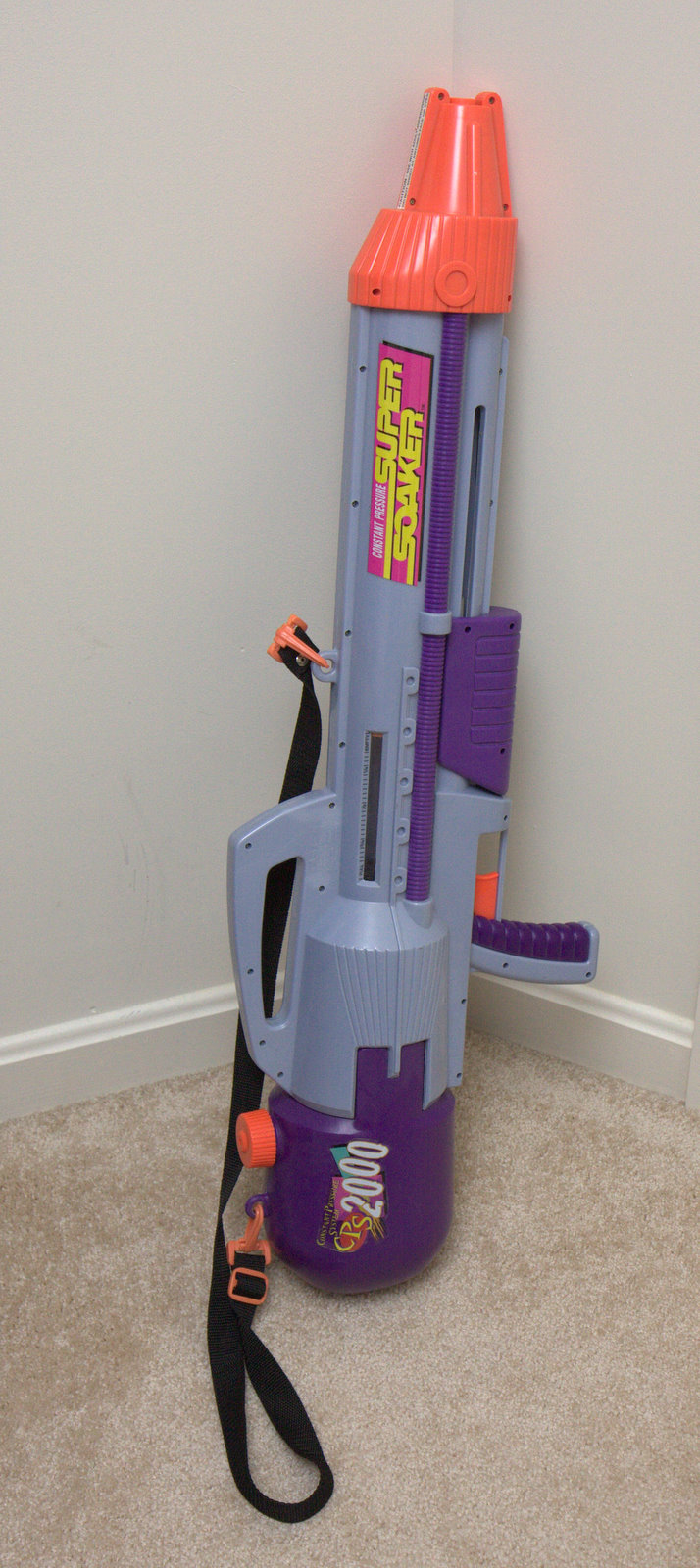
- Type: Water gun
- Invented by: Lonnie Johnson
- Company: Larami; Hasbro
- Country: United States
- Availability: 1990–present
- Materials: Plastic + metal and latex parts
- Slogan: "Wetter Is Better!" (classic) "It's Nerf or Nothin'!" (present)

Super Soaker is an American brand of recreational water gun that uses manually-pressurized air to shoot water with greater power, range, and accuracy than conventional squirt pistols. The Super Soaker was invented in 1989, by engineer Lonnie Johnson. The prototype combined PVC pipe, acrylic glass, and an empty plastic soda bottle.

Originally sold by Larami, and now produced by Hasbro under the Nerf brand, Super Soaker has generated more than $1 billion in total sales. The first Super Soaker went on sale in 1990, and was originally called the Power Drencher. Rebranding the name to Super Soaker occurred in 1991, together with a series of TV advertisements that resulted in two million water guns being sold. Super Soakers were popular for many years—so popular, in fact, that the term super soaker is sometimes used generically to refer to any type of toy pressurized water gun.

== History ==
In 1985, Air Force and NASA engineer Lonnie Johnson conceived of the idea of a pressurized water gun after shooting a powerful stream of water in his bathroom while performing experiments for a new type of refrigeration system. Several months later, he built a prototype in his basement using Plexiglas, PVC pipe, O-ring seals, and a two-liter soda bottle for the reservoir. Johnson originally wanted to produce the toy himself but the costs were too high. He attempted to arrange partnerships with toy companies to bring the product to market, and in 1989, he found success. While at the American International Toy Fair in New York City, he met the vice president of Larami, a toy company, who showed interest in the idea.

Johnson also built an improved prototype and made a successful sales pitch at the Larami headquarters in Philadelphia, Pennsylvania. Refinements made with Larami design director William Raucci and engineering consultant Bruce D'Andrade made its mass production feasible. The first commercial version of the water gun appeared in stores the following year as the Power Drencher. In 1991, it achieved commercial success under its new name, Super Soaker.

In 1992, Larami was sued for patent infringement by Talk to Me Products, who claimed the Super Soaker was a copy of their American Gladiator water gun, which was patented in 1978. However, Talk to Me Products lost their case as their patent referred to a water gun "having a chamber therein". The Super Soaker used a water chamber on top of the gun, which was detachable for filling.

The revenue that Johnson received from the Super Soaker licensing provided enough money for him to create Johnson Research & Development Co., Inc.

In 1995, Hasbro purchased Larami to produce toys under their name. Larami continued making toys and products under the Super Soaker brand up until 2002, when Larami closed permanently. In its place, Hasbro produced Super Soakers in-house. The brand continued to exist as its own separate entity until 2010, when it was merged with the Nerf brand.

In 2022, Hasbro and WowWee partnered to create a new line of Super Soaker products.

== Technology ==
=== Piston pumper ===
Piston water guns have been produced for many years. These guns do not have triggers; they are fired simply by pumping. Although this design feature allows them to reload rapidly, piston pumpers tend to have less range and less power than other designs.

=== Air pressure with pressurized reservoir ===
Originally made popular by the Super Soaker 50, pressurized reservoir systems are still common for small water guns. A water gun using this system is pressurized by air being pumped and compressed into its reservoir. When the trigger is pulled, a valve is opened and the compressed air pushes the water out of the nozzle.

Super Soaker started with two pressurized reservoir water guns, and has continued to produce them in various shapes and sizes.

=== Air pressure with separate chamber ===
This is a more powerful air pressure system that was also first introduced by Super Soaker. It is designed so that water is pumped from the reservoir into an empty plastic container. As the water is pumped in, the air sitting inside becomes compressed. When the trigger is pulled, the valve opens and the compressed air forces the water out. The brand first used separate air pressure in 1991 on the Super Soaker 100 and has since used the technology in many other water guns.

=== Spring-powered ===
Super Soaker has made a few spring-powered water guns. They first made the Quick Blast in 2008. The Quick Blast was a triggerless gun which functioned similarly to piston pumpers, but had a spring-loaded piston inside. The Quick Blast had a firing valve, which automatically opened once a certain pressure was reached. The spring would then push the water out the nozzle.

The Super Soaker Shot Blast, released in 2010, used a system nearly identical to the Quick Blast with different styling.

In 2013, Super Soaker produced the Flash Blast. While this blaster was spring-powered, this pistol-sized blaster used a system different from the previous two. Its slide was cocked back once. Then the trigger was pulled, firing a short stream of water. Function of this gun is similar to Nerf guns.

=== Motorized ===
Super Soaker later made many motorized water guns. In 2011, they released the Thunderstorm, which used an electric pump to push water directly out the nozzle. In 2012, Super Soaker made two motorized water guns: The Lightningstorm, a reproduction of the Thunderstorm with added accessories, and the Electrostorm, a smaller motorized gun. Each required four AA batteries to work.

=== CPS (Constant Pressure System) ===
The Constant Pressure System is the most powerful system used by Super Soaker. The user pumps water from the reservoir into a rubber bladder, which expands as more water is forced into it. The stretched rubber exerts a constant pressure on the water, giving the blaster a thick and constant stream throughout the entire shot. In most older models, the resulting blast is forceful enough that recoil can be felt.

Hasbro has implemented the Constant Pressure System in Super Soaker blasters a number of times since completing the takeover of Larami Corp in 2002. The most recent implementation was in the 2011 'Hydro Cannon', while the largest post-takeover pressure chamber (at 900ml) is found in the 2007 'HydroBlitz' blaster.

== Original series models of Super Soakers ==
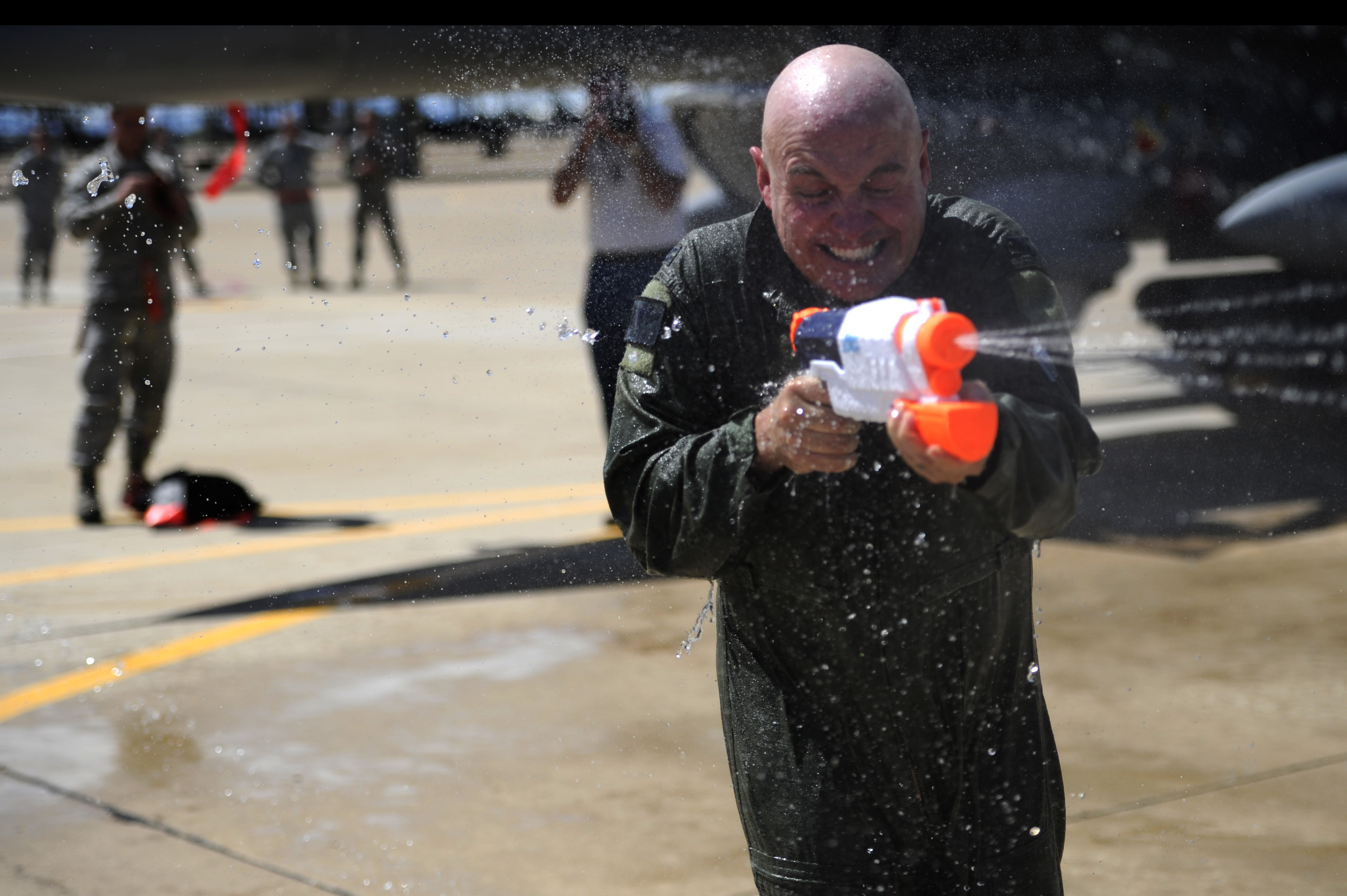
Airman using a Super Soaker

The following are the original models of Super Soaker guns:

Super Soaker 10
Weighing less than three ounces, the SS10 was a sub-compact, pistol-type model that was easily concealable due to its small size (56 mL tank volume, model year 1993)
Super Soaker 20
The SS20 was a pistol-type model which came with an either a rear-mounted or a grip-mounted pump. (115 mL tank volume, model year 1992)
Super Soaker 25
Designed with the grip-mounted pump, the SS25 came with a belt and additional, surplus water tank. (177 mL tank volume, model year 1992)
Super Soaker 30
The original pistol-sized gun, the SS30 was released with the very first models in 1991. While only slightly heavier than the SS20, it holds more than twice the water in its reservoir. (265 mL tank volume, model year 1991)
Super Soaker 40
With a design similar to that of the classic SS50, the SS40 possessed somewhat more compact size dimensions. While it also came with a significantly smaller water reservoir, the SS40 was a later model of more durable construction and was touted on its accompanying packaging as "the most powerful watergun ever!" (490 mL tank volume, model year 1993)
Super Soaker 50
The original mid-size weapon, the SS50 was a best-selling model. Known for its impressive range due to its novel air pressure system, the SS50 has become a cultural icon. In 2015, the SS50 was the model exemplified when the Super Soaker brand was nominated for the National Toy Hall of Fame. (730 mL tank volume, model year 1991)
Super Soaker MDS
An acronym for "Multi-directional system", and the first of the "gimmick" blasters, the MDS had a nozzle that could be turned at angles independently of the gun itself. This was advertised as being useful for firing around corners. It was also slightly larger than the SS 50, and made of slightly more modern and durable construction like the SS 40. Like the SS100, it has a separate pressure reservoir.
Super Soaker 60
The SS60 was, in effect, a repainted MDS but with the MDS gimmick removed. This made it a cheaper, lighter alternative to the SS 100
Super Soaker 100
Befitting its triple-digit number designation, this larger-sized weapon was the biggest Super Soaker until the release of the SS200. It came with a weight and tank reservoir double that of most mid-sized models, and was accordingly known for its range and capacity (1500 mL tank volume, model year 1991). It was the first soaker to have a separate pressure chamber.
Super Soaker 200
The biggest and heaviest of all the original weapons until the release of the SS300, the Super Soaker 200 came with a carry-strap to increase its ergonomics. This model also came with dual full-size water tanks, a large pressure chamber, and multiple, adjustable nozzle settings. (2050 mL tank volume, model year 1992)
Super Soaker 300
Armed with three air-pressured firing chambers and a large 6.5 L tank, the backpack-fed Super Soaker 300 came with an appropriately wider nozzle-opening for increased output. While the model had some weight and durability issues, it possessed the ability to outclass all other models, particularly in terms of sheer water volume (6500 mL tank volume, model year 1993). Larami did not make another backpack soaker until the CPS 3000.

=== Super Soaker XP series ===
Unlike the classic super soaker series or the CPS series, the XP ("eXtra Power") series did not have a linear relationship between the model number and the size and power of the gun. It also coexisted with the Classic series for a number of years before replacing them. Some unsuccessful concepts, such as quick-twist tanks, were experimented with and abandoned during this transition period. By the time the Classic series had been fully phased out in 1996, the XP series had settled on the following lineup:

XP 15
As a micropistol and the smallest XP soaker ever made, this was roughly equivalent to the SS 10
XP 35
As a light rifle, this arguably filled the same role as the former SS 30
XP 65
As a medium rifle, this was the effective replacement for the SS 50
XP 105
As a heavy rifle, and as the lightest one still in production with a separate pressure reservoir, this effectively replaced the SS 100. It debuted with a pressure gauge to how much air pressure remained after using the hand pump.
XP 110
Featuring 3 tanks (2 smaller secondaries and a primary) and a water pressure gauge.
XXP 175
Featuring two tanks and two barrels, and being the second-largest blaster in the lineup, this was the successor to the SS 200
XXP 275
Despite being a single-piece blaster, this inherited many design principles from the SS 300, such as the fact that it was fired by pulling a lever on top of the barrel rather than by pulling a trigger.

These were replaced every two years by successive generations of models until finally the XP series itself was replaced by the Max-D series.

=== Super Soaker CPS series ===
The Super Soaker CPS 2000 is a Constant Pressure System (CPS) class water gun released in 1996 by Larami. It was the first model in the CPS line, which initially included only a single blaster. While a fearsome sight, it was often acknowledged as being overpowered, depleting its pressure chamber too quickly, and needing pumping too frequently. A second version of the CPS 2000 was released shortly after, though Larami did not announce or publicly acknowledge any changes.

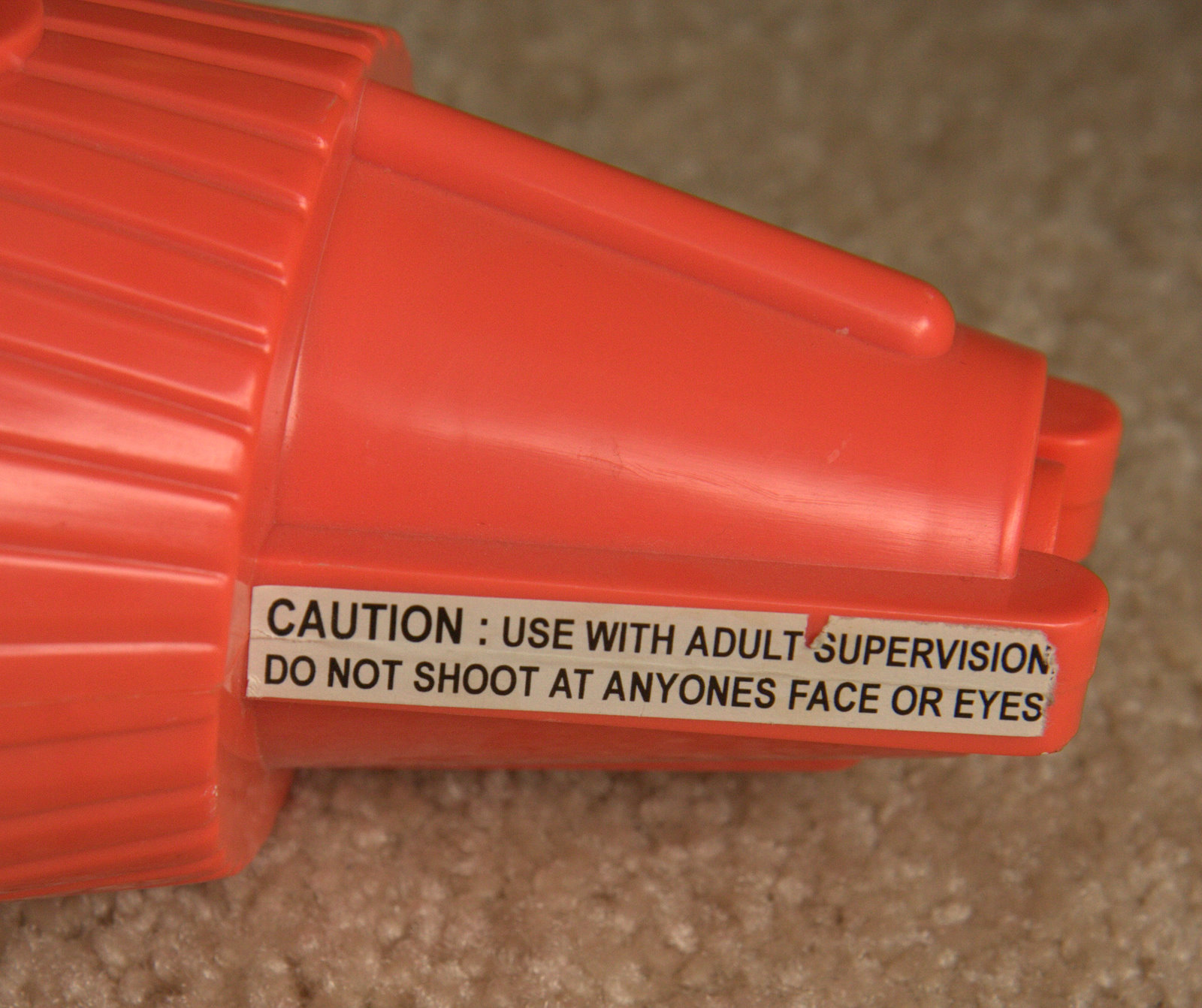
CPS 2000's warning label

After two years, the CPS 2000 was discontinued, and four new CPS blasters were launched:

CPS 1000
The molded casing made this appear to have only a single, spherical pressure reservoir
CPS 1500
The molded casing made this appear to have two spherical pressure reservoirs
CPS 2500
By far the most similar in appearance to the CPS 2000, but with an adjustable nozzle for more moderate output and longer-lasting shots, this was once said by Lonnie Johnson to be his favorite Super Soaker model
CPS 3000
The first backpack blaster since the SS 300, and the second one ever.

After two more years, those models were replaced by the CPS 1200, 1700, 2700, and 3200. After two more years, the final CPS models were the 2100 and 4100.

== Awards ==
In 2011, the Nerf Super Soaker Shot Blast was awarded "Outdoor Toy of the Year" at the 11th Annual Toy of the Year Awards, which is held at the American International Toy Fair in New York City.

In 2015, Super Soaker was inducted to the National Toy Hall of Fame.

== Legal issues ==
In 2010, Hasbro successfully sued Buzz Bee Toys for patent infringement. Hasbro claimed that Buzz Bee Toys infringed on a patent related to its "Super Soaker water toy." Although it is unknown exactly what the dispute was over, it is likely that Hasbro was suing for the Water Warriors Hydro-Power water guns, which were becoming too similar to Super Soaker's Constant Pressure System. Since then, the Water Warriors line has not contained a single Hydro-Power water gun.

In November 2013, Lonnie Johnson and his company, Johnson Research and Development Co., were awarded nearly US$73 million following a dispute with Hasbro over underpaid royalties from 2007 to 2012.

== See also ==
- Entertech – Defunct line of water guns from the 1980s by LJN Toys
- Oozinator – Toy water gun
- Water Warriors – Competing brand by Buzz Bee Toys
- Xploderz – Toy gun line by The Maya Group that uses water-based pellets
