= Nerf =

American toy brand

NERF
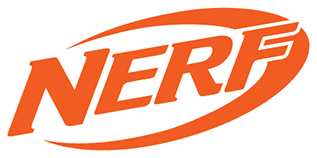
- Product type: Toy weapons
- Current owner: Hasbro
- Country: United States
- Introduced: 1969; 57 years ago
- Markets: Worldwide
- Previous owners: Parker Brothers; Kenner; Larami
- Tagline: "It's Nerf or Nothin'!"
- Website: shop.hasbro.com/en-us/nerf

Nerf is a toy brand formed by Parker Brothers and currently owned by Hasbro. Most of the toys are a variety of foam-based weaponry, with other Nerf products including balls for sports such as American football, basketball, and baseball. Their best known toys are their dart guns (referred to by Hasbro as "blasters") that shoot ammunition made from "Nerf foam" (partially reticulated polyether type polyurethane foam). Their primary slogan, introduced in the 1990s, is "It's Nerf or Nothin'!". Annual revenues under the Nerf brand are approximately US$400 million.

== History ==
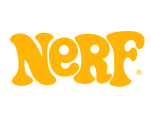
Original Nerf logo (1969–1990)

Parker Brothers originally developed Nerf, beginning with a four-inch (100 mm) polyurethane foam ball. In 1969, Reyn Guyer, a Minnesota-based games inventor, and Minnesota Vikings kicker Fred Cox came to the company with a football game that was safe for indoor play, and after studying it carefully, Parker Brothers decided to eliminate everything but the foam ball. The inventors' in-house name for the ball was the "falsie-ball", referencing the sculpted padding for bras used to create the appearance of larger breasts. Parker Brothers instead chose the name "Nerf", taken from Nerf bars, the protective tubing used to avoid minor collisions during off-roading.

In 1970, the Nerf ball was introduced as the "world's first official indoor ball". Marketing slogans promised that one can "Throw it indoors; you can't damage lamps or break windows. You can't hurt babies or old people." Some of the first TV commercials for the balls were joint promotions with General Foods' Kool-Aid drink mix, with Micky Dolenz, Davy Jones and Michael Nesmith of the Monkees playing with the balls on a living room soundstage (Kool-Aid sponsored the 1969–70 Saturday morning reruns of the Monkees' 1966–67 TV series). The ball filled a strong consumer need and by the year's end, more than four million Nerf balls had been sold. The four-inch (100 mm) ball was followed by a large version called the "Super Nerf Ball". Shortly after, in 1972, a basketball game called "Nerfoop" and the Nerf football (developed by longtime NFL kicker Fred Cox) joined the family, with the latter quickly becoming Nerf's most popular ball.

The company continued to add to the Nerf line until they handed control to Kenner Products, a sister company. In 1987, Kenner was bought by the Tonka Corporation, which itself was purchased by Hasbro in 1991, which then became the owner of Nerf. Throughout the 1990s and early 2000s, the Nerf brand served under the subsidiaries OddzOn and Larami before Hasbro took full control of the brand.

Nerf released the first foam dart blaster in 1992. Over the years, Nerf has continued to expand the line, adding new looks to existing products, with later lines of Nerf products ranging from sport balls and foam dart blasters to video games and accessories.

In February 2013, Hasbro announced the launch of a new product line called Rebelle, designed to appeal to a female demographic. The line featured blasters with aesthetics and color schemes distinct from other Nerf lines, while maintaining internal mechanics similar to the N-Strike Elite series. The first Rebelle products were released later that year.

Later in November 2013, POW! Books released The Ultimate Nerf Blaster Book, written by Nathaniel Marunas. The publication chronicled the brand’s evolution and provided detailed information on all N-Strike, Dart Tag, and Vortex blasters available at the time of release.

In 2015, Nerf introduced the Rival series, aimed at older users seeking greater performance. The initial blasters in this line, the Apollo XV-700 and Zeus MXV-1200, fired a new type of foam ammunition called High Impact Rounds—spherical projectiles capable of reaching higher velocities than traditional darts. Rival products are generally recommended for ages 14 and up.

Continuing its innovation in foam-based ammunition, Nerf unveiled the Hyper series in 2021. The initial offerings—Hyper Rush-40, Hyper Siege-50, and Hyper Mach-100—featured a new type of round similar in concept to Rival’s, but smaller and composed of a thermoplastic elastomer material, offering a more rubber-like texture compared to traditional foam.

== Products ==
=== Nerf Blasters ===
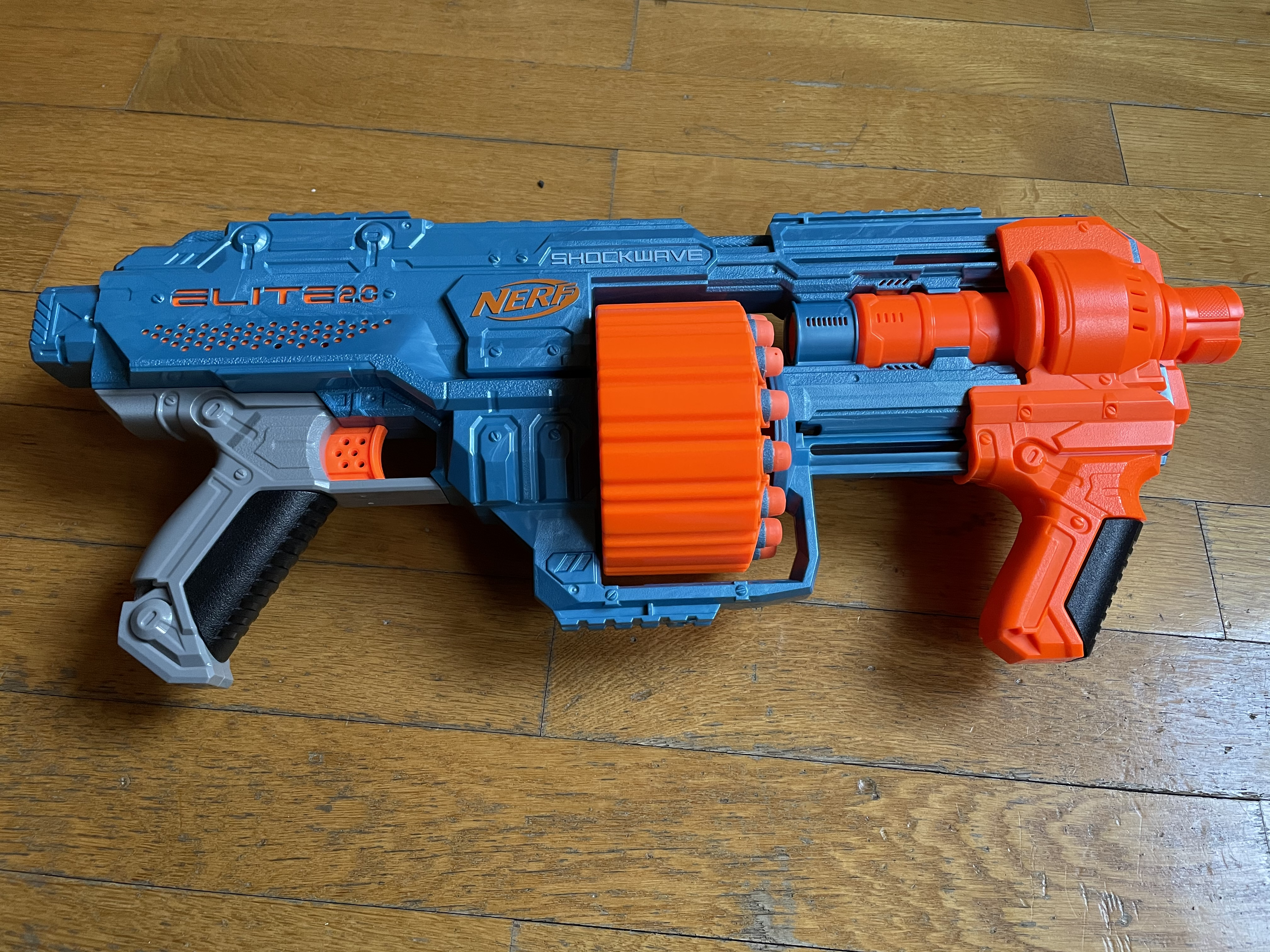
Nerf Elite 2.0 Shockwave RD-15

Nerf's most popular product type are Nerf blasters, which are toy plastic guns that shoot foam darts. These darts have different-style tips, including Velcro-tipped in order to stick to Nerf vests (typically shipped with Dart Tag blasters), suction cup darts designed to stick to smooth surfaces, streamlined darts to fit into magazines (referred to as clips by Nerf), and darts able to whistle in flight. Darts may also have different colors, such as colors that reflect certain sub-lines, camouflage, and glow in the dark. Most Nerf blasters also have rails, known as tactical rails, which can accommodate different attachments, as well as special adapters such as barrel and stock adapters. The "N-strike" sub-line was launched in 2004, and is styled more like a real weapon than previous Nerf products. It was updated in 2012 as N-Strike Elite.

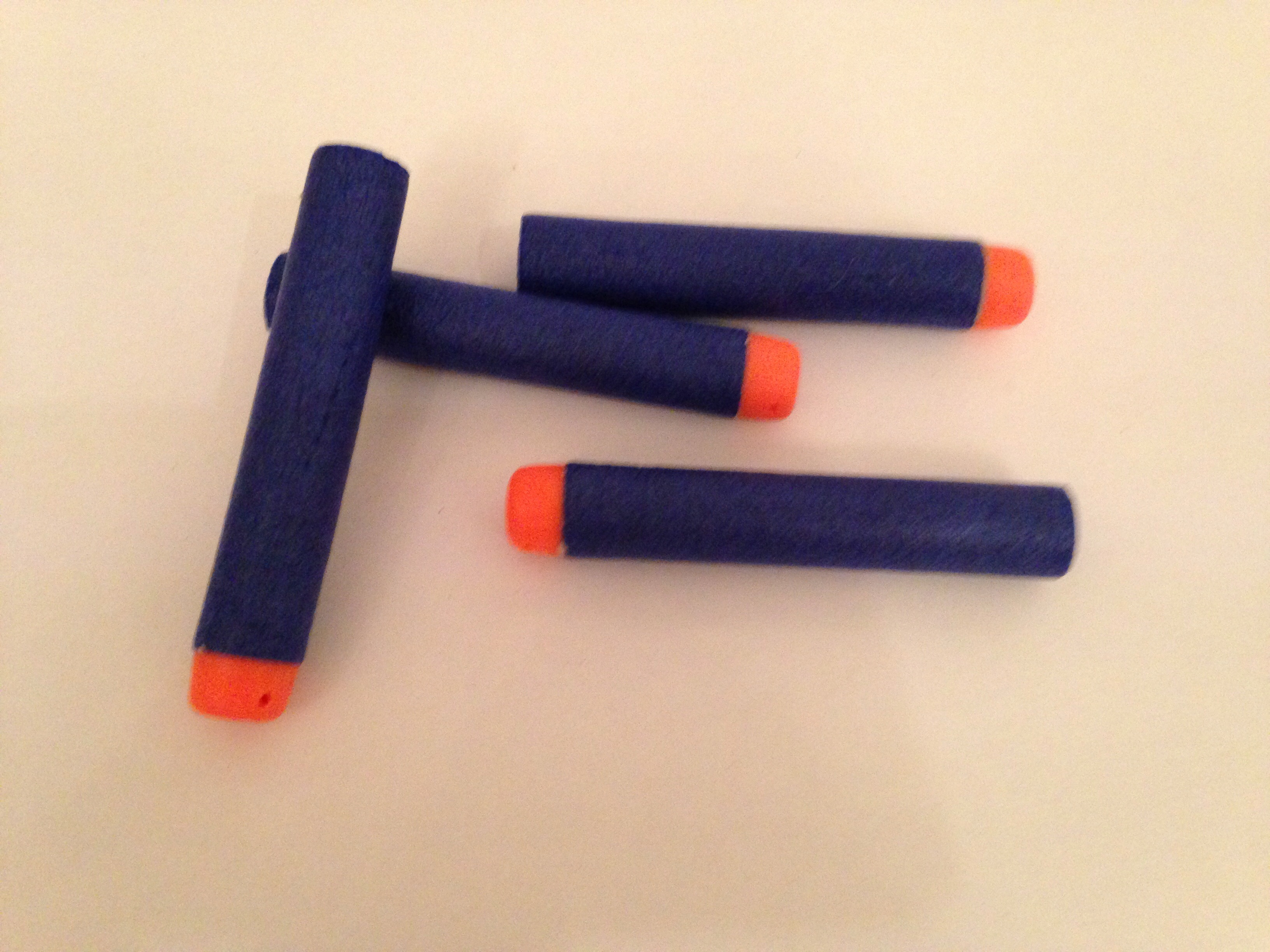
Nerf N-Strike Elite Darts

==== Rebelle ====
Released in 2013, the Rebelle line was a series of blasters predominantly aimed at the female demographic, with similar internal mechanics to the Nerf N-Strike elite line, sporting pink, purple and teal colors.

==== Zombie Strike ====
The Zombie Strike line was launched in 2013, and is geared for fans of Humans vs. Zombies games.

==== Rival ====
Nerf Rival blasters are targeted towards an older target market than Nerf's better-known dart blasters.

==== Nitro ====
In 2017, Hasbro released the Nerf Nitro line, which consists of blasters that fire foam cars into obstacles and stunt ramps.

==== Ultra ====
Released in September 2019, Nerf Ultra (branded as ULTRA) blasters fire a new, proprietary dart design that is marketed as "THE FARTHEST FLYING DART EVER. Darts can travel up to 120 feet." The new Ultra darts are constructed from a lightweight foam that is notably different from traditional darts in that they are made with closed-cell, rather than open-cell foam. This construction allows for fins to be molded into the rear of the darts. Size-wise, Ultra darts are between N-Strike Elite darts and Mega darts in diameter, but shorter than both in length. They cannot be fired from any previous Nerf line or off-brand compatible blasters, nor can any other lines' darts be fired from Ultra blasters. This design was created in response to the growing number of third-party darts, including exact knockoffs from China, available for N-Strike Elite blasters at a much lower cost than Nerf-brand darts.

=== N-Series ===
Released in mid‑2024, the N-Series introduced the proprietary N1 dart: a shorter, wider, and aerodynamically optimized foam dart that was only compatible with N-Series blasters. Hasbro had stated that it planned to phase out the Elite dart, however in 2026, the N1 dart was discontinued and the Elite dart was reinstated as the primary dart type for the Nerf brand moving forward with the announcement of the Rebel Ops line.

=== Super Soaker ===
Originally owned and marketed by Larami, Super Soaker is a popular line of water guns. Recently, Hasbro has released a line of Nerf-branded Super Soaker blasters.

=== Lazer Tag ===
Lazer Tag, a popular laser tag toy line from the mid-1980s, is also currently part of the Nerf banner. The current generation of Lazer Tag blasters attach to iPhones or iPod Touch units for enhanced playability.

=== Nerf Dog ===
In June 2013, Hasbro and Grammercy Products unveiled Nerf Dog, a line of Nerf-inspired canine retrieving toys made of rubber, nylon, and plastic. Nerf Dog was launched at Walmart stores, and debuted at pet specialty stores in Fall 2013.

Based in Secaucus, N.J., Gramercy Products, Inc. is the manufacturer of Nerf Dog products.

The Nerf Dog Tennis Ball Blaster mimics traditional Nerf blaster designs and shoots a ball up to 50 feet (15 m). The toy uses special softer balls to reduce the risk of injury.

=== Nerf Wild ===
Launched in April 2024, this series features simplified "wild"-themed blasters such as Lionfury and Sharkfire, designed for younger children with easy-to-use mechanisms and playful animal designs.

=== Nerf Pro ===
Introduced a new enthusiast-oriented line, starting with motorized half-dart models like Stryfe X (October 2023) and later the Pro Torrent, Sender, and GelFire gel-blaster variants in 2024. These products are aimed at more competitive players and use high-performance darts at velocities up to 150 feet per second (46 m/s).

=== Nerf Sports ===
In early 2025, Hasbro and Franklin Sports unveiled the Nerf Sports lineup at the New York Toy Fair. Products include glow-in-the-dark and color-changing AirTee, Vortex Rocket Footballs, QuietCourt indoor basketballs, Air Hoop, QB Pro Throw, and LightStrike Vortex Football—designed for versatile play both indoors and outdoors.

=== Nerf Loadout ===
Announced at the 2025 Toy Fair, this customizable modular line includes models like FrostFusion, Galactic Commander, ShadowSpeed Recon, Arctic ZeroStriker, CyberLight Ghost, and FlareFusion. Each supports multiple attachment combinations and uses N-Series N1 darts.

=== Video games ===
Nerf has also produced video game accessories for the PlayStation 2, Nintendo DSi, DS Lite, 3DS and the Wii. The first appearance of Nerf ammunition in a video game was in Bubsy II, where Bubsy could equip a Ballzooka. Hasbro Interactive released the first-person shooter Nerf Arena Blast (or NAB, sometimes Arena Blast) and the light-gun shooter Nerf Jr. Foam Blaster: Attack of the Kleptons! in 1999. EA Games, in association with Hasbro, released the 2008 video game Nerf N-Strike and its 2009 sequel Nerf N-Strike Elite. Both games feature the Switch Shot EX-3, which doubles as a functional dart blaster and a Wii Remote accessory. In June 2019, Raw Thrills released the Nerf Arcade game. GameMill Entertainment published Nerf Legends, a first-person shooter game released on 19 November 2021 for Microsoft Windows, Nintendo Switch, PlayStation 4, PlayStation 5, Xbox One and Xbox Series X/S. In 2021, an online multiplayer first-person shooter titled Nerf Strike was developed by The Gang Stockholm and released by Metaverse Team under license from Hasbro on the online platform Roblox. In August 2022, developers Secret Location under licence from Hasbro released the Virtual reality game multiplayer shooter titled NERF Ultimate Championships for the Meta Quest platform. In February 2023 Secret Location announced on a now deleted developer update on the Meta Horizon Store listing that the studio was shutting down, meaning that support for NERF Ultimate Championships will soon end it will be delisted off the Meta Horizon Store. The game was shut down and subsequently delisted on August 31, 2023. April 2023, they collaborated with the game Stumble Guys to add a Nerf-themed mini game to their game.

== Awards ==
- In 2011, the Nerf N-Strike Stampede ECS was awarded "Boy Toy of the Year" and the Nerf Super Soaker Shot Blast won "Outdoor Toy of the Year" at the 11th Annual Toy of the Year Awards, which is held at the American International Toy Fair in New York City.
- In 2014, the Nerf Zombie Strike Crossfire Bow won the award for "Best Action Toy" at the 2014 U.K. Toy Fair.

== Legal issues ==
In June 2010, Hasbro sued Buzz Bee Toys and Lanard Toys for patent violation of its Nerf and Super Soaker brands. The lawsuit stated that Buzz Bee and Lanard infringed two U.S. patents for the Nerf N-Strike Disc Shot blaster, while Buzz Bee infringed on a Super Soaker patent. In November of that year, Hasbro won its patent case against Buzz Bee with the latter banned from producing certain water guns.

In April 2012, Hasbro contacted the Australia-based fan blog Urban Taggers for leaking information on unreleased Nerf products found on the Chinese marketplace website Taobao. Hasbro allegedly tricked one of the bloggers into disclosing his home address for their lawyers to mail him a cease and desist letter. The incident resulted in fans setting up a campaign on Facebook boycotting Hasbro.

== In popular culture ==
In video game design and balancing, "Nerf" is used as a verb for lowering the power level of a mechanic that is deemed as being too strong or unbalanced, due to the fact many Nerf branded toys tend to be softer than their real-world counterparts. The opposite of this term is "buff", which refers to strengthening a mechanic that is seen as being too weak or underpowered.

== See also ==
- Nerf (video gaming) – Concept in game design
- Nerf war – War involving toys by Nerf
