= Larami =

American Toy Company

Larami Corp.
- Company type: Subsidiary
- Industry: Toys
- Founded: 1959
- Founder: David W. Ring
- Defunct: 2002
- Successor: Nerf
- Products: Water guns, action figures
- Parent: Hasbro

The Larami Corporation was a toy company established by David W. Ring in Philadelphia, Pennsylvania, in 1959. It produced licensed toys based on movies and television shows. Often low-quality, these were manufactured in Hong Kong and Japan for sale on grocery store toy aisle racks for under a dollar.

By the 1980s, Larami had a growing water gun product line, and launched the Super Soaker brand in 1991. In 1995, it was acquired by Hasbro Inc, which renamed it Larami Inc. before retiring it in 2002.

== History ==
In 1947, David W. Ring and his brother founded Ring Brothers Toy Wholesale, selling toys to retailers out of the back of his car. Ring founded the Larami Corporation in 1959 after being introduced to toy imports during a trip to Japan earlier that year. Larami specialized in low-cost, low-quality licensed toys based on popular movies and television shows during the 1960s and 1970s, toy guns, and toy water guns. During the 1980s, Larami expanded its water gun line, licensing designs for a battery-operated water gun from inventor Alan Amron in 1984. By 1987, Alvin Davis and Myung Song had become co-owners of Larami.

At the 1989 North American International Toy Fair in New York City, Davis and Song met former Jet Propulsion Lab engineer Lonnie Johnson. After being impressed by his prototype of a pressurized water-air reservoir, Larami licensed his designs and developed the Power Drencher. In 1991, the Power Drencher line was relaunched as the Super Soaker. Talk To Me Products filed suit against Larami in 1993, alleging that the Super Soaker infringed on their 1978 patent for a battery-powered water gun. On March 11, 1993, Talk To Me Products' claims were dismissed, as their patent referred to a water gun "having a chamber therein". Instead, the Super Soaker had a detachable chamber at the top of the water gun.

Larami was acquired by Hasbro Inc in 1995. Hasbro continued to manufacture Super Soakers under the Larami name until 2002, when Hasbro began marketing the Super Soaker as part of the Nerf line.

== Products ==
Larami toys were produced based on several movies, television shows, etc. By the 1980s, Larami Corp. had a growing water gun product line. It was Larami Corp. that eventually marketed and sold the Power Drencher, rebranded as the Super Soaker in 1991 which was based on the pressurized water-air reservoir invented and developed by the former Jet Propulsion Engineer Dr. Lonnie Johnson and Larami designer William Raucci.

=== Movies ===
- Batman Forever
- One Hundred and One Dalmatians
- Planet of the Apes
- Star Wars

=== Television shows ===
- The A-Team
- The Amazing Chan and the Chan Clan
- The Banana Splits
- Batman
- Battlestar Galactica
- The Brady Bunch
- CHiPs
- Deputy Dawg
- Hawaii Five-0
- Knight Rider
- Land of the Lost
- The Man from U.N.C.L.E.
- The Mod Squad
- Space: 1999
- Star Trek
- Underdog

=== Battlestar Galactica Cylon Bubble Machine ===
Battlestar Galactica Cylon Bubble Machine in its packaging

In 1978, Larami created a Cylon soap bubble toy called the Battlestar Galactica Cylon Bubble Machine to coincide with the television series of the same name. In the same year, a commercial was also made for the product featuring its use in dispensing "big bunches of bubbles" and a jingle. The jingle was described in one review as "amazingly goofy with a chorus yelping, 'Battlestar Galacticaaaaaaaaaaaaaaaaaaaaaa ...CYLON BUBBLE MACHINE!'" and in an interview Re-imagined Series comics writer Greg Pak as said "I still periodically find myself humming the tune song [sic] to the Cylon Bubble Machine commercial." In a Los Angeles Times article covering Battlestar Galactica's influence on Facebook, the toy's Facebook Fan Page is noted alongside the book The Science of Battlestar Galactica's.
