= Buzz Bee Toys =

American-Hong Kong toy company

- Type: Toys
- Country: United States; Hong Kong
- Materials: Plastic, foam
- Official website

Buzz Bee Toys is an American/Hong Kong toy company created in 2002. They currently produce under several private label brands such as Adventure Force for Walmart and their own brands of Air Warriors and Water Warriors.

== Brands ==
=== Air Warriors ===
Air Warriors is a line of air-operated dart blasters.

=== Water Warriors ===
First released in 2003, Water Warriors is a line of pressurized water guns, similar to earlier Super Soaker blasters. The blasters are technically the most powerful water guns sold today, though it has been proven that the larger models can be difficult for small children to handle.

=== Others ===
Originally called Air Blasters, Air Warriors is a line of foam dart guns, similar to Hasbro's Nerf Blasters line. A few of the Air Blasters products also shoot missiles or marshmallows. Air Warriors Jr. Sports consists of toy sports equipment such as foam balls, basketball hoops and pogo sticks. The Ruff Stuff Electronics line consists of realistic toy guns that make electronic sound effects. Ruff Stuff Fun Foam is a line of foam toys such as flying discs, footballs, swords and flashlights. The Purebred Collection is a currently discontinued line of toy animals.

== Lawsuit ==
In June 2010, Hasbro sued Buzz Bee Toys and Lanard Toys for patent violation of its Nerf and Super Soaker brands. The lawsuit, filed in the United States District Court for the District of Massachusetts, stated that Buzz Bee and Lanard infringed two U.S. patents for the Nerf N-Strike Disc Shot blaster, while Buzz Bee infringed on a Super Soaker patent. In November, Hasbro won its patent case against Buzz Bee with the latter banned from producing any more "Hydropower" water guns. The suit was filed as Hasbro Inc v. Buzz Bee Toys Inc, United States District Court, District of Massachusetts, No. 10-cv-10906.
