= Water gun =

Type of toy gun designed to shoot water

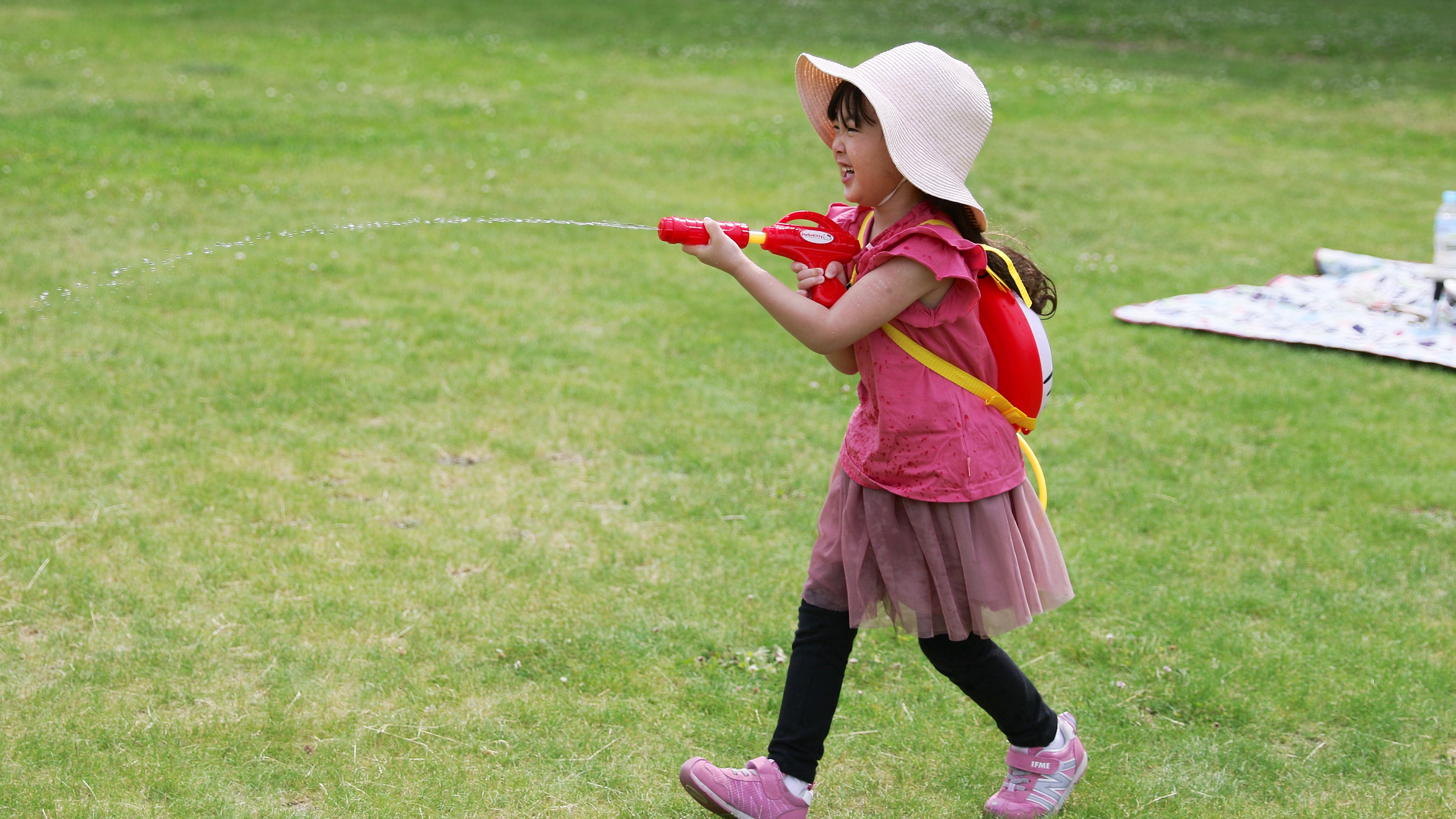
A young girl playing with a water gun

A water gun (or water pistol, water blaster, or squirt gun) is a type of toy gun designed to shoot jets of water. Similar to water balloons, the primary purpose of the toy is to soak another person in a recreational game such as a water fight.

Historically, water guns were made of metal and used rubber squeeze bulbs to load and propel water through a nozzle like a Pasteur pipette. While the oldest surviving example of a squirt gun dates to J.W. Wolff's June 30, 1896 patent, depictions of children using water-spraying devices date back to at least the 16th century. In Pieter Bruegel the Elder's painting Children's Games (1560), a child appears to be using a squirt toy to spray water, suggesting early forms of water guns. The oldest known reference to a squirt gun is dated thirty-five years prior to Wolff’s patent, with General William T. Sherman's 1861 quote regarding the effort to quell secession: "Why, you might as well attempt to put out the flames of a burning house with a squirt-gun."

For several years in the United States and Canada, import regulations and domestic laws have required squirt guns to be made of clear or tinted transparent plastic to make them harder to mistake for actual firearms.

== Types ==
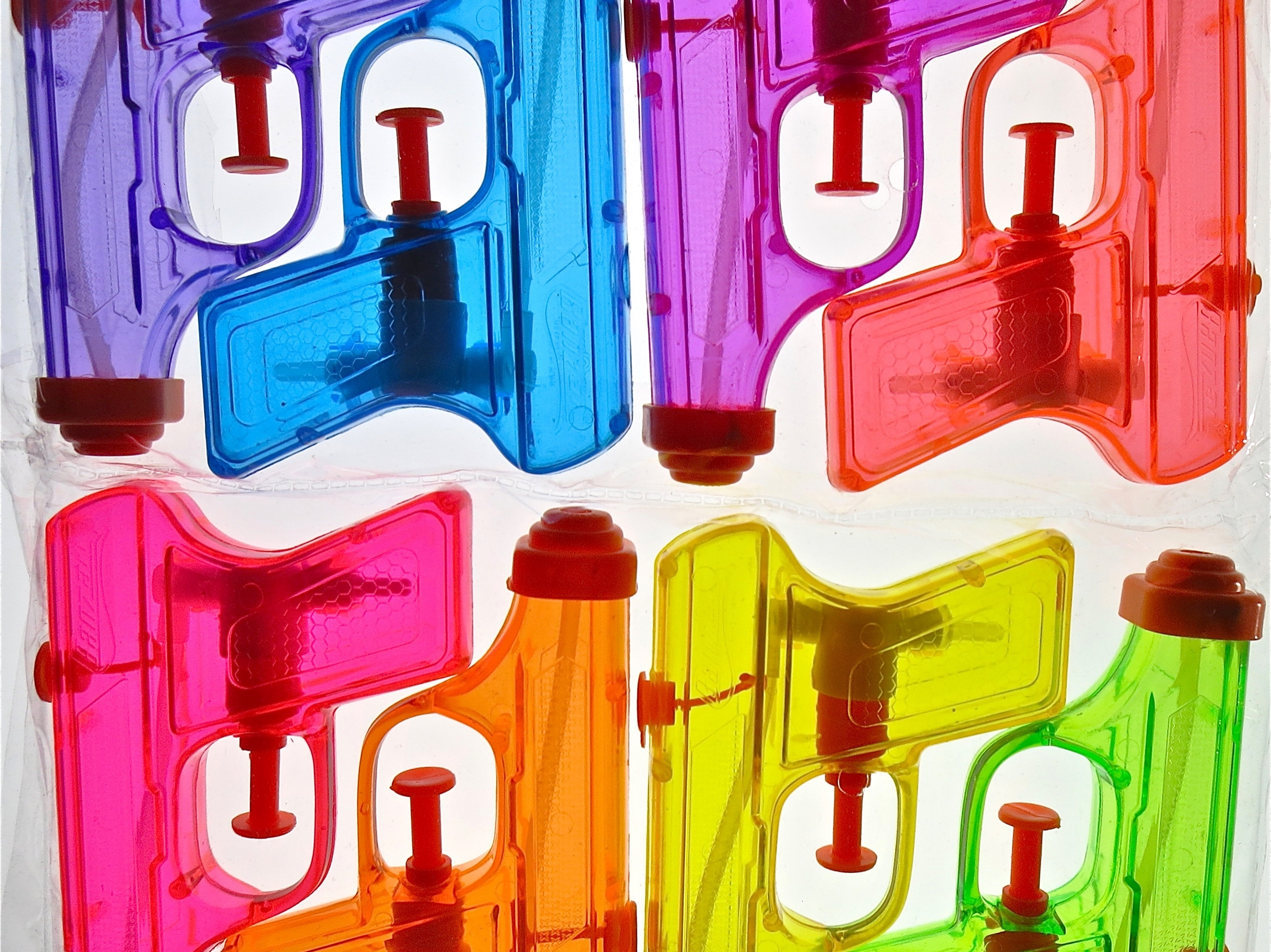
Multiple water guns in different colors

=== Squeeze bulbs ===
Akin to water droppers, the oldest known manufactured water guns utilized a simple rubber squeeze bulb into which water could be drawn, then forcibly expelled out the nozzle by squeezing the bulb rapidly. This design has inherent limitations regarding the amount of pressure that one can achieve (fully dependent on the user's hand gripping strength) as well as the need to refill after each shot.

=== Piston/squirt gun ===
Many early small water guns used the same trigger based pumping mechanism used for spray bottles. In this type of device, the trigger actuates a positive displacement pump shaft. With the aid of two check valves, often using small ball bearings, fluid is drawn into the pump from a reservoir, then forced out the nozzle upon squeezing the trigger. The simplicity of the spraying mechanism allowed these toys to be manufactured cheaply, and allowed the majority of the body to be used as the reservoir. The primary limitation with this design is the volume of water that can be effectively moved per pump. Increasing pump volume would require more user effort to push the fluid out, making larger designs impractical. However, this technology remains widely used today both in spray bottles as well as small water guns that can be found in a wide variety of shapes and colors.

A piston pumper is another version of this system. They are generally bigger than squirt guns and spray bottles. Piston pumpers do not have triggers. Instead, they fire by moving the pump back and forth. Although the piston pumper has greater output than squirt guns, they tend to be less powerful than pressurized water guns.

=== Syringe/piston ===
Another simple method employed is a syringe or piston type. In essence, the water gun is made up primarily (sometimes exclusively) of the pumping mechanism that comprises an outer pump shaft with an inner pump-rod and water-tight seal. This allows water to be drawn into the pump as the pump is extended, then forcibly ejected out as the pump is compressed. Stream performance is dependent on the user's strength. Some models, like the Super Soaker Power Soaker Jr. and Stream Machines draw in and expel water from their nozzles. This design requires a bucket-type filling source. Other models, like the Super Soaker Power Soaker Mighty Cannon and Water Warriors Steady Stream, have check valves and a reservoir for portability.

=== Motorized small piston ===
During the 1980s, the motorized water gun was perhaps at its most prolific. Companies such as Entertech and Larami created water guns modeled after guns popularized in movies such as Rambo. At the heart of these devices was a small motor and crankshaft that converted a rotary motion into a forward-backward pumping motion to drive a small pump akin to those found in the small spray bottle-type squirt pistols. Stream performance was often not improved, but the motor removed the need to pump, which made the toys popular. The greatest fallbacks were that they wore out batteries quickly and that many trigger action blasters could outdo them, making motorized blasters the lowest class. However, their main strength—and consequent reason for dismissal—was their realistic styling. After some of these realistic-shaped water guns caused accidental shootings by police, stricter rules regarding shapes and coloring of water guns were drafted in the United States.

=== Air pressurized reservoir ===
Comparison of simple (A), air pressurised reservoir (B), air separate pressure chamber (C) and Constant Pressure System (D) water guns: In (A), pushing the trigger (1) expels the cylinder's contents through the nozzle; releasing it refills it from the reservoir (2). In (B), pumping the piston (3) forces air into the reservoir (4), increasing its pressure; opening the valve (5) expels the reservoir's contents. In (C), pulling out the piston (6) draws in water from the unpressurised reservoir (7), whereas pushing it in pressurises the firing chamber (8); triggering the valve (9) expels the chamber's contents. In (D), the firing chamber is replaced with an elastic bladder (8a) which exerts more uniform pressure on the water.

The air pressurized reservoir was introduced by the Cosmic Liquidator but made famous by the Super Soaker brand of water guns. In this device, a pump is used to push air into a partially water-filled reservoir. The reservoir is otherwise air-tight, but it has one valve to let the incoming air in from the pump as well as a manually controlled valve operated by the user, commonly activated by pulling on a trigger. As more air is pumped in, the air in the reservoir is compressed, increasing in pressure; the water is under pressure by the now compressed air. Upon opening the nozzle valve, the water is pushed out through the nozzle as the pressurized air attempts to re-equilibrate with atmospheric pressure. This system allows pumping energy to be stored and used as needed. As well, unlike the methods noted above, this air pressure system allows production of a uniform, continuous stream of water.

The limitation of this design is the need for a large number of strokes to pressurize a larger reservoir. As well, poorly sealed reservoirs would render a water gun useless. Moreover, these water guns cannot be refilled unless emptied and depressurized. Opening a pressurized reservoir blaster while there is pressure remaining in the system can result in copious local water spray or even an unexpected launch of the water gun and/or reservoir out of one's hands.

=== Air separate pressure/firing chamber ===
The air-based separate pressure chamber or firing chamber system works on the same physical principle as the pressurized reservoir system, but instead of pressurizing the reservoir, a separate, fixed volume chamber is included on the water gun into which water is pumped, compressing the air inside. This technology was first used on the Super Soaker SS 100. This allows the reservoir to be removed/opened at any time for refilling since the reservoir is not pressurized. As well, the typically smaller size of the pressure chamber and the fact that water is typically pumped, as opposed to air, reduces the average number of pumps needed to achieve functional pressure. For improved performance, some users opt to pre-pressurize the firing chamber by pumping in air first. This increases the starting pressure within the chamber, thus increasing the overall average pressure experienced by the water when it is pumped into the pressure chamber.

=== Split air vs water pressure chamber ===
While air based, the split air vs water pressure chamber has a sliding plunger that separates the compressed air from the water. This technology has so far only been seen on the Water Warriors Aqua Master PreCharger Series. A button or lever is used to toggle whether the pump is priming/pre-pressurizing the pressure chamber with air or whether the pump is moving water into the pressure chamber. Akin to pre-pressurizing the Separate Pressure Chamber water guns, the split air/water pressure chamber takes this one step further by preventing the accidental, undesired release of the pre-pressurized air by keeping it separated from the water by a sliding piston divider. After all the water is expelled from the pressure chamber, the sliding piston prevents loss of the pressurized air, thus reducing the number of times the water gun must be pumped in order to achieve optimal firing pressure.

=== Rubber diaphragm/hydro power ===
"Hydro Power" is a term coined by Buzz Bee Toys, referring initially to their series of water guns that employed an elastic rubber bladder to pressurize water. Similar to the Larami Constant Pressure System (CPS), the rubber diaphragm system can be considered basically half of a CPS-pressure chamber. A sheet of elastic material (typically rubber) is clamped against a housing unit. Water is pumped into the chamber, expanding the bladder that pressurizes the water within. However, due to the shape of the bladder, its expansion is not as uniform as in the CPS system, thus it experiences more significant pressure dropoff as the pressure chamber empties. Spyra GmbH uses an elongated bladder in its water blasters which, in combination with a special valve, enables shooting short bursts of water providing the impression of water bullets. The cylindrical bladder shape allows the pressure to be kept constant.

=== Springs ===
Another means of pressurizing or propelling water used in some water guns is the use of metal springs. Though uncommon, there are blasters that utilize this technique. The Waterball series has a spring-based catapult mechanisms for launching balls of water out of its nozzle. The Water Warriors Steady Stream uses a spring-based mechanisms as a sort of water capacitor to allow this otherwise piston-based water gun to produce a constant stream of water so long as the user pumps quickly enough. Additionally, the Super Soaker Quick Blast employs a spring-based firing chamber to propel its stream forward.

=== Peristaltic pumps ===
Peristaltic pump systems have also been used in some water guns models, most notably the original Shield Blaster water guns by Mattel. In this system, a rotary pump is used to move rollers along a compressible piece of tubing. As the rollers move, they push water along the tubing. The force exerted by the pump is dependent both on the speed of rotation as well as the thickness of tubing used. True continuous streams cannot be produced since the physical presence of the rollers means there will be partial gaps in the flow. However, if pumping is done quickly enough, the end result is a virtually smooth stream.

=== Hybrid systems ===
There are also a number of water guns that employ a variety of pressurization systems to propel water.

== See also ==
- Water fight
- Water balloon
- Assassin
- Super Soaker
- Entertech
- Water Warfare (video game)
- Deluge gun
- Water cannon
