= List of WON-Enabled games =

The World Opponent Network (WON) operated in its original form, more or less, from 1996 until about 2001. WON then went through many changes until the last of the WON-based game servers shut down in 2008. See the main WON article for its complex history after 2000.

Graphic used to tag games as Won Enabled.

WON provided features for online game servers—primarily for multiplayer games—for matchmaking and chat. Games that used these features were tagged as "WON Enabled" in the WON downloads database. While this database ultimately included hundreds of titles regardless of WON capabilities, this is a list of only the WON-enabled titles (with some exceptions as noted below).

A sister feature of WON, called "WONswap," allowed for user-created DLC sharing. While many titles supported by WONswap were also WON enabled, this was not always the case and this list does not include WONswap-only titles. For example, StarCraft is not in this list because, even though it appeared on WONswap, the game itself was served by Battle.net instead of WON.

== Retail games ==
Most of these games used WON game servers to enable online multiplayer capabilities. A few, however, such as Shivers II, just used some of the other WON features such as chat (for chatting while playing solo) and puzzle sharing. This list also includes WON-enabled demos of retail games that were, essentially, free online multiplayer mini-games.

While chess.net for Windows (1999) is a retail game that was linked to from WON.net (eventually replacing/outlasting Power Chess), it is not included in the list below because there is no indication that any chess.net products were WON enabled.

Title	Release date	Developer(s)	Publisher	SIGS/WON launch date (Note: SIGS/WON Launch Date should be one of (in this preferred order, and cited if not the game release date): news announcing date of server launch (including open beta servers), SIGS/WON feature patch date, date (or date span) game appeared on SIGS/WON website (if known, and if the date span does not span the release date), game release date, or game executable date.)	SIGS/WON shut-down date	Online fate (Note: Online Fate is intended to indicate where the property owners officially took the online features of the game after WON, if anywhere (or, with leased web games, back to its "home" website). (Also, if a newer title in a franchise forced a retirement, that title is listed here.) This is intended to show only the first stop after WON and not the entire legacy of the game. (See the game's main article for legacy details.) Supporting the new platform was done by releasing a patch. While, yes, some of these games can technically still be played online with LAN-over-internet tools (such as Kali) or VPN, these technologies are exploiting the LAN features of the game and not the online features of the game and, thus, not relevant here.)
3-D Ultra Cool Pool	Aug 16, 1998	Jeff Tunnell Productions	Sierra Attractions	May 1999 – Oct 1999	Aug 16, 2007	Offline
3-D Ultra MiniGolf	Apr 15, 1997	Dynamix	Sierra On-Line	Aug 4, 1997		Offline
3-D Ultra MiniGolf Deluxe	Jul 1, 1998	Dynamix	Sierra Attractions	Jul 1, 1998		Offline
Alien vs Predator 2	Oct 22, 2001	Monolith Productions	Sierra On-Line	Oct 22, 2001	Nov 1, 2008	Offline (Note: Side note: AVP1 (but not AVP2) is on Steam with some Steam assistance for self-hosting multiplayer games.)
Arcanum: Of Steamworks & Magick Obscura	Aug 21, 2001	Troika Games	Sierra On-Line	Aug 21, 2001	Nov 1, 2008	Offline (Note: Single-player version on Steam.)
Birthright: The Gorgon's Alliance	Jul 31, 1997	Synergistic Software	Sierra On-Line	Sep 18, 1997		Offline
Caesar IV	Sep 26, 2006	Tilted Mill	Sierra Entertainment	Sep 26, 2006	Nov 1, 2008	Offline
Civil War Generals 2	Oct 20, 1997	Impressions Games	Sierra On-Line	Oct 20, 1997		Offline
Cyberstorm 2: Corporate Wars	Apr 14, 1998	Dynamix	Sierra On-Line	Apr 14, 1998		Offline
Cyberstorm 2: Corporate Wars	Jun 4, 1998	Dynamix	Dynamix	Jun 4, 1998		Offline
Dark Reign 2	Jun 30, 2000	Pandemic Studios	Activision	Jun 20, 2000	Nov 1, 2008	Offline
Day of Defeat	May 6, 2003	Valve	Activision	May 6, 2003	Jul 31, 2004	Steam
Edgar Torronteras' eXtreme Biker	Oct 21, 1999	Deibus Studios	Sierra On-Line	Nov 1999 – Jan 2000		Offline
Emperor: Rise of the Middle Kingdom	Sep 9, 2002	Impressions Games, BreakAway Games	Sierra Entertainment	Sep 9, 2002	Nov 1, 2008	Offline
Empire Earth	Nov 13, 2001	Stainless Steel Studios	Sierra On-Line	Sep 21, 2001	Nov 1, 2008	Offline
Empire Earth 2	Apr 26, 2005	Mad Doc Software	Sierra Entertainment	Apr 26, 2005	Nov 1, 2008	Offline
Empire Earth: The Art of Conquest	Sep 17, 2002	Mad Doc Software	Sierra Entertainment	Aug 5, 2002	Nov 1, 2008	Offline
Field & Stream: Trophy Bass 3D	Jun 16, 1999	Dynamix	Sierra Sports	Jun 16, 1999	Aug 16, 2007	Offline
Field & Stream: Trophy Bass 4	May 25, 2000	Dynamix	Sierra Sports	May 25, 2000	Aug 16, 2007	Offline
Field & Stream: Trophy Bass 5 (Note: F&S Trophy Bass 5 does not exist and appears to be a mistake in the shut-down notice, which likely meant to list Trophy Bass 3D instead.*)					Aug 16, 2007	Offline
Field & Stream: Trophy Bear Hunting	1999	Dynamix	Sierra Sports	May 2000 – Jun 2000		Offline
Field & Stream: Trophy Big Game Hunting	Apr 26, 2000	Dynamix	Sierra Sports	May 2000 – Jun 2000		Offline
Field & Stream: Trophy Buck	1999	Dynamix	Sierra Sports	Feb 1998 – Feb 1999		Offline
Field & Stream: Trophy Hunting	1999	Dynamix	Sierra Sports	May 2000 – Jun 2000		Offline
Field & Stream: Trophy Hunting 4	Sep 21, 2000	Dynamix	Sierra Sports	Sep 21, 2000	Aug 16, 2007	Offline
Field & Stream: Trophy Hunting 5	Jun 21, 2001	Dynamix	Sierra On-Line	Jun 21, 2001	Aug 16, 2007	Offline
Front Page Sports: Football Pro '97	Dec 1996	Synergistic Software, Dynamix	Sierra On-Line	Dec 1996		Offline
Front Page Sports: Football Pro '98	Nov 3, 1997	Synergistic Software	Sierra On-Line	Nov 3, 1997		Offline
Front Page Sports: Golf	Apr 30, 1997	Headgate Studios	Sierra On-Line	Apr 30, 1997		Offline
Front Page Sports: Golf, 1998 Edition	Sep 24, 1997	Headgate Studios	Sierra Sports	Sep 24, 1997		Offline
Golf Pro '98	Sep 24, 1997	Headgate Studios	Sierra Sports	Sep 24, 1997		Offline
Front Page Sports: Trophy Bass 2	Sep 30, 1996	Dynamix	Sierra On-Line	Nov 1996		TB 3D
Front Page Sports: Trophy Bass 2: Northern Lakes	Mar 13, 1997	Dynamix	Sierra On-Line	Mar 13, 1997		TB 3D
Front Page Sports: Trophy Rivers	Nov 30, 1997	Dynamix	Sierra On-Line	Nov 30, 1997		TB 3D
Ground Control	Jun 1, 2000	Massive Entertainment	Sierra Studios	Apr 2000 – May 2000	Nov 1, 2008	Offline
Ground Control 2: Operation Exodus	Jun 18, 2004	Massive Entertainment	Sierra Entertainment	Jun 18, 2004	Nov 1, 2008	Offline
Half-Life	Nov 19, 1998	Valve	Sierra Studios	Nov 19, 1998	Jul 31, 2004	Steam
Half-Life: Counter-Strike	Nov 9, 2000	Valve	Sierra Studios	Nov 9, 2000	Jul 31, 2004	Steam
Half-Life: Opposing Force	Nov 18, 1999	Valve, Gearbox Software	Sierra Studios	Nov 18, 1999	Jul 31, 2004	Steam
Homeworld	Sep 28, 1999	Relic Entertainment	Sierra Studios	Sep 28, 1999	Nov 1, 2008	Offline
Homeworld: Cataclysm	Sep 1, 2000	Barking Dog Studios	Sierra Studios	Sep 1, 2000	Nov 1, 2008	Offline
Interstate '82	Nov 22, 1999	Activision	Activision	Nov 22, 1999		Offline
Jazz Jackrabbit 2	May 7, 1998	Epic MegaGames	Gathering of Developers	May 7, 1998		Offline
Leisure Suit Larry's Casino	Jul 17, 1998	Sierra On-Line	Sierra On-Line	Jun 10, 1998		Offline
Leisure Suit Larry's Casino demo	Jun 10, 1998	Sierra On-Line	Sierra On-Line	Jun 10, 1998		Offline
Lords of Magic	Nov 19, 1997	Impressions Games	Sierra On-Line	Dec 1997	Aug 16, 2007	Offline
Lords of the Realm II: Siege Pack	Jun 13, 1997	Impressions Games	Sierra On-Line	Jun 13, 1997		Offline
MissionForce: CyberStorm	Jun 12, 1996	Dynamix	Sierra On-Line	Dec 21, 1996		Offline
NASCAR Legends	Nov 11, 1999	Papyrus	Sierra Sports	Nov 11, 1999	Aug 16, 2007	Offline
NASCAR Racing 2002 Season	Feb 14, 2002	Papyrus	Sierra Entertainment	Feb 14, 2002	Aug 16, 2007	Offline
NASCAR Racing 2003 Season	Feb 14, 2003	Papyrus	Sierra Entertainment	Feb 14, 2003	Aug 16, 2007	Offline
NASCAR Racing 3	Oct 12, 1999	Papyrus	Sierra Sports	Oct 12, 1999	Aug 16, 2007	Offline
NASCAR Racing 3 demo	Oct 12, 1999	Papyrus	Sierra Sports	Oct 12, 1999	Aug 16, 2007	Offline
NASCAR Racing 3: NASCAR Craftsman Truck Series	2000	Papyrus	Sierra Sports	2000	Aug 16, 2007	Offline
NASCAR Racing 4	Feb 6, 2001	Papyrus	Sierra On-Line	Feb 6, 2001	Aug 16, 2007	Offline
NASCAR Racing Online Series (Note: Pay-to-play game.) (Note: There is no evidence that the NROS extension to NASCAR Racing 2 was ever WON enabled to any degree (even though Papyrus did modify NASCAR Racing 2 to be client-server based for the project).^{†} Rather, TEN-based games were VPN-based with proprietary tech by TEN and Concentric Network Corporation.^{‡} NROS is included here because WON.net linked NROS.com as one of their hosted sites.**)	Nov 12, 1997	Papyrus	TEN	Nov 12, 1997	Oct 14, 1999	N3
NASCAR Racing Online Series demo	May 4, 1999	Papyrus	TEN	May 4, 1999	Oct 14, 1999	N3
NFL Football Pro '99	Dec 22, 1998	Sierra On-Line	Sierra Sports	Dec 22, 1998	Jan 21, 1999	Offline
No One Lives Forever 2: A Spy in H.A.R.M.'s Way	Oct 1, 2002	Monolith Productions	Sierra Entertainment	Oct 1, 2002	Nov 1, 2008	Offline
Outpost 2: Divided Destiny	Aug 25, 1997	Dynamix	Sierra On-Line	Aug 25, 1997		Offline
PGA Championship Golf 2000	Jun 2000	Headgate Studios	Sierra Sports	Jun 2000	Aug 16, 2007	Offline
PGA Championship Golf, 1999 Edition	Jun 1, 1999	Headgate Studios	Sierra Sports	Jun 2, 1999		Offline
Police Quest: SWAT 2	Jul 11, 1998	Yosemite Entertainment	Sierra FX	Jul 11, 1998		Offline
Power Chess	Sep 30, 1996	Sierra On-Line	Sierra On-Line	Dec 1996		Offline
Power Chess 98	Nov 3, 1997	Sierra On-Line	Sierra On-Line	Nov 3, 1997		Offline
Power Chess 2.0	1998	Sierra On-Line	Sierra Attractions	Sep 1998 – Dec 1998		Offline
Sierra's Complete Chess	1998	Sierra On-Line	Sierra Attractions	Feb 1998 – Feb 1999		Offline
Professional Bull Rider	Oct 27, 1999	Sierra On-Line	Sierra Sports	Jan 2000 – Mar 2000		Offline
Professional Bull Rider 2	Sep 30, 2000	Sierra On-Line	Sierra Sports	Sep 30, 2000	Aug 16, 2007	Offline
Quake II	Dec 9, 1997	id Software	Activision	Feb 1998 – Feb 1999		Steam
Red Baron II	Dec 16, 1997	Dynamix	Sierra On-Line	Dec 16, 1997	Nov 1, 2008	Offline
Red Baron 3D	Oct 29, 1998	Dynamix	Dynamix	Oct 29, 1998	Nov 1, 2008	Offline
Sanity: Aiken's Artifact	Sep 26, 2000	Monolith Productions	Fox Interactive	Sep 26, 2000	Nov 1, 2008	Offline
Shivers II: Harvest of Souls (Note: Single-player game that used WON for chat.) (Note: Single-player game that used WON for puzzle swapping.)	Apr 14, 1997	Sierra On-Line	Sierra On-Line	Apr 14, 1997		Offline
Soldier of Fortune	Mar 28, 2000	Raven Software	Activision	Mar 28, 2000	Jul 31, 2001	GameSpy
Speed Busters: American Highways	Nov 23, 1998	Ubi Soft	Ubi Soft	May 3, 1999		Offline
Star Trek: Armada	Mar 27, 2000	Activision	Activision	Mar 27, 2000	Nov 1, 2008	Offline
Star Trek: Starfleet Command II: Empires at War	Dec 12, 2000	Taldren	Interplay Entertainment	Dec 12, 2000		Offline
Starsiege	Mar 18, 1999	Dynamix	Dynamix	Mar 18, 1999	May 12, 2004	Offline
Starsiege: Tribes	Dec 23, 1998	Dynamix	Dynamix	Dec 23, 1998	Aug 16, 2007	Offline
SWAT 3: Close Quarters Battle: Elite Edition	Oct 6, 2000	Sierra Northwest	Sierra Studios	Oct 6, 2000	Nov 1, 2008	Offline
SWAT 3: Close Quarters Battle: Elite Edition demo	Dec 14, 2000	Sierra Northwest	Sierra Studios	Dec 14, 2000	Aug 16, 2007	Offline
SWAT 3: Tactical Game of the Year Edition	Oct 10, 2001	Sierra Northwest	Sierra Studios	Oct 10, 2001	Nov 1, 2008	Offline
Team Fortress Classic	Apr 7, 1999	Valve	Sierra Studios	Apr 7, 1999	Jul 31, 2004	Steam
The Incredible Machine: Even More Contraptions	2001	Jeff Tunnell Productions	Sierra On-Line	2001	Nov 1, 2008	Offline
The Time Warp of Dr. Brain	Jun 1, 1996	Sierra On-Line	Sierra On-Line	Dec 1996 – Feb 1997		Offline
Throne of Darkness	Sep 25, 2001	Click Entertainment	Sierra On-Line	Sep 25, 2001	Aug 16, 2007	Offline
Tribes 2	Mar 29, 2001	Dynamix	Sierra Studios	Mar 29, 2001	Nov 1, 2008	Offline
Unreal	May 22, 1998	Epic MegaGames	GT Interactive	May 22, 1998	May 2000 – Jun 2000	UT
Unreal Tournament	Nov 22, 1999	Epic Games, Digital Extremes	GT Interactive	Nov 22, 1999		Offline
Vampire: The Masquerade: Redemption	Jun 7, 2000	Nihilistic Software	Activision	Mar 2000 – Apr 2000	Nov 1, 2008	Offline
YOU DON'T KNOW JACK: 5th Dementia	Oct 30, 2000	Jellyvision	Sierra Attractions	Oct 30, 2000	Aug 16, 2007	Offline

Nested references from notes above: * † ‡ **

=== Announced retail games ===
Games announced as coming to WON.net but never appeared.

- Front Page Sports: Ski Racing (1997) Sierra On-Line
- Skiing, 1999 Edition (1998) Sierra Sports
- Shanghai: Dynasty (1997) Activision
- Shanghai: Second Dynasty (1999) Activision
- Heavy Gear II (1999) Activision

== Free games ==
This is a list of all free/ad-supported, browser-based/download-on-demand games that were featured on WON.net. Some are WON enabled (such as ARC and Silencer); some not (such as the single-player "Quick Games"); some difficult to tell after the fact. Hence, all free games are included here as the list is not very long.

The PrizeCentral.com games are not listed here (which could be the topic of its own list). Likewise, games that appeared after the breakup of WON.net into Flipside.com and, later, UPROAR.com also are not listed here. These games came with the acquisition of WON.net by Havas (who had also acquired PrizeCentral.com and other properties). It is not known that any of these later Havas-acquired games are WON enabled.

The instant messaging games are not included here (which appeared in download.won.net in Sep 2000, and later on Flipside.com). Even though some like IM Backgammon are tagged as WON Enabled in the downloads database, they are built upon ICQ and not WON (and have no known WON components).

Title	Release date	Developer(s)	Publisher	SIGS/WON launch date	SIGS/WON shut-down date	Online fate
Absolute Zero (Note: Requires a Java-enabled browser.)	Apr 2, 1998	Eye One	Eye One	Mar 11, 1999		Offline
Acrophobia	Dec 1997	Berkeley Systems	Berzerk.com	Oct 1997		Offline
Roof Rats (Note: Free adaption of a retail game (not a demo).) (Note: Requires Macromedia Shockwave Player.)	Oct 29, 1998	Berkeley Systems	Sierra Attractions	Nov 1999 – Feb 2000		Offline
Any Given Sunday Trivia Challenge	1999	Jellyvision	WON.net	Nov 1999 – Feb 2000	May 10, 2000	Offline
ARC	1995	Hoopy Entertainment	Hoopy Entertainment	Feb 28, 2000	Aug 16, 2007	Offline
Austin Powers: Operation: Trivia	1999	Berkeley Systems	Sierra Attractions	May 1999 – Oct 1999	Mar 2000 – May 2000	Offline
Burning Metal	Mar 27, 1998	Eye One	Eye One	Mar 11, 1999	2000	Home
chess.net for Java	1996	Eplay Network	chess.net	Mar 11, 1999	Jun 2000 – Aug 2000	Home
Cosmic Consensus	May 17, 1999	Berkeley Systems, Electronic Hollywood	Berzerk.com	May 1999 – Jun 1999		Home
Roach Invaders	1999	Electronic Hollywood	WON.net	Mar 11, 1999	2000	Home
Loco	1999	Electronic Hollywood	WON.net	Feb 1999 – May 1999	Nov 1999 – Feb 2000	Home
Get the Picture?	Jun 8, 1999	Berkeley Systems	WON.net	Jun 4, 1999		Offline
Manic Media (Note: Requires RealPlayer.)	Mar 1997	EPG Multimedia	LAUNCH Media	Feb 1999 – May 1999	May 1999 – Oct 1999	Offline
S.P.I.T.E.	Sep 1998	EPG Studios	LAUNCH Media	Mar 29, 1999	Dec 1999	Gameplay
Silencer	beta only	Mind Control Software	WON.net	Nov 1999 – Feb 2000	Oct 2000	Offline
SnowCraft	Dec 1998	Nicholson NY	Nicholson NY	Feb 1999 – May 1999		Home
SpiritWars (Note: Both free and pay-to-play.)	Jun 8, 1999	Kellogg Creek Software	WON.net	Dec 20, 1998	Jun 17, 2000	Home
Stock Market Challenge	1995	Sierra On-Line	Sierra On-Line	1995	Feb 1997 – Apr 1997	Offline
The Cypher	Jul 1995	EPG Multimedia	LAUNCH Media	Oct 31, 1998	Dec 1999	Gameplay
Trivia Blitz	1997	E-Pub	UPROAR.com	Jul 13, 1998	Jul 1998 – Feb 1999	Home
What's the Big Idea?	1998	Berkeley Systems	Berzerk.com	Dec 14, 1998	May 1999 – Jun 1999	Offline
Wordox (Note: Became part of the Hoyle series.)	Jul 1, 1999	WON.net	WON.net	Jul 1, 1999		Offline
YOU DON’T KNOW JACK Sports the netshow	Feb 1997	Berkeley Systems, Jellyvision	Berzerk.com	Nov 11, 1998		Offline
YOU DON’T KNOW JACK the netshow	Dec 1996	Berkeley Systems, Jellyvision	Berzerk.com	Nov 11, 1998		YDKJ Offline

== Hoyle retail games and Hoyle Channel ==
The Hoyle series of games evolved from retail to free on WON and, as such, are difficult to classify in the other lists here. Hoyle retail games started much like all the other retail games here until it was announced that the servers for the retail and demo versions would be shut down in favor of the new free versions. The new free versions were dubbed the "Hoyle Channel." It was also announced that future Hoyle retail games would work with the Hoyle Channel for online play--only with more features (such as choices for backgrounds and card graphics) plus the usual array of offline features and games. Thus, here is a detailed list of the retail releases, plus a simple list of the free games (due to version evolution of the free games being unknown, and staying in sync with the retail releases anyhow).

For the most part, bundles are not included in the list, but a-la-carte splits (Hoyle Bridge being a split from Hoyle Card Games for example) are included.

Title	Release date	Developer(s)	Publisher	SIGS/WON launch date	SIGS/WON shut-down date	Online fate
Hoyle Battling Ships and War	Feb 1, 1998	Sierra On-Line	Sierra On-Line	Feb 1, 1998		Offline
Hoyle Blackjack	Jun 30, 1996	Sierra On-Line	Sierra On-Line	Oct 4, 1996	Feb 29, 2000	Hoyle Channel
Hoyle Board Games	Sep 1, 1998	Sierra On-Line	Sierra Attractions	Sep 1, 1998	Feb 29, 2000	Hoyle Channel
Hoyle Board Games	Sep 21, 1999	Sierra On-Line	Sierra Attractions	Sep 21, 1999		Offline
Hoyle Board Games	Oct 3, 2000	Sierra On-Line	Sierra Attractions	Oct 3, 2000		Offline
Hoyle Board Games	Sep 25, 2001	Sierra On-Line	Sierra Entertainment	Sep 25, 2001		Offline
Hoyle Board Games	Sep 7, 2002	Sierra Entertainment	Vivendi	Sep 7, 2002		Offline
Hoyle Board Games demo (Note: a.k.a. Hoyle Board Games Internet Play)	Nov 24, 1998	Sierra On-Line	Sierra Attractions	Nov 24, 1998	Feb 29, 2000	Hoyle Channel
Hoyle Bridge	Aug 25, 2000	Sierra On-Line	Sierra Attractions	Aug 25, 2000		Offline
Hoyle Bridge & Euchre	Feb 1, 1998	Sierra On-Line	Sierra Attractions	Feb 1, 1998	Feb 29, 2000	Hoyle Channel
Hoyle Card Games	Sep 1, 1998	Sierra On-Line	Sierra Attractions	Sep 1, 1998	Feb 29, 2000	Hoyle Channel
Hoyle Card Games	Sep 21, 1999	Sierra On-Line	Sierra Attractions	Sep 21, 1999		Offline
Hoyle Card Games	Oct 3, 2000	Sierra On-Line	Sierra Attractions	Oct 3, 2000		Offline
Hoyle Card Games	Sep 25, 2001	Sierra On-Line	Sierra Entertainment	Sep 25, 2001		Offline
Hoyle Card Games	Sep 7, 2002	Sierra Entertainment	Vivendi	Sep 7, 2002		Offline
Hoyle Card Games	Sep 2, 2003	Sierra Entertainment	Vivendi	Sep 2, 2003		Offline
Hoyle Card Games demo (Note: a.k.a. Hoyle Card Games Internet Play)	Nov 24, 1998	Sierra On-Line	Sierra Attractions	Nov 24, 1998	Feb 29, 2000	Hoyle Channel
Hoyle Casino	Oct 1, 1996	Sierra On-Line	Sierra On-Line	Dec 1996	Feb 29, 2000	Hoyle Channel
Hoyle Casino	Nov 28, 1997	Sierra On-Line	Sierra On-Line	Nov 28, 1997	Feb 29, 2000	Hoyle Channel
Hoyle Casino	Oct 1, 1998	Sierra On-Line	Sierra Attractions	Oct 1, 1998	Feb 29, 2000	Hoyle Channel
Hoyle Casino	Sep 20, 1999	Sierra On-Line	Sierra Attractions	Sep 20, 1999		Offline
Hoyle Casino	Oct 3, 2000	Sierra On-Line	Sierra Attractions	Oct 3, 2000		Offline
Hoyle Casino	Sep 25, 2001	Sierra On-Line	Sierra Entertainment	Sep 25, 2001		Offline
Hoyle Casino	Sep 7, 2002	Sierra Entertainment	Vivendi	Sep 7, 2002		Offline
Hoyle Casino	Sep 2, 2003	Sierra Entertainment	Vivendi	Sep 2, 2003		Offline
Hoyle Casino demo (Note: a.k.a. Hoyle Internet Casino)	Nov 13, 1998	Sierra On-Line	Sierra Attractions	Nov 13, 1998	Feb 29, 2000	Hoyle Channel
Hoyle Classic Backgammon & Cribbage	Mar 15, 1999	Sierra On-Line	Sierra Attractions	Mar 15, 1999	Feb 29, 2000	Hoyle Channel
Hoyle Classic Board Games	Nov 30, 1997	Sierra On-Line	Sierra On-Line	Nov 30, 1997	Feb 29, 2000	Hoyle Channel
Hoyle Classic Board Games demo	Oct 9, 1997	Sierra On-Line	Sierra On-Line	Jun 16, 1998	Feb 29, 2000	Hoyle Channel
Hoyle Classic Card Games	Nov 30, 1997	Sierra On-Line	Sierra On-Line	Nov 30, 1997	Feb 29, 2000	Hoyle Channel
Hoyle Classic Card Games demo	Sep 27, 1997	Sierra On-Line	Sierra On-Line	Jun 16, 1998	Feb 29, 2000	Hoyle Channel
Hoyle Craps and Blackjack	1999	Sierra On-Line	Sierra Attractions	1999	Feb 29, 2000	Hoyle Channel
Hoyle Poker (Note: Hoyle Poker (1997) was re-released under various names including Hoyle Classic: Poker (1998), Hoyle Poker (2000), and Hoyle Friday Night Poker (2003). It has not yet been shown that the game was updated between any of these releases.*)	Apr 14, 1997	Sierra On-Line	Sierra On-Line	Apr 14, 1997	Feb 29, 2000	Hoyle Channel
Hoyle Poker demo (Note: a.k.a. SIGS version of Hoyle Poker)	Jul 24, 1997	Sierra On-Line	Sierra On-Line	Jul 24, 1997	Feb 29, 2000	Hoyle Channel
Hoyle Poker demo (Note: a.k.a. Holye Internet Poker 3)	Jul 23, 1998	Sierra On-Line	Sierra On-Line	Jul 23, 1998	Feb 29, 2000	Hoyle Channel
Hoyle Word Games	Oct 13, 1999	Sierra On-Line	Sierra Attractions	Oct 13, 1999		Offline
Hoyle Word Games	Oct 3, 2000	Sierra On-Line	Sierra Attractions	Oct 3, 2000		Offline
Hoyle Word Games	Sep 1, 2001	Sierra On-Line	Sierra Attractions	Sep 1, 2001		Offline

Nested reference from notes above: *

=== Hoyle Channel games ===
- Blackjack (Jul 1999)
- Poker (Jul 1999)
- Spades (Jul 1999)
- Hearts (Jul 1999)
- Backgammon (Jul 1999)
- Checkers (Jul 1999)
- Chess (Jul 1999)
- Reversi (Jul 1999)
- Pachisi (Jul 16, 1999)
- Cribbage (Jul 16, 1999)
- Gin (Jul 28, 1999)
- Yacht (Jul 28, 1999)
- Euchre (Aug 12, 1999)
- Crosswords (Aug 12, 1999)
- Pinochle (Jul 1, 1999)
- Word Searches (Jul 1, 1999)
- Hangman (Sep 24, 1999)
- Bridge (Sep 24, 1999)
- Roulette (Sep 24, 1999)
- Dominoes (Oct 13, 1999)
- Word Yacht (Oct 13, 1999)
- DoubleCross (Oct 1999 – Nov 1999)
- Wordox (Oct 1999 – Nov 1999)
- Craps (Nov 1999 – Jan 2000)
