= Dark Sun Online: Crimson Sands =

1996 video game

- Cover art by Gerald Brom
- Developer: Strategic Simulations
- Publishers: Strategic Simulations; Total Entertainment Network
- Platform: Windows 95
- Release: October 2, 1996
- Genre: Massively multiplayer online role-playing game
- Mode: Multiplayer

Dark Sun Online: Crimson Sands was a massively multiplayer online role-playing game (MMORPG) developed and published by Strategic Simulations in 1996 for Windows 95. Dark Sun Online was based on the licensed Dark Sun campaign setting for the Advanced Dungeons & Dragons tabletop role-playing game. It was one of the first fully graphical MMORPGs.

Dark Sun Online was one of the first fully graphical MMORPGs to feature a number of features popularized by later games like Ultima Online. Due to the game's peer-to-peer structure, the game was susceptible to hacking by its players. Dark Sun Online closed in 1999.

== History ==
In the summer of 1994, representatives of AT&T's Interchange network pitched the idea of an advanced Dungeons & Dragons online game to Strategic Simulations, Inc. (SSI). AT&T was in the process of launching an online network, and wanted a strong game presence to help the network launch, based on the success of Neverwinter Nights on America Online. The Dark Sun Online project was led by Andre Vrignaud. Development was troubled; Andrew Park of GameSpot noted that Dark Sun Online "suffered from a lack of funds and time from the beginning". It had only one part-time artist. Many of the game's assets, including its sections of code, were reused from Dark Sun: Shattered Lands and Dark Sun: Wake of the Ravager. Sprites and sounds were also borrowed from Al-Qadim: The Genie's Curse, and from World of Aden: Thunderscape, which was also under development at the time. The team modified the codebase of Dark Sun: Wake of the Ravager to serve as a multiplayer client, which complicated software development during the process. The team continued development on the project after AT&T closed the network that SSI was slotted to release the game on in 1996. The game was shopped to other companies, and picked up by Total Entertainment Network (TEN). The deal with TEN was made public in April 1996.

TEN released the game on its service on October 2, 1996, after two years of production. It was one of the first games in SSI's "Online Only" brand, alongside Panzer General Online Only. Members of the Total Entertainment Network, later Pogo.com, had exclusive access to the game. According to GameSpy, the game had many of the features that would help make the game Ultima Online successful, which was released a year after Dark Sun's launch.

The game was vulnerable to hacking and cheating, with the code proving "ripe for manipulation" by users within weeks of its launch. As the game relied on a peer-to-peer networking system, game logic became dependent on users' computers instead of the host, leaving the game exceptionally vulnerable to hacking. Hackers "quickly learned to alter and improve player abilities at a moment's notice". Hackers were at a great advantage in the game to other players, an issue SSI had difficulty solving. In April 1997, Strategic Simulations released a major update for Dark Sun Online that separated the game into "Law" and "Chaos" regions, in reaction to trends of player behavior. The former favored player-versus-environment collaboration, with light player-versus-player elements; TEN characterized the latter as "a hostile world in which trusted allies are extremely valuable and equally scarce". As of October 24 the same year, the development team reported that the game was generating "tens of thousands of hours of paid use every month".

Dark Sun Online reached version 2.0 in December 1997. In July 1998, TEN "completed" Dark Sun Online with the release of version 2.5, which the game's producer said would be a "stable, consistent environment, free of troublemakers and full of events".

=== Shutdown ===
The game "quietly" shut down in 1999. According to Massively, "while ultimately unsuccessful in achieving its potential or gaining a large audience, Dark Sun Online: Crimson Sands made a valiant attempt at achieving the inevitable future of gaming".

== Gameplay ==
The game was set in the desert world of Athas. Like many modern MMOs, it had "classes, guilds, chat windows, grouping, levels, death penalties". Characters could be built from eight races and eight classes, with the choice of an alignment limited by their class. There was also the option to multi-class under certain conditions.

On Athas, PvP is usually possible in most locations except for safe zones. Death results in players losing some equipment and a full level, with a total of 15 levels in the game. The game generated random quests for players. Developers would use the social aspect of the game to schedule roleplaying activities, and could also generate live events using the chat system. Developers encouraged roleplaying through the chat as well, with players of all locations able to communicate.

== Reception ==
Reception

Review scores
| Publication | Score |
|---|---|
| PC Player | 3/5 |
| CNET Gamecenter | 2/5 |

According to Total Entertainment Network, Dark Sun Online was the service's second-most-played title of 1997, and had garnered "close to one million player hours" from 1996 through December 1997.

Allen Rausch of GameSpy argued that Dark Sun Online was "a well-intentioned experiment from SSI that just never got off the ground the way it could have".

== Legacy ==
In 2000, Brett Robinson of PC PowerPlay characterized Dark Sun Online as part of "the first generation of MMORPGs", alongside titles such as The Realm and Meridian 59. He argued, "with overly simple graphics and gameplay mechanics, these died quickly, and paved the way to the more successful second generation", which included games like Ultima Online and EverQuest.

In December 1997, Total Entertainment Network announced a follow-up to Dark Sun Online entitled Dark Sun Online: The Age of Heroes, but the project was never made.
