= PGA Championship Golf 1999 Edition =

1999 video game

- Developer: Headgate Studios
- Publisher: Sierra Sports
- Director: Vance Cook
- Producer: Mike Jacob
- Composer: Chuck Barth
- Platform: Microsoft Windows
- Release: NA: June 1, 1999
- Genre: Sports
- Modes: Single-player; Multiplayer

PGA Championship Golf 1999 Edition is a 1999 golf video game developed by Headgate Studios and published by Sierra Sports for Microsoft Windows. The game includes eight golf courses and a golf swing method known as TrueSwing, which uses the movement of the computer mouse to simulate a golf swing in real-time as the player makes the shot. Also included is the ReadyPlay feature, allowing golfers in a multiplayer group to play at their own pace without waiting for others to finish their turn. The game was praised for its variety, including its TrueSwing and ReadyPlay features, although its golf commentary was criticized. The game was followed by a sequel, PGA Championship Golf 2000.

== Gameplay ==
PGA Championship Golf 1999 Edition includes seven real-life courses: Black Diamond Ranch, Coeur d'Alene Resort, Pasatiempo, Pete Dye Golf Club, Prince Course, Royal Birkdale, and Sahalee Country Club. A fictional eighth course, Jocassee Shoals, is also featured. The real courses each start with a short film which serves as an overview of the course. The Course Architect is a feature that allows the player to create custom golf courses, with options that include hills, valleys, trees, and sound effects.

PGA Championship Golf 1999 Edition features 12 game modes, including four-ball, match, scramble, and skins. A practice mode is also featured. The game includes professional golfer Tom Lehman and several default golfers as playable characters. Additional golfers can be custom-made by the player, with selectable options such as gender, skin tone, hair, and hats. Computer-controlled golfers can be set to gradually learn from the actual player's golfing and thus become more challenging for the player. The player can choose to let a caddie select the golf clubs, and candies can also track the statistics of the player's shots to gradually learn which clubs work best in certain scenarios. Rather than using an aim mechanism, the player must rotate the golfer's position to aim for the hole. The game includes a traditional three-click golf swing method, as well as the TrueSwing method, which uses the movement of the computer mouse to simulate the golf swing in real-time as the player makes the shot. On the green, the player can use a ground-based grid to aid with putting. The player can also make use of mulligans and gimmes, and can select post-shot animations, such as falling to the ground in frustration at a poor shot. The game features golf commentary by Mark Lye and Grant Boone. Various camera angles are featured as well.

Multiplayer options include modem and LAN, and WON.net was also an option at the time of release. The ReadyPlay feature allows each golfer in a multiplayer group to play at their own pace, rather than waiting for each golfer to finish their turn.

== Development and release ==
In July 1998, Sierra Sports announced an agreement with PGA Interactive to create PGA Championship Golf 1999 Edition, scheduled for release that October. The game was developed by Headgate Studios. The game's director was Vance Cook, who also served as a designer and software engineer. Cook, who founded Headgate Studios, had previously worked on the Links golf games and Sierra's Front Page Sports: Golf.

To replicate the courses, Cook and his team would survey each real course, then they would fly an airplane 1,000 to 2,000 feet above the course and take aerial photographs. The survey data and photographs were then put through the process of photogrammetry. Following that, a photographer would visit the courses to take pictures of trees, bushes, ground textures, and the clubhouses. The pictures were then taken to Headgate's office in Salt Lake City, Utah, where the courses were created. Each course took three to four months to complete, with a team of three or four people. The Jocassee Shoals course was created using the Course Architect. The golfers consist of 400 animated motions and are made of up to 20,000 polygons. The game's TrueSwing was previously featured in Front Page Sports: Golf, and was enhanced for PGA Championship Golf 1999 Edition.

On May 20, 1999, Sierra Sports announced the completion of the game. In North America, copies of PGA Championship Golf 1999 Edition began shipping in late May 1999, and were expected to be on sale by June 1. The game was released for Microsoft Windows. The Sierra Sports Golf Association, a sports league created by WON.net, hosted various online golf events for players of the game. In addition, players using the Course Architect would post their custom-made courses online to share with others. As of July 1999, more than 35 custom courses had been posted on WON.net. By September 1999, the game had been released in the United Kingdom. By August 2000, the game had been re-released in the U.K as part of the Sierra Originals budget label.

== Reception ==
Reception

Aggregate score
Aggregator	Score
GameRankings	80%

Review scores
Publication	Score
AllGame	4/5
CNET Gamecenter	7/10
Computer Games Strategy Plus	3.5/5
Computer Gaming World	3/5
Eurogamer	8/10
GamePro	4.5/5 (Note: GamePro gave the game 4/5 for graphics, 3/5 for sound, and two 4.5/5 scores for control and overall fun factor.)
GameSpot	8.5/10
IGN	7.6/10
PC Accelerator	7/10
PC Gamer (UK)	73%
PC Gamer (US)	90%
PC Zone	82%
Hartford Courant	8.2/10
Sports Gaming Network	90/100
USA Today	2/4

The game received favorable reviews according to the review aggregation website GameRankings.

Some critics considered the gameplay inferior to the Links, Jack Nicklaus, and PGA Tour series, although Ewan MacDonald of Eurogamer preferred it over the Links series and considered it one of the better golf games available. Mike Snider of USA Today called the game "intriguing, but not of championship stature." William Abner of Computer Games Strategy Plus called the game "an enigma," writing, "It has the best swing method in the industry, a powerful course designer, addictive gameplay, and yet it feels unfinished." Brett Todd of Computer Gaming World considered it a forgettable game.

The graphics received some praise, although they were also considered inferior to the Links and Jack Nicklaus games. Macdonald called the game a "strange hybrid" of 3D and 2D graphics. Gordon Goble of CNET Gamecenter considered the graphics realistic but stated that they had a "dull, almost drab look" that was lacking in color. Todd considered the courses to be "nicely drawn, but plain," and criticized their similarities to each other, as did Paul Rosano of Hartford Courant. Martin Korda of PC Zone called the graphics "smooth, if not spectacular, although it's a shame that the crowd are so static; they can also stand right in front of your golfer when he takes a shot, which is a little sloppy." Chris Buxton of PC Gamer (U.K.) criticized the stagnant and "awful-looking" spectators, while Abner wrote that they "are never watching the action. Instead, they are staring off into oblivion, apparently trying to get a good look at the blimp overhead." Steve Butts of IGN stated that although the spectators are rendered in 2D, they "look very, very real."

Todd criticized the cartoonish golfers, calling them "little more than animated mannequins, devoid of any facial features." Rosano stated that the golfers were "just about the goofiest around," calling them "awkward and cartoonish." Butts noted that most of the golfers' facial designs looked alike and that "the women are a little weird looking." Snider wrote that the Tom Lehman character "falls short of his likeness". Buxton noted an issue in which "the player animation stutters, especially when there's more than one golfer on screen." Goble noted that golfers were "capable of warping from one location to another--a phenomenon that may save time but looks totally bizarre." Marc Saltzman of GamePro criticized the game's "exaggerated" post-shot player animations, stating that in one instance, the golfer "looked like he was having a heart attack". Stephen Poole of GameSpot wrote "what little the game lacks in visual appeal it more than makes up for with an excellent interface, lifelike golfer animations, and very good ball physics." Other critics were mixed on whether the game physics were superior to the Links series.

Some praised the sound, although the commentary was generally criticized. Todd referred to the commentators as "Nostradamus and Jeane Dixon" because of their "uncanny knack for predicting where your ball is going to drop." Goble wrote that "much of the shot-making drama is negated by announcers who broadcast your ball's final resting spot almost immediately after you've swung your club." Rob Smolka of PC Gamer (U.S.) criticized the commentators for being "extremely repetitive" and "omniscient", and stated that their ability to essentially predict where the ball will land "really removes any drama from those close-call shots." Smolka further stated that the commentators "become babbling idiots around the green, congratulating you on poorly played chips and pitches, and at times misleading you on which direction your ball will break on putts." Abner disliked the commentary and its inaccuracies, writing that the commentators "have a peculiar notion as to what constitutes a good shot." Abner also criticized the commentators' "enhanced future seeing ability," which "kills any tension that watching your shot skirt with trouble can provide."

House considered the commentary to be "without doubt, the weakest and most annoying part of the game," writing that the commentators often repeated each other's comments and that they had limited vocabulary which quickly became tedious. PC Accelerator also stated that the commentary quickly becomes annoying. Macdonald called the commentary "commendable", accurate, and often informative, while Buxton wrote that the commentators occasionally gave poor advice. Chris Capell of Sports Gaming Network criticized the commentary for being repetitive and incorrect, but otherwise stated that it was of "high quality, and very authentic." Saltzman wrote that the commentary and crowd reaction "is often inconsistent with what's happening on the course," noting one instance in which the crowd "cheered wildly when I hit the ball into the trees." Goble stated that although the spectators' "cheers and groans sound very authentic, it is very strange that you don't hear a peep until your ball has come to a full stop."

Critics praised the ReadyPlay feature. House called it an "enormous innovation" and wrote, "No longer do you have to sit idly by while the other three golfers in your foursome hack away." Abner called it "both a blessing and a curse," stating that it speeds up the gameplay but that other players occasionally "stand in the way of a shot making it impossible to see where you are hitting; this is especially frustrating when on the green." Smolka also acknowledged that it speeds up the gameplay, but that it "can be a bit disconcerting - especially when you're the first to reach the green and, while you're lining up your putt, a stray golf ball comes flying right at you!"

The game's variety was praised, as well as the TrueSwing method. Abner called the TrueSwing "the biggest selling point", while stating that the three-click method was "far too easy to use and simply feels tacked on." Praising the TrueSwing method, House wrote that the game "achieves what I had begun to think of as the unattainable Holy Grail of golf simulation". Rosano wrote, "The feel of the mouse swing is truly incredible, way ahead of the competition." Capell stated that the TrueSwing was "a surprisingly natural and easy method to pick up, and has depth you wouldn't believe."

The Course Architect was considered easy to use, although Butts considered its interface to be overwhelmed by options. While some critics praised the course designer, others expressed disappointment that it does not allow the creation of holes in which the ball has to travel across water. Others noted that the program would freeze or crash. In his September 1999 review of the game, Rosano wrote that following the recent release of a patch, "the architect has repeatedly crashed at the beginning of a new session, something Sierra must address immediately." In addition, some critics noted issues in which the game would crash or freeze when playing on WON.net, although Goble noted that the website's support of the game "is still in its early stages and should improve in the future." The issue was ongoing as of November 1999.

The game sold 48,105 copies in the U.S. by April 2000.
