= The Cypher (video game) =

1995 video game

Unlock The Cypher
- Developer: EPG Multimedia
- Publishers: LAUNCH Media; World Opponent Network; MSN
- Director: Ted Evans
- Producer: Paul Gregutt
- Designers: Ted Evans; Vince Peddle; Rick Franklin
- Programmer: Kimara Sajn
- Writers: Paul Gregutt; Ted Evans
- Composer: Kimara Sajn
- Platforms: Windows; Mac OS; Web Browser
- Release: CD-ROM: US: July 1995; Online: WW: October 31, 1998
- Genres: Interactive fiction, point-and-click adventure
- Mode: Single-player

The Cypher is an interactive fiction video game by EPG Multimedia.

== Plot ==
The Cypher is a digital interactive fiction novel in eight episodic chapters that explores a murder mystery spanning ten centuries. Characters include a medieval lord, a 1900s archaeologist and a modern-day criminologist.

Players act as time-traveling detectives investigating two murders committed by the same murderer a thousand years apart. They explore numerous locations as they hunt for clues, a hidden chamber beneath a medieval castle, the offices of a Scotland Yard inspector, and the hotel room of a modern-day cryptologist. Along the way, players sift through forensic evidence, examine ancient manuscripts, decode encrypted emails, pore over illuminated books, or puzzle over ancient technology.

The story opens with John Shoresby, a cryptanalyst for SciCrypt Systems, who receives an email message from an unknown sender with no traceable source and no Internet identifier, as if from thin air. The message pleads for his help and asks him to look into a hundred year old missing person's case. When he downloads the email attachments, he recognizes the face of one of his ancestors, James Francis Ravenshim, an archeologist that vanished without a trace in the summer of 1900. Intrigued, he starts to dig into the case and discovers nothing is what it seems. James Francis’ disappearance wasn't the only inexplicable event that occurred all those years ago at Ravenshim Castle, his family's ancestral home. Weeks before, a man was found murdered in one of the underground chambers. Scotland Yard removed the body for an autopsy, but before they could examine it, the body shriveled up and mummified right before their eyes!

Shoresby continues to chase down clues, but faces obstruction at every turn. He discovers there may have been a cover up of the murder and the disappearance, aided by Scotland Yard, which ended with the complete destruction of Ravenshim Castle. What was everyone hiding and why were they still hiding it a hundred years later?

== Production and release ==
EPG Multimedia was founded to "explore the potential of interactive media". Its three founders, Ted Evans, Vince Peddle and Paul Gregutt, had backgrounds in advertising and corporate communications, and believed that interactive digital media was the best new method of delivering entertainment to the masses. They noticed that video game publishing seemed to "offer small, startup companies a chance to break into the entertainment business", and so while they were still employed at other companies, the founders began brainstorming ideas for "games that would take advantage of those opportunities". They actively wanted to push against the shovelware-filled reference titles, game titles, or children's titles that dominated the industry, and instead decided to lead the creative team for StarPress Publishing's "Material World". The program, which favored good storytelling over gaming allowed the three to start up their own studio.

The Cypher became the first completely original interactive project the EPG undertook; it was created on a shoestring budget to counteract the pattern of startup developers being at great financial risk. The team chose to focus on plot and character over puzzles and games, and favored letting players discover the story rather than take part in it. The game's graphic style was created by Evans. Early on in development the team decided to serialize the game rather than release it in all at once, an idea inspired by the work of Charles Dickens and Philip Francis Nowlan as it forces the writers to incorporate cliffhangers and aided them keeping the costs down. EPG developed the eight-episode interactive novel in Macromedia Director.

The soundtrack for the game, dubbed The Cypher Suite, was produced and performed by Kimara Sajn (with Vince Peddle on guitar in one piece) and recorded in 1996.

The eight episodes were first published in issues 2 through 10 (Jun/Jul 1995 through Dec/Jan 1996) of LAUNCH, a bimonthly entertainment CD-ROM. The creators noted that the magazine content ate up most of the CD-ROM space, which meant their content could only take up 15 MB per episode, which required them to tell an expansive narrative while remaining concise. As part of the LAUNCH CD-ROM the game was accessible to an estimated 250,000 readers.

After the initial episodic run on LAUNCH, the developers published a single CD-ROM for Mac OS and Windows with the entire The Cypher narrative including a "bonus" episode, which was also published by LAUNCH. Players could perhaps win a copy of the game by visiting LAUNCH's website and then emailing LAUNCH with "Cypher Contest" in the subject line.

EPG Multimedia partnered with Crosswater (the CD-ROM production unit of the UK-based Clearwater group) to make plans to market The Cypher in the UK as well as to translate it into French and German.

In 1998, the game entered a license with WON.net and was made available on their website as a free internet game on October 31, 1998. On WON.net the game now had twelve episodes. On WON.net it had over 2 million registered players and 2.5 million page views per month. Both The Cypher and S.P.I.T.E. (a later EPG title) had a combined registered user base of 12 million, and hits that reached over four million a week. Its stay on WON.net ended in December 1999 and the game moved on to Gameplay.com sometime in 2000.

== Reception ==
Maclopedia compared it to The Residents’ Bad Day on the Midway and The Dark Eye, both from Inscape. Media Inc. felt the game marked a "new genre of interactive fiction." Mac Home Journal said it "represent(s) the next step in the evolution of interactive narrative".

The project has won several multimedia awards in the US including a 1996 NewMedia Invision "Bronze Award" for Best Adult Entertainment Title. It also won the 1999 Invision Awards (New Media) "Gold," and 1996 Association for Multimedia "Best of Show."
