= Front Page Sports: Golf =

1997 video game

- North American cover art
- Developer: Headgate Studios
- Publisher: Sierra On-Line
- Director: Vance Cook
- Producer: Kate Kloos
- Designer: Vance Cook
- Artists: Kari St. John; Matthew Peterson
- Composer: Charles Barth
- Platform: Microsoft Windows
- Release: May 16, 1997
- Genre: Sports
- Modes: Single-player; Multiplayer

Front Page Sports: Golf is a golf simulation video game developed by Headgate Studios and published by Sierra On-Line for Microsoft Windows. The game was released in 1997, after nearly three years of development. It was particularly praised for its TrueSwing method, in which the player uses the computer mouse to simulate the golf swing.

== Gameplay ==
Front Page Sports: Golf features two golf courses: Pete Dye Golf Club in West Virginia, and the Prince Course in Hawaii. A total of 12 game modes are featured, including four-ball, greensome, match, scramble, skins, Stableford, stroke, and the Ryder Cup.

The game features Tom Lehman as a playable character, and other golfers can be custom made. Player customization options include the selection of skin color and gender. Clothing, including pants, can also be customized. The game includes an option that enables computer-controlled golfers to learn how to improve their golfing. The game features a golf swing method known as TrueSwing, in which the player moves the computer mouse backward and forward to simulate the golf swing. The game also includes a traditional three-click swing method.

The game features several multiplayer options, including LAN and modem. At the time of release, players could also log on to the Sierra Internet Gaming System (SIGS).

== Development and release ==
Front Page Sports: Golf was developed by Headgate Studios and published by Sierra On-Line. The game was in development for nearly three years, with a team of six people working on it. Vance Cook was the game's producer and designer. He had previously worked on Links 386 Pro. Cook and the development team spent hours studying golf ball dynamics to ensure the accuracy of the game physics.

While computer golf games traditionally used a meter to execute the golf swing, Cook and his team experimented with new ways to perform the swing, including a top-down perspective. Ultimately, Cook devised the idea of players using the computer mouse to swing the golf club. The TrueSwing feature would later be implemented into PGA Championship Golf 1999 Edition, also by Headgate and Sierra. The golfers are made of texture-mapped polygons. Before each course was mapped, the design team visited them to take video footage and hundreds of photos. Planes were flown over the courses to obtain aerial photographs.

Sierra purchased Headgate Studios in 1996, giving the latter company additional resources to perfect the game. Front Page Sports: Golf was once planned for release in November 1996. The multiplayer aspect was not initially planned, and was implemented late in development. The game neared completion as of April 1997, and it was released for Microsoft Windows shortly thereafter. Two course add-on disks were also released for the game, starting with Coeur d'Alene Resort and followed by Black Diamond Ranch. For a limited time at its launch, the game included the Coeur d'Alene disk for free. Several thousand copies of the add-on disk were manufactured to go with copies of the game, while subsequent copies of the add-on disk would be sold separately.

In 1999, the game was reissued as Golf: All American Sports Series.

== Reception ==
Reception

Review scores
Publication	Score
Computer Games Strategy Plus	4.5/5
Computer Gaming World	4/5
GameRevolution	A−
GameSpot	8.1/10
Gamecenter	8/10
PC Magazine	2/5

Front Page Sports: Golf was critically acclaimed. Game Revolution called it "a gem of a golf sim" and a "strong title in every sense", while Scott A. May of Computer Gaming World stated that the game was "worth the wait." John Zhaski of InterAction Magazine called it "the most playable and realistic golf game available for the PC." Jeff Lackey of Computer Games Strategy Plus called it "a very pleasant surprise" and "a true breakthrough" in computer golf, stating that it revolutionized the golf swing method and that as a result, it "has likely changed the face of all golf games to come."

While SimGolf was the first golf game to introduce a mouse-controlled swing method, critics considered the TrueSwing to be a superior version. Tasos Kaiafas of GameSpot considered the TrueSwing to be "the one critical component" that made the game stand out from others. Lackey also believed that the TrueSwing made the game stand out, writing that the feature "just feels like golf in a way that no other golf sim duplicates." Stephen Bilodeau of Edmonton Journal called it a "superb game" and stated that it "becomes a lot more interesting" once the player has gotten used to the TrueSwing.

Malcolm X Abram of the Atlanta Journal and Constitution wrote that the TrueSwing method "is instantly more absorbing than the traditional three-click method", while Gordon Goble of Gamecenter considered the TrueSwing natural and unrestrained. May considered the TrueSwing to be the game's "biggest innovation" but stated that it requires practice. Game Revolution considered the TrueSwing realistic and impressive, but also stated that it "definitely takes some getting used to." T. Liam McDonald of PC Magazine was disappointed with the TrueSwing, stating that it "leaves too many shots short." McDonald considered Front Page Sports: Golf to be a "modest golf game" that needed improvement in order to compete against other golf games.

Some critics praised the graphics, although Goble considered them slightly inferior to Jack Nicklaus 4 and the Links LS games. McDonald noted inconsistencies with the graphics, such as "nice grass textures but flat and pixelized object rendering." Kaiafas stated that the graphics were "certainly good, but nothing stellar." Kaiafas praised the game for using 3D golfers rather than the FMV golfers typically used in other games, as 3D allows the golfers to react in real time to the mouse swing, as well as have various post-show reactions. May also praised the polygonal golfers, stating that they had faster animation and a wider range of motions and emotions. Game Revolution also praised the golfer designs and their post-shot reactions.

The game also received some praise for its sound, its multiplayer options, and its physics. Goble stated that the ball movements were "consistent and startlingly authentic". May praised the realistic gameplay and the ability of the computer-controlled players to learn, while Game Revolution praised the ability to customize the golfers' pants. Goble stated that the game "is hampered somewhat by rare technical flaws" such as crashes, and stated that like other golf games, it "is strong in some areas and weak in others". Lackey complained of poor artificial intelligence at times, as well as bugs, which Sierra aimed to remedy with a patch.
