= Littlest Pet Shop (video game) =

2008 video game

- Developers: EA Salt Lake; Full Fat
- Publisher: Electronic Arts
- Series: Littlest Pet Shop
- Platforms: Microsoft Windows, Wii, DSiWare
- Release: Microsoft Windows, Wii: NA: October 14, 2008; EU: October 17, 2008; DSiWare: NA: December 14, 2009; EU: December 18, 2009
- Genre: Simulation
- Mode: Single-player

Littlest Pet Shop is a video game developed by EA Salt Lake and Full Fat and published by Electronic Arts for Microsoft Windows, Wii, and DSiWare, released in North America on October 14, 2008. The DS version came in four different editions with different pets available: Jungle, Garden, Winter, and Spring.

The game allows players to collect digital versions of the toys and play minigames to earn currency which can be used to buy new items and pets. The game would later receive two sequels, Littlest Pet Shop Friends in 2009, and Littlest Pet Shop 3: Biggest Stars in 2010.

== Gameplay ==
The game revolves around collecting virtual versions of the Littlest Pet Shop figures, expanding your environment as you do so. Players can compete in a variety of minigames to earn the in-game currency, Kibble, which can be used to purchase train tickets to invite new pets, playsets, and accessories to dress up their pets. Players keep their pets happy by traveling to different areas with them, feeding them, and playing with them. The minigames all have a difficulty setting that can be changed, and award the player with ribbons based on how they perform.

In the DS version of the game, the pets can be guided around the map using the stylus. Despite being predominantly singleplayer, they can also be played over a wireless connection, where up to 15 players can show off their pets, play minigames together, and exchange items.

The DS versions of the game have 20 pets each and over 150 accessories to collect, while the Wii version has all of the pets from the DS versions, except for the later-released Spring. The DSiWare version lacks many of the minigames the other editions have, while the PC version leaves them out entirely.

== Development ==
In August 2007, Electronic Arts gained the rights to some Hasbro brands, like Monopoly, Littlest Pet Shop, and Nerf. In February, EA Casual Entertainment announced that their EA Salt Lake Studio, alongside Full Fat, would develop and release Littlest Pet Shop and Nerf N-Strike.

In Fall 2008, the Littlest Pet Shop video game was released for Wii, Microsoft Windows, and Nintendo DS. For Nintendo DS, the game was initially released in three versions: Jungle, Garden and Winter, each with different pets. A fourth DS version, Spring, was released in March 2009. A DSiWare edition of Littlest Pet Shop was released in North America on December 14, 2009, and in the PAL regions on December 18, 2009, costing 800 Nintendo points.

Littlest Pet Shop Friends, a sequel to the game, was released in October 2009 for Wii and Nintendo DS. The Nintendo DS versions include: City Friends, Country Friends, and Beach Friends. The third and final entry in the series, Littlest Pet Shop 3: Biggest Stars, was released in October 2010. Like previous entries, it too came in three versions: Blue Team, Pink Team, and Purple Team.

== Reception ==
Nicki Sparks of Nintendo Life praised the game, calling it "strangely addictive" despite its young target demographic, though stresses that it will likely appeal more to kids than adults. Fellow Nintendo Life staff member Desiree Turner compliments the game's graphics, saying that "EA did a great job capturing the look and feel of the pets and their quirky little environment" and that the animation is smooth. Writing for Vooks, James Mitchell agrees, calling the cinematic cutscenes "surprisingly rendered really well" and saying that the game has "amazing graphics for the system". Despite this, he also concludes that the game is likely too simple to appeal to an older audience, calling it a "boring and mundane watered down version of The Sims".

Turner gives the DSiWare version of the game a score of 4/10, pointing out its stripped down nature compared to the full DS releases, having only three minigames to play as opposed to the main releases' much wider variety.
