= Tiger Woods PGA Tour 07 =

- Developers: EA Redwood Shores (Note: Ported to PlayStation 2, Windows, and Xbox by Headgate Studios, and to the Wii under Headgate's rebranded name: EA Salt Lake); Team Fusion (PSP)
- Publisher: EA Sports
- Series: PGA Tour
- Platforms: Microsoft Windows, PlayStation 2, Xbox, PlayStation Portable, Xbox 360, PlayStation 3, Wii
- Release: Microsoft Windows, PlayStation 2, Xbox: AU: September 21, 2006; EU: September 22, 2006; NA: October 10, 2006; PlayStation Portable: EU: September 22, 2006; AU: September 28, 2006; NA: October 10, 2006; Xbox 360: NA: October 17, 2006; AU: October 26, 2006; EU: October 27, 2006; PlayStation 3: NA: November 17, 2006; AU: March 22, 2007; EU: March 23, 2007; Wii: NA: March 13, 2007; AU: March 15, 2007; EU: March 23, 2007
- Genre: Sports
- Modes: Single-player, multiplayer

Tiger Woods PGA Tour 07 is a sports video game for the Microsoft Windows, PlayStation 2, PlayStation Portable, Xbox, Xbox 360, Wii and as a launch title for the PlayStation 3 version and was published by EA Sports. The online multiplayer for Xbox was shut down on July 1, 2008. The PC versions multiplayer was shut down on February 2, 2010.

== New features ==
The game includes updated graphics, new courses, and other new features.

The "Game Face" feature has been vastly improved with more detail and customization available for each body part, and after designing their own golfer, players can choose from 3000 items in the "Pro Shop" which allows players to purchase new clothing, clubs, balls, gloves, and other golf-related miscellanea. However, many items are locked at the start of the game, and the player must complete certain tasks to unlock these items.

The "Game Setup" in the options menu has been changed vastly, to allow the player to choose their swing style. Another new feature allows players to choose the classic control settings or a newer swing style. There is also the new "Speed Golf" setting, which allows players to skip to the next shot after the ball has been struck without watching where the ball lands.

== Game modes ==
Screenshot from the PSP version of the game

Seven new game modes have been added (One-Ball, Team One-Ball, no balls, Bloodsome, Greensome, Elimination and Team balls black balls).

=== Real time events ===
Several of the older game modes have been improved, such as the "Real Time Event Calendar" which allows the player to play special events on different days of the year based on their system's internal clock. This has replaced the classic "Scenario Mode" but there is now a Real Time Event for every day of the year.

=== Greensome/Bloodsome ===
Two new types of traditional game mode have been added this year, "greensome" and "bloodsome". In "greensome", two teams of two golfers both hit their golf balls from the tee, but after that, only one of the balls is played (this is the team captain's choice). Players will then alternate shots with the chosen ball until it is holed. The game of "bloodsome" has similar rules, with the exception that the opposing team chooses which ball is played. The scoring system uses match play rules.

=== Team tour ===
The "Team Tour" mode allows players using their own created golfers to build up their own team to travel the world playing in different types of game modes until they reach the final match against Tiger Woods' team. With each victory, the player is allowed more golfers to be added to their team. The golfers that are available are the golfers that they have just beaten. In each round, the player may also "Up the Ante" to gain extra experience and free modifiers if they win under specific circumstances; for example, the "Beat The Spread" option for Match Play games starts the opponent 4UP (see match play rules below), and the "Without a Net" option means that if the ball goes in the water or out of bounds, the player instantly loses. Team Tour is the quickest way to gain experience.

=== Stroke Play ===
Stroke play is in the "Traditional Game Modes" section. Stroke Play allows up to four players to compete on a round of 9 or 18 holes on any chosen course with variable difficulty settings (tee color, pin location etc.). All golfers use their own ball. The player numbers determine who tees off first on the first hole, but after the first hole, the player with the lowest score tees off first, then the second lowest score and so on. After the initial tee shot, the player furthest from the hole takes their shot next. However many shots or "strokes" the player takes is recorded on the scorecard after each hole.

=== Match play ===
A modified version of stroke play with the exception that the winner of each hole goes "1UP" depending on their current score. For example, on the first hole, the score will be "AS" (All Square), but the player that wins the hole will then score 1 hole, and their score will change to "1UP", meaning that player is winning by one hole. The game continues until either player wins enough holes that the other player(s) cannot win. If there is a situation where a player is the same number up as there are holes remaining (for example, 5UP with 5 holes to play), they are declared to be "Dormie X" (where X is the number of holes that player is winning by). Once a player is Dormie, the other player must then win every remaining hole to force Sudden Death, or else the player who is "Dormie" wins the match. If a hole is tied, the player who is "Dormie" wins, although the score does not change.

=== Skillzone ===
The Skillzone was introduced in Tiger Woods PGA Tour 2003; it features three unique areas which have 15 targets in each. The player can compete in various games in these areas for extra money to buy items from the pro shop. The three courses available are: Granite Pass, Diablo Valley, and The Roof. The various game modes each have their own rules which players must abide by. The game types are:

- Target: The player begins with 15 balls to hit as many of the targets as possible. Successive hits on the targets results in cash being earned and more balls being given.
- Target2Target: A variation of "Target". The computer randomly picks a target which the player must hit. The same rules as "Target" apply.
- Capture: This game mode requires 2 human players. The players alternate turns to hit targets and earn money. The first player to hit 5 targets wins. However, a player can "steal" a target by landing on the target closer to the bullseye than the opponent.
- T-I-G-E-R: A variation of the classic "Horse". The player hits a target, and their opponent must match the score (same ring on the particular target) or beat it. The first player to fail to do so receives a letter, and the first to spell "Tiger" loses.

=== Skills 18 ===
This game mode was only introduced in Tiger Woods PGA Tour 06, so it is one of the most recent additions. The player chooses a course and difficulty settings to play on before beginning. On each hole there are 3 hovering rings; a large green ring, a medium-sized yellow ring, and a small red ring. The player must attempt to hit their ball through these rings while maintaining a good score (Birdies, Eagles etc.). The harder the ring, the more points it is worth. Hitting the ball through more than one ring in a single shot results in bonus points being awarded.

=== Shootout mode ===
Shootout Mode is entirely different from any of the other game modes. Before the match begins, 2 or more players pick up to 8 golfers per team on 2 teams. These teams then play against each other in stroke play format on each hole of the chosen course. The loser of the hole is eliminated from the match, and the next player in their team takes their place, while the winner keeps playing until he/she is defeated. If players tie on a hole, both players advance to the next hole.

=== One-ball/team one-ball ===
In One-Ball, as the name suggests, both players will use only one ball, and will alternate shots with it until the ball is holed. Whoever sinks the ball will win the hole. Although the player is allowed to make it more difficult for their opponent by striking the ball into an undesirable position such as a bunker, the rough, etc., the shot must travel at least half of the distance to the hole on each stroke. If the player fails to do this, he or she will be marked with a "Betrayal", and will lose one turn. Similarly, if a player hits the ball out of bounds, he or she will be penalized with a "Double Betrayal", and will lose two consecutive turns. This gives the gameplay a tactical twist, in that the players are typically trying to make the worst legal shot possible. Additionally, a player must carefully decide when to finally attack the hole, since a narrowly missed putt or chip-in can set up the opponent for an easy hole.

Team-One Ball is played in the same format, but uses two teams of two golfers each.

=== Bestball/fourball ===
These are both 2-team, 4-player (mix of human and CPU players is allowed) games. All four players play all of their balls for the hole, in the same style as what would be if it was a 4-player Stroke Play match. The best scoring golfer on each team's score will be applied in either Stroke or Match play.

=== PGA tour season mode ===
==== General ====
The PGA Tour Season Mode allows players to play in various tournaments across a 30-year career, using their own created golfer. Each tournament is 72 holes (4 rounds) played at different courses, usually determined by the name of the event (e.g. "The Pebble Beach Open" or "The UK Major Championship"). The game mode is designed to be as realistic as possible, with players able to view the scoreboard after each hole, which shows the scores for each round, how many holes the golfer has played in the current round and the total number of strokes they have taken.

==== Guests & the cut ====
The player whose profile is being used may "invite" other human players into the tournaments as guests, but this is only possible in the first round, and the guests must play all four rounds, they cannot skip a round, however, the profile's owner (the profile whose PGA Tour Season Mode it is) can choose to "Cut" the guest (remove them from the tournament) before any round. Note that guests cannot receive trophies, earn FedEx Cup points or improve their PGA Tour Ranking while playing as a guest. After the second round of a tournament, only the Top 70 golfers in the tournament advance, the rest are cut.

==== Requirements ====
Some tournaments have specific entry requirements such as "Top 20 PGA Tour Ranked Players Only" - if the player does not meet the requirement, they are not allowed to participate in that tournament and the first round will be locked, preventing entry.

==== Match play tournaments ====
Some tournaments such as the Australian Challenge and the EA Match Play Championship are played against an opponent with match play rules, and guests cannot be invited into match play tournaments.

== "Game Face" and "My Team" menus ==
=== "Game Face" ===
The "Game Face" menu has been combined with a new "My Team" option which allows players to modify their skills, buy equipment from the pro shop, change the animations their golfer uses, and change their team's logo, name and uniform. However, initially, the player must design his/her custom golfer using the game face option from the main menu. The Game Face feature has been greatly improved, and now the player must customize everything, from muscles on the arms and length of the legs to the smallest detail of wrinkles or the bridge of the nose. The new system also allows players to create the way their golfer looks in terms of body part size, muscle, fat, feature positioning (face) and the overall height.

=== "My Team" ===
On entering the "Game Face" option and selecting a golfer that has already been created, the player is faced with the "My Team" menu which shows the team's name and logo at the top of the screen, as well as four portraits of members of the player's current team. The portrait of the created golfer also features several menu options including (in no particular order): My Skills, My Appearance, My Animations, Pro Shop, Team Name, Team Logo & Team Uniform. Each of these different menu commands takes the player to different parts of the "My Team" area.

- My Skills: This option goes to the stats screen, where the player can view and edit their stats, as well as check their current experience and any equipped modifiers.
- My Appearance: This option accesses the "Game Face" tool to allow the player to make any more changes to the way their golfer looks. Height, size and details can all be changed here just as they could be in the initial character creation.
- My Animations: This option allows the player to choose what their golfer does after a good hole such as scoring Birdie or Eagle, what the golfer does after scoring Bogey or worse, and allows the player to buy a new swing style, or customize their own unique swing. Note that customized swings cannot contain modifiers, while most of the swings available to purchase have one level one power modifier.
- Pro Shop: The pro shop contains (when everything is unlocked) a total of 3000 items in different categories ranging from Shirts and Pants to Clubs, Gloves and Balls.
- Team Name: This allows the player to name their team. As with the player name, there is an 8-character limit.
- Team Logo: This allows the player to choose a logo from a long list of pre-made logos or design their own, and even edit pre-made logos with an advanced designing tool that allows players to create almost any image.
- Team Uniform: This section allows the player to choose what other members of their team as well as the player will wear. This is somewhat basic, the only option here is to choose the colour of the shirt that the players' teammate(s) will wear.

== Experience points and stats ==
By playing in certain game types, the player earns experience points represented by gold markers on the left of the screen. Performing different actions earns different types of experience, for example, hitting a long drive will yield Power experience, while sinking a long putt will give Concentration experience. To use the experience points they have earned, players must go into the Game Face/My Team section and select the option "My Skills" - this section shows what level the player's stats currently are, how much experience they need to advance to the next level and how much experience they have. If the player has enough experience in either a particular stat, or a combination of that stat and "General" experience, they are allowed to increase the stat level by one.

== The roster ==
Tiger Woods PGA Tour 07 features an extensive roster of 53 golfers, 21 of which are real, and the other 32 are fictional golfers designed by EA. Many fictional golfers from previous games return in Tiger Woods PGA Tour 07, including as Edwin Masterson, Takeharu Moto and Moa Ta'a Vatu.

== Reception ==
Reception

Aggregate score
Aggregator	Score						
Aggregator	PC	PS2	PS3	PSP	Wii	Xbox	Xbox 360
Metacritic	73/100	79/100	81/100	78/100	71/100	81/100	80/100

Review scores
Publication	Score						
Publication	PC	PS2	PS3	PSP	Wii	Xbox	Xbox 360
Electronic Gaming Monthly	N/A	N/A	N/A	N/A	7.33/10	N/A	7.17/10
Eurogamer	N/A	7/10	N/A	N/A	7/10	N/A	8/10
Game Informer	8/10	8/10	N/A	N/A	6.5/10	8/10	8/10
GamePro	N/A	3.5/5	3.75/5	N/A	3.5/5	3.5/5	3.75/5
GameRevolution	N/A	N/A	N/A	N/A	C	N/A	N/A
GameSpot	7.5/10	7.8/10	8.2/10	7/10	7.5/10	7.8/10	8.2/10
GameSpy	N/A	4/5	3.5/5	4/5	4/5	4/5	4.5/5
GameTrailers	N/A	N/A	N/A	N/A	7.3/10	N/A	N/A
GameZone	7.5/10	8.5/10	8.5/10	8.6/10	8.3/10	8.7/10	8.5/10
IGN	7.5/10	8.5/10	8.3/10	8/10	7/10	8.5/10	8.5/10
Nintendo Power	N/A	N/A	N/A	N/A	8.5/10	N/A	N/A
Official U.S. PlayStation Magazine	N/A	8/10	7.5/10	8/10	N/A	N/A	N/A
Official Xbox Magazine (US)	N/A	N/A	N/A	N/A	N/A	9/10	8.5/10
PC Gamer (UK)	74%	N/A	N/A	N/A	N/A	N/A	N/A
The A.V. Club	N/A	N/A	N/A	N/A	B	N/A	N/A
Detroit Free Press	N/A	N/A	N/A	N/A	N/A	N/A	3/4

Tiger Woods PGA Tour 07 received "mixed or average" reviews on the PC and Wii and "generally favorable" reviews on all other platforms, according to review aggregator Metacritic.

Detroit Free Press gave the Xbox 360 version a score of three stars out of four and stated that "The one real knock is that it takes a while for the screen to load in between holes. Also, a large grid that appears when you putt clunks up the play and takes away from the detailed graphics."

Charles Herold of The New York Times gave the Wii version a positive reception, saying, "I actually got the best results when I sat on my couch and swung the remote from side to side, which generally resulted in straight, powerful drives. But I just didn't feel right playing the game that way; I'm sure Tiger Woods wouldn't approve." The A.V. Club gave the same version a B and said, "Every golf and back-injury enthusiast should give this a try. The controls will aggravate for a while, but with enough practice, they're a non-issue." The Sydney Morning Herald, however, gave the game a score of three-and-a-half stars out of five, saying, "The Xbox 360 version Icon tested features 12 beautifully recreated courses, astonishingly realistic player animation and convincing crowds that even react when you hit a wayward drive in their direction."
