= Pasatiempo Golf Club =

Golf club in Pasatiempo, California

- Location within the United States Location within California
- 37.004°N 122.026°W

Club information
- Location: Pasatiempo, Santa Cruz County, California, U.S.
- Elevation: 500 feet (150 m)
- Established: 1929; 97 years ago
- Type: Semi-private
- Tota holes: 18
- Website: www.pasatiempo.com
- Designed by: Alister MacKenzie; Jim Urbina (restoration) (2023-2024)
- Par: 70
- Length: 6,500 yards (5,944 m)
- Course rating: 72.4
- Slope rating: 143

Pasatiempo Golf Club is an 18-hole golf club on the West Coast of the United States, located in Pasatiempo, Santa Cruz County, California.

== History ==
Marion Hollins hired English golf course designer Alister MacKenzie to design and build Pasatiempo Golf Course, which included an equestrian center with polo fields. The course opened on September 8, 1929 with a celebrity golf match, with Bobby Jones in the first to play it.

MacKenzie claimed that it was his best layout, ahead of even Cypress Point and Augusta National, and his American home borders the sixth fairway. Pasatiempo is about an hour's drive from Cypress Point, a Monterey Peninsula neighbor to Spyglass Hill and Pebble Beach.

Pasatiempo is a highly rated course — it is ranked 11 in Golf Magazine's "Top 100 Courses You Can Play 2024-2025" and ranked 15 in Golf Digest's "2025 America’s Greatest Public Courses". Golf Digest also named Pasatiempo Golf Club as one of the top 3 "Courses You Can Play in California" (along with Pebble Beach and Spyglass Hill). The magazine ranked Pasatiempo 96 in the "Top 100 Courses in the U.S. (private and public)", up 2 places over the 2024 ranking.

The course was recreated in the videogames PGA Championship Golf and Tiger Woods PGA Tour 06.

== Scorecard ==
Pasatiempo Golf Club
Tee	Rating/Slope	1	2	3	4	5	6	7	8	9	Out	10	11	12	13	14	15	16	17	18	In	Total
SI	Championship	4	8	2	16	10	6	12	14	18		5	3	13	15	7	17	1	9	11
Championship	72.4 / 143	457	437	214	378	190	567	348	176	500	3267	440	392	373	531	429	141	387	371	169	3233	6500
Par		4	4	3	4	3	5	4	3	5	35	4	4	4	5	4	3	4	4	3	35	70
Middle	70.8 / 135	440	420	195	358	174	516	335	162	473	3073	440	379	373	485	384	120	365	363	143	3052	6125
SI	Middle	4	8	2	14	6	16	10	12			18	5	3	13	15	7	17	1	9
Forward	68.9 / 130	457	376	175	343	156	486	327	150	420	2890	440	311	373	446	331	96	353	357	88	2795	5685
Ladies	73.9 / 136	457	376	175	343	156	486	327	150	420	2890	440	311	373	446	331	96	353	357	88	2795	5685
Par		5	4	3	4	3	5	4	3	5	36	5	4	4	5	4	3	4	4	3	36	72
SI	Forward	14	6	10	8	16	2	4	18	12		9	1	7	11	13	15	3	5	17
