= Nerf Arena Blast =

1999 video game

- Version of the front box cover, with a player firing a Nerf "Wildfire".
- Developers: Visionary Media, Inc. Mondo Media (cutscenes and artwork)
- Publisher: Hasbro Interactive
- Designer: David Walls
- Engine: Unreal Engine 1
- Platform: Microsoft Windows
- Release: NA: November 2, 1999; UK: March 10, 2000
- Genre: First-person shooter
- Modes: Single-player, multiplayer

Nerf Arena Blast (known as Nerf Arena in Europe) is a first-person shooter developed by Visionary Media, Inc. and published by Hasbro Interactive, released under their Atari Interactive label. The game, based on Nerf, was touted as a "family-friendly version of multiplayer combat games like Quake III: Arena and Unreal Tournament", and was supported by Hasbro Interactive until that company gave its rights and properties over to Infogrames. The cutscenes were animated by Mondo Media alongside them doing the in-game art.

== Gameplay ==
=== Single-player ===
The player starts on a team called the "Twisters", an amateur team competing for the "Nerf Champion of the World" title against 6 professional teams. The player must compete in each team's 3 arenas, totaling 21 playable maps (including the amateur and championship maps), plus a handful of "Bonus Round" maps. In order to compete against the next team the user has to place in the top three in each event (PointBlast, SpeedBlast, and BallBlast).

==== Game types ====
- PointBlast: PointBlast is based on the Unreal Deathmatch game type; instead of gaining kills, or Frags, the player gains points by either hitting an opponent, knocking or tagging an opponent out, hitting targets in the arenas, or by picking up "Bonus Points" tokens left by "tagged out" players.
- SpeedBlast: SpeedBlast is a race between players where both have to pass through seven colored flags in sequence. Players are allowed to tag each other out of the race using their Nerf guns, with the tagged players returning to the last flag they touched.
- BallBlast: BallBlast is a Scavenger-hunt game type, where players fight for colored balls, in order to shoot them into targets. Doing this gives the players a certain number of points, depending on which ball they shoot in. Once a player gets the first six balls into the target, a seventh ball (called the "gold ball") is added to the game. The game is ended by any player shooting all balls including the golden ball into the target. The winner of the match is whoever has the most points when the game ends, rather than who shoots the gold ball into the target.

=== Multiplayer ===
Due to the similarities between Unreal Tournament and Nerf Arena Blast, it is possible to play Pointblast in team mode, because Pointblast is essentially a Deathmatch game type in most aspects, except for the scoring system. Other than that, the game types in single player mode apply to multiplayer mode. The community has released a Capture the Flag mod, which has given rise to a large number of new maps for NAB.

== Expandability ==
Nerf Arena Blast used Unreal Engine and therefore supports user-made maps and add-ons to the game, but due to some parts of the engine being altered, the ability to create add-ons like in Unreal Tournament is somewhat limited. However, hundreds of maps and modifications of Unreal maps have been published, and multiple modified weapons and game modes (such as Capture the Flag) have been created.

== Reception ==
Reception

Review score
Publication	Score
The Sydney Morning Herald	4.5/5

- "Nerf Arena Blast", IGN review [8.8/10]
- GameSpot review of NAB [7.0/10]

== See also ==
- Nerf N-Strike – a 2008 Nerf-themed rail shooter for the Wii.
- Nerf N-Strike Elite – the 2009 sequel to Nerf N-Strike.
