= Monopoly Streets =

2010 video game

- North American PlayStation 3 box art
- Developer(s): EA Salt Lake
- Publisher(s): Electronic Arts
- Series: Monopoly
- Platform(s): PlayStation 3, Xbox 360, Wii
- Release: October 26, 2010
- Genre(s): Board game, strategy
- Mode(s): Single-player, multiplayer

Monopoly Streets is a video game based on the board game of the same name, and one of the many video game adaptations of Monopoly. Developed by EA Salt Lake and published by Electronic Arts, the game was released on the PlayStation 3, Xbox 360, and Wii on October 26, 2010.

== Development ==
The game was released to celebrate the 75th anniversary of the Monopoly board game.

== Gameplay ==
The gameplay at its core is largely the same as the original board game it is based on, but the board is presented as a living, breathing city, featuring pictural illustrations of each of the properties being constructed as they are bought, with designs based on the economic status of the surrounding area. In addition, each player token is represented by a character, e.g. a boy in tuxedo for the top hat token. Elements such as auctions are done with streamlined and automated systems. The game also includes an achievement system that allows the player to unlock in-game content, such as tokens and boards.

== Critical reception ==
The game received a Metacritic rating of 64% (PlayStation 3), 66% (Xbox 360), and 65% (Wii). Meanwhile, the game received a GameRankings rating of 64.11% (PlayStation 3), 67.22% (Xbox 360), and 64.29% (Wii).

IGN reviewer Colin Moriarty scored the PlayStation 3 and Xbox 360 versions a 7.5, but scored the Wii version a full point lower due to the lack of "online functionality".
