= Pasatiempo, California =

Census-designated place in California, United States

Pasatiempo
- census-designated place
- Position in California.
- Coordinates: 37°00′17″N 122°01′47″W
- Country: United States
- State: California
- County: Santa Cruz

Area
  - Total: 0.890 sq mi (2.306 km^{2})
  - Land: 0.890 sq mi (2.306 km^{2})
  - Water: 0 sq mi (0 km^{2}) 0%
- Elevation: 394 ft (120 m)

Population (2020)
  - Total: 1,093
  - Density: 1,228/sq mi (474.0/km^{2})
- Time zone: UTC−8 (Pacific (PST))
  - Summer (DST): UTC−7 (PDT)
- ZIP Code: 95060
- Area code: 831
- GNIS feature ID: 2583108

Pasatiempo (Spanish for "Pastime") is an unincorporated community and census-designated place (CDP) in Santa Cruz County, California, United States, located along State Route 17 between Scotts Valley and Santa Cruz. Bus service is provided by Santa Cruz Metro and the Highway 17 Express. Pasatiempo sits at an elevation of 394 feet (120 m). The 2020 United States census reported Pasatiempo's population was 1,093.

The ZIP Code is 95060 and the community is part of area code 831.

== History ==
Pasatiempo was founded by Marion Hollins, winner of the 1921 Women's U.S. Amateur Golf title and captain of the US Curtis Cup team in 1932. Marion Hollins came to California in the mid-1920s to work for Samuel Morse, owner of the Pebble Beach company, and given responsibility for establishing Cypress Point golf club. After Seth Raynor died, she hired Alister MacKenzie to design the course. MacKenzie gives her credit for designing Cypress Point's famous par 3 16th hole.

After Cypress Point, Marion Hollins set out to build her own golf course and sports center, and on January 12, 1928, she announced that she would be building a sports and real estate complex on land just outside Santa Cruz, CA, calling the area Pasatiempo Estates. She hired noted architect William Wurster to build her home, which still stands today at 33 Hollins Drive inside Pasatiempo. She also brought in Alister MacKenzie to design a course at Pasatiempo Golf Club, which opened in September 1929 with a match featuring Bobby Jones MacKenzie established his home in Pasatiempo, which still stands along the 6th Fairway of the course on Pasatiempo Drive. Pasatiempo Golf Club is located in the community.

Although Marion Hollins' plans for Pasatiempo originally included a steeplechase course, bridle paths, a park and a beach club on Monterey Bay, her ambitious plans were thwarted by the Great Depression. In November 1940, she left Pasatiempo in a shakeup of Pasatiempo Estates and moved to Monterey, where she died of cancer. Today, Pasatiempo Golf Club remains a Top 100 Golf Club, and the development still has the original clubhouse (now called the "Hollins House"), a swimming pool, and tennis courts.

== Geography ==
According to the United States Census Bureau, the CDP covers an area of 0.9 square mile (2.3 km^{2}), all land.

== Demographics ==
Historical population
Census	Pop.	Note	%±
2010	1,041		—
2020	1,093		5.0%
U.S. Decennial Census; 2010

Pasatiempo first appeared as a census designated place in the 2010 U.S. census.

=== Racial and ethnic composition ===
Pasatiempo CDP, California – Racial and ethnic composition Note: the US Census treats Hispanic/Latino as an ethnic category. This table excludes Latinos from the racial categories and assigns them to a separate category. Hispanics/Latinos may be of any race.
Race / Ethnicity (NH = Non-Hispanic)	Pop 2010	Pop 2020	% 2010	% 2020
White alone (NH)	883	891	84.82%	81.52%
Black or African American alone (NH)	5	5	0.48%	0.46%
Native American or Alaska Native alone (NH)	3	2	0.29%	0.18%
Asian alone (NH)	34	53	3.27%	4.85%
Native Hawaiian or Pacific Islander alone (NH)	1	0	0.10%	0.00%
Other race alone (NH)	0	5	0.00%	0.46%
Mixed race or Multiracial (NH)	30	52	2.88%	4.76%
Hispanic or Latino (any race)	85	85	8.17%	7.78%
Total	1,041	1,093	100.00%	100.00%

=== 2020 census ===
As of the 2020 census, Pasatiempo had a population of 1,093. The population density was 1,228.1 inhabitants per square mile (474.2/km^{2}). The racial and ethnic makeup by 2020 census categories is shown in the table above.

100.0% of residents lived in urban areas, while 0.0% lived in rural areas. The whole population lived in households. There were 422 households, out of which 114 (27.0%) had children under the age of 18 living in them, 305 (72.3%) were married-couple households, 25 (5.9%) were cohabiting couple households, 57 (13.5%) had a female householder with no spouse or partner present, and 35 (8.3%) had a male householder with no spouse or partner present. 58 households (13.7%) were one person, and 36 (8.5%) were one person aged 65 or older. The average household size was 2.59. There were 339 families (80.3% of all households).

The age distribution was 179 people (16.4%) under the age of 18, 53 people (4.8%) aged 18 to 24, 182 people (16.7%) aged 25 to 44, 332 people (30.4%) aged 45 to 64, and 347 people (31.7%) who were 65 years of age or older. The median age was 53.8 years. For every 100 females, there were 100.6 males, and for every 100 females age 18 and over there were 101.3 males age 18 and over.

There were 455 housing units at an average density of 511.2 units per square mile (197.4 units/km^{2}), of which 422 (92.7%) were occupied. Of these, 376 (89.1%) were owner-occupied, and 46 (10.9%) were occupied by renters. 7.3% of housing units were vacant. The homeowner vacancy rate was 2.1% and the rental vacancy rate was 6.1%.
