= Nerf N-Strike Elite =

2009 video game

- Developer: EA Salt Lake
- Publisher: Electronic Arts
- Designer: Kyle Pew
- Series: Nerf N-Strike
- Platform: Wii
- Release: NA: October 27, 2009
- Genre: Rail shooter
- Modes: Single-player, multiplayer

Nerf N-Strike Elite is a 2009 on-rails shoot 'em up for Nintendo Wii and sequel to the 2008 Nerf N-Strike. Like its predecessor, the game is bundled with one N-Strike Switch Shot EX-3. New to this game, however, is the "Red Reveal" decoder lens which is attached to the Switch Shot and, when the player looks through it, will display hidden game elements such as the weak points in enemy armor and reveals secret codes for accessing other content. This game is also compatible with the Wii Zapper.

Nerf N-Strike and N-Strike Elite were compiled in the 2010 release Nerf N-Strike Double Blast Bundle.

== Reception ==
Reception

Aggregate score
Aggregator	Score
Metacritic	67/100

Review scores
Publication	Score
GameZone	7.3/10
IGN	7.5/10
Nintendo World Report	7/10

Nerf N-Strike Elite received mixed reviews from critics, similar to its predecessor. On Metacritic, the game holds a score of 67/100 based on 12 reviews. The game received praise for its included blaster and the inclusion of co-operative multiplayer, but was criticized for being short and repetitive.

== See also ==
- Nerf Arena Blast – the 1999 first-person shooter by Hasbro Interactive
