= Attack Retrieve Capture =

- Logo for the game
- Developer: Hoopy Entertainment
- Publishers: Hoopy Entertainment (1995–1998); Total Entertainment Network (1998–1999); World Opponent Network (2000–2001); Sierra Entertainment (2001–2007)
- Platform: PC (Windows)
- Release: 1997 (public beta)
- Genre: Action
- Mode: Multiplayer

Attack Retrieve Capture (ARC) was a free multiplayer, 2D computer game created by John Vechey and Brian Fiete, who would go on to co-found PopCap Games, as a college project and was later published by Hoopy Entertainment in 1995. The game was primarily capture the flag (CTF), but other game modes existed. In the two-team CTF mode, each team tried to capture the other's flag(s). Players piloted small ships equipped with four types of weapons: lasers, missiles, bouncy lasers, and grenades.

== Gameplay ==
There are two to four teams (green, red, blue, and yellow). Each player pilots a ship of his or her team's color. The ships move around a plane. There are obstacles which the ships cannot pass through (walls, areas with no floor, etc.) Ships are armed with a laser and a special weapon. When the laser is fired, its power drains. Laser power returns at a constant rate.

In Capture the Flag Mode, a team wins by bringing the other team's or teams' flags to their own flagpost corresponding to the color of the flag. A team may have multiple flags. There are also neutral flags, which are white. A player carrying a flag moves more slowly than normal; also, he or she cannot use a teleporter or move "against" a conveyor belt.

If a player drops a team flag (not white), a player from that team or another opposing team can pick up the flag after a few seconds. If a player touches their own dropped flag or the flag is left alone for a certain time, the flag is returned to its home post immediately. Neutral flags do not return by themselves.

In Switch Mode or button Mode, the map has one or more switches on it. A player claims a switch for their team by touching it. A team wins by gaining control of all the switches.

In Deathmatch Mode there are no team objectives. Players only attempt to kill each other to gain a high score.

== History ==
Initially ARC was hosted on a server rented out by Hoopy at Ulink.net, an internet service provider in Sacramento, California. Clients ran it via HFront (Hoopy Front End), a program downloaded to serve as the game to support multiplayer mode. The original developers of ARC, John Vechey (jv) and Brian Fiete (bf), took ARC to Total Entertainment Network (TEN) (now pogo.com) in 1998 for its 1.0 release. In 1999, TEN went under and ARC appeared to go with it. But by December 1999, World Opponent Network (WON) had acquired ARC and began to run another beta test. During this time, WON attempted to make ARC a source of income, by adding advertisements into the game interface. However, the idea never got off the ground, and WON suffered the same fate as TEN in 2001. The future of ARC was again uncertain, but Sierra Entertainment bought WON which included ARC. This kept ARC going under much the same operation as WON had. A few updates were added to ARC but these were only security fixes. In 2002, development was handed to a community member with the alias Err0r. Err0r resigned on April 21, 2005 handing the lead administrator role over to Goose and Sonique, who were Co-Lead Administrators until Sierra eventually terminated ARC.

In recent years, a devoted community has made efforts to revive the game by rebuilding its engine. These updated versions of the original game have been released under the names "Spark" and, most recently, "Armor Critical"

=== Termination ===
On July 16, 2007, Sierra Entertainment posted a news release on their website expressing intentions to terminate multiplayer support for several Sierra Heritage titles (including ARC) as of August 16, 2007.

== Reception ==
Christ Centered Gamer gave ARC an overall rating of B.
