= Lottso! =

Bingo-type online game

Lottso! is a game offered by the website Pogo.com. It is a blend of Bingo and a Lottery. Its outcome usually is decided by luck, although players can develop certain strategies to win the game.

== The game ==
Lottso! is usually played by a number of players that varies between 2 and 20, but a player can sit by themselves and play the game as well. There is a triangle, similar to those used to play billiards, that comes on the screen, with six numbers, five numbers and a star or four numbers and two stars. There are three tickets containing numbers to each side of the game screen.

The purpose of the game is to place the numbers inside the triangle in the tickets that have matching numbers, to fill out the tickets. All tickets that get filled help the player obtain points, but some tickets are better than others. Practically all of the tickets feature themes from other games available on the Pogo website. The most valuable tickets are Aces Up and Pop Fu. The least valuable tickets are Harvest Mania, Squelchies, and Jigsaw Detective. There are also Team Lottso tickets which can vary in value from 50 to 500 depending on how many additional players in the room complete a Team Lottso ticket. Players can also choose to play in competitive rooms where the Team Lottso ticket is unavailable. The Lottso ticket itself has a changing value depending on how often it is scratched during the game, typically never going higher than 550 in a full room.

Most tickets are scratch tickets. These allow the player to keep scoring until a stop sign is scratched on the ticket. The player keeps the points scored regardless that the negative sign has come. Other tickets are match tickets. Match tickets allow a player to look for a high number of points, but can also give players a low score. When a player matches one number, that number of points is given to the contestant.

Ten rounds consisting of 25 seconds each are played. The winners get rewards in the shape of tokens, which can be used to purchase entries into the various Pogo prize drawings or to edit a player's Pogo Mini. The winner is that contestant with the most points scored after ten rounds. Players who score over 3000 in a game receive a jackpot spin for more tokens or prizes. Players advance rank in Lottso by placing balls on cards during the game. There are 100 ranks in the game with badges awarded at various ranks.

== Strategy ==
Unlike bingo, where a number can be played on all cards the player is playing, in Lottso! a ball can only be played once. This adds a lot of strategy to the game.

Knowing which cards are worth the most points and clearing them first is important to winning the game. A player should play wild numbers on a number they need the most of. In team play, a Team Lottso! card can be worth anywhere from 50 to 500 points depending on how many other players play a Team Lottso! card in the same round; a shrewd player plays the Team Lottso! card when it is worth the most points. Also note that just because a card is filled does not mean it needs to be scratched, players can hold onto this card until a round where it is "flashing", which will multiply the points it is worth. Flashing cards begin showing up in round 6, with the total multiplied by a factor of two until round 9 where the total is multiplied by three.

Another strategy is to get the Super Lottso Card. The easiest way of getting the card is to wait until all the cards in one row are filled, before scratching them to get the points. This way the whole row will empty in one round, and the Super Lottso Card will drop down for the next round. Another way to get a Super Lottso Card is to have a Fire Card stay at the top of the stack, and wait 3 turns.

== Variations ==
There are various variations of the game Lottso!. Electronic Arts released a PC version named "Lottso! Deluxe" in 2007, while another version is named "Lottso! Express HD".
