= Tiger Woods PGA Tour 2002 =

2002 video game

- Developers: Headgate Studios (PC); EA Redwood Shores (PS2); Rebellion Developments (GBA)
- Publisher: EA Sports
- Series: PGA Tour
- Platforms: Microsoft Windows, PlayStation 2, Game Boy Advance
- Release: Microsoft Windows: NA: February 26, 2002; EU: May 31, 2002; PlayStation 2: NA: February 26, 2002; EU: July 5, 2002; Game Boy Advance: NA: May 29, 2002; EU: August 2, 2002
- Genre: Sports
- Modes: Single-player, multiplayer

Tiger Woods PGA Tour 2002 (also known as Tiger Woods PGA Tour Golf for the Game Boy Advance version) is a sports video game, developed by Headgate Studios for the Microsoft Windows and PlayStation 2 versions and Rebellion Developments for the GBA version, and published by EA Sports in 2002. It was the first edition of the series released for the Game Boy Advance.

== Reception ==
Reception

Aggregate score
Aggregator	Score		
Aggregator	GBA	PC	PS2
Metacritic	64/100	83/100	80/100

Review scores
Publication	Score		
Publication	GBA	PC	PS2
AllGame	N/A	N/A	3/5
Electronic Gaming Monthly	N/A	N/A	7/10
Eurogamer	N/A	N/A	9/10
Game Informer	N/A	N/A	7.75/10
GamePro	N/A	N/A	3.5/5
GameSpot	N/A	8.2/10	8.1/10
GameSpy	N/A	N/A	86%
GameZone	N/A	8/10	8.5/10
IGN	6/10	8.2/10	8/10
Nintendo Power	2.2/5	N/A	N/A
Official U.S. PlayStation Magazine	N/A	N/A	4/5
PC Gamer (US)	N/A	79%	N/A
BBC Sport	N/A	N/A	84%
FHM	N/A	N/A	4/5

The PC and PlayStation 2 versions received "favorable" reviews, while the Game Boy Advance version received "mixed" reviews according to video game review aggregator Metacritic.
