= The Realm Online =

1996 video game

- The Realm Online, Yosemite Entertainment / Sierra On-Line (1997) Demo CD Artwork
- Developers: Sierra On-Line (1995-1999), Codemasters (2000-2003), Norseman Games (2003-2018), Rat Labs / Realm Worlds (2018-2023), Digital Alchemy (2023-present)
- Publishers: Sierra On-Line (1996-1998), World Opponent Network (1998-1999), Codemasters (1999-2003), Norseman Games (2003-2023), Virtual World Holding Company (2023-present)
- Designers: Stephen Nichols, Jordan Neville, Gil
- Engine: Sierra Creative Interpreter
- Platform: Windows
- Release: NA: 1996; EU: 1996; JP: 1996
- Genre: MMORPG
- Mode: Multiplayer

The Realm Online, originally known as The Realm, is a long-running massively multiplayer online role playing game (MMORPG) initially launched by Sierra On-Line in December 1996 for Windows PC. It was designed in the tradition of graphical MUDs, before the usage of the terms "massively multiplayer" and "MMORPG". Since launch, The Realm has been online through the game server Despothes' Grove (1996) followed by three fresh start servers: Finvarra's Fortress (2018), Elphame's Arena (2021), and Mabon's Gamble (2023).

== History ==
=== Development ===
The Realm was greenlit in 1994 during negotiations for Sierra's sale of the ImagiNation Network (INN) online social gaming service to AT&T with the expectation that it would be included in the sale. However, INN canceled this agreement because they perceived The Realm as a direct competitor to their planned CyberPark online world. Sierra co-founder and CEO Ken Williams advocated for the continued development of The Realm.

Development for The Realm began in 1995 at Sierra's original design facility in Oakhurst, California alongside classic single-player titles like Quest for Glory and Police Quest. Sierra initially solicited The Coles to design The Realm as an online adaptation of Quest for Glory, but this plan was not further pursued. Development was led by David Slayback and Stephen Nichols, who had previously worked on games for the pioneering internet gaming platform The Sierra Network. Slayback departed the project in 1996 due to the emphasis on violence in the game. Development continued led by Stephen Nichols and Janus Anderson.

The Realm was conceived as an online adaptation of Sierra's single-player point and click adventure games with an emphasis on expanding the adventure game inventory system into an interactive trading system. The game was developed using Sierra's SCI (Sierra Creative Interpreter) environment.

The Realm features artwork by Sierra's in-house artists including Richard Powell, who had previously worked on games including Space Quest and Gabriel Knight and music by composer Chance Thomas. The cel-animation style artwork was drawn by hand and digitally scanned.

=== Release ===
Beta testing for The Realm took place in 1996 and Sierra began offering paid subscriptions in 1997. The game was never released to retail outlets and was not widely advertised. Instead, Sierra built an initial player base through bundled demo discs and a demo installer distributed through the Realm's website.

The Realm was then distributed through Sierra's World Opponent Network service before being abandoned due to its unfavorable comparison to popular competitors like Ultima Online and EverQuest. The Realm was sold to Codemasters in late 1999, who rebranded the game as The Realm Online. Nichols continued to lead development under Codemasters.

In 2003, Codemasters sold the game to Norseman Games, a family-owned company based in Grand Rapids, Michigan led by a former player of The Realm. Hoping to cultivate a regional game industry in Michigan, Norseman continued development of The Realm Online with Digital Animation and Game Design undergraduate students at Ferris State University under the leadership of Norseman's Scott Wochholz. Norseman's plans to revise the game did not materialize, but it remained online and open to new subscribers.

In 2017, Norseman Games organized a crowdfunding campaign with support from players and developers in The Realm's unlicensed private server community, who operated an unofficial updated version of the game. In 2018, Norseman granted an exclusive license to develop and distribute The Realm Online to Rat Labs, a company led by players who had previously operated the private server. Rat Labs published an official fresh start server in 2018 featuring new content, bug fixes, and events.

In 2023, Rat Labs (by then renamed as Realm Worlds) announced that they had unsuccessfully attempted to negotiate the purchase of The Realm Online from Norseman Games and that the game server they had developed would close. It then became public that Norseman Games had sold The Realm to Virtual Worlds Holding Company, who licensed the game to be developed by Digital Alchemy. Digital Alchemy published a new game server in November 2023.

== Gameplay ==
The Realm Online was designed to combine the animated visual environments and inventories of Sierra's point-and-click adventure games with the role-playing mechanisms of MUDs. The game features a high fantasy setting inspired by Dungeons & Dragons and The Lord of the Rings. Gameplay takes place in discrete rooms, which are organized into dungeons, forests and towns.

Players choose the gender, race (elf, giant, or human), and class (warrior, adventurer, wizard, or thief) during character creation. Players also customize the visual appearance of their character, including detailed facial features, hairstyle, skin color, and body size. The game has been criticized for its unforgiving character creation: a character that hasn't been created optimally can't reach maximum potential.

Players gain experience points and levels by fighting enemies and earn build points that are spent on magic and weapon skill levels. The Realm Online uses turn-based combat, which makes it different from other MUDs of its generation, and is convenient for players with a bad Internet connection. Sierra highlighted the game's interoperability with third-party accessibility software for disabled players. It has been credited to be the first virtual world to use instances, with every battle taking place in a special room outside of the open world.

The in-game economy is organized around the scarcity of rare items dropped by enemies. The game lacks an interface for trading and requires players to directly drag and drop items from their inventories to other players to facilitate trading, making traders vulnerable to scams. Because of this, players of The Realm self-organize to build trust and hire trusted players to perform intermediary roles within trades. Players also organize in-game auctions using chat channels.

The Realm emphasizes exploration and player interaction over scripted narrative storytelling and includes multiple channels for social interaction including private messages and chat rooms. Sierra emphasized The Realm's balance of gameplay and social interaction, describing it as "vast, multinational community" in which players from different age groups, cultures, and professions could connect. Each player begins the game with their own house, which other players may visit. According to lead designer Stephen Nichols, The Realm was purposefully designed to support a range of cooperative and adversarial social interactions ranging from organizing in-game guilds to house theft and pickpocketing. The Realm was launched without any customer service tools, leading the small customer service team to develop in-game counter-measures to moderate griefers.

== Popularity ==
In the game's first year, 25,000 user accounts had been made, representing approximately 30% of the nascent MMO market otherwise dominated by Ultima Online. The Realm's 2D graphics were unfavorably compared with 3D games like EverQuest. Subscriptions dropped to 6000 accounts by 2004. In 2008, the server would still reach an online population of 100 to 200 players during peak hours and has since returned to these numbers with the release of the free to play version of the server.
