= Nerf N-Strike =

2008 video game

- North American Wii cover art
- Developer: EA Salt Lake
- Publisher: Electronic Arts
- Designer: Kyle Pew
- Composer: James Dooley
- Platform: Wii
- Release: NA: October 28, 2008; AU: February 12, 2009; EU: February 20, 2009
- Genre: Rail shooter
- Modes: Single-player, multiplayer

Nerf N-Strike is a video game developed by EA Salt Lake and published by Electronic Arts for the Wii. The game is a rail shooter played from a first-person perspective, and focuses on the Nerf line of toy dart blasters. It has an optional unique blaster for gameplay called the Nerf Switch Shot EX-3, that can either be used as a real Nerf blaster, or to play the video game. The game uses various blasters created in real life by Nerf.

A sequel, Nerf N-Strike Elite, was released a year later. Both games were compiled in the 2010 release Nerf N-Strike Double Blast Bundle.

== Reception ==
Reception

Aggregate score
Aggregator	Score
Metacritic	66/100

Review scores
Publication	Score
IGN	7.1/10
Nintendo Life	6/10
Official Nintendo Magazine	73%

Nerf N-Strike received mixed reviews from critics. On Metacritic, the game holds a score of 66/100 based on 13 reviews. The game received praise for its included blaster, but was criticized for being short and easy as a result of its intended audience being children.

== See also ==
- N-Strike – the Nerf Blaster line that inspired this video game.
- Nerf N-Strike Elite – the 2009 sequel.
- Nerf Arena Blast – the 1999 first-person shooter by Hasbro Interactive.
