= Total Entertainment Network =

T E Network, Inc.
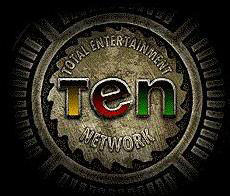
- Predecessors: Optigon Interactive; Outland
- Founded: June 1995; 31 years ago
- Successor: Pogo.com, Inc.
- Headquarters: San Francisco, California, United States

Total Entertainment Network (TEN) was an online gaming service first launched in 1995. It acquired Outland in 1996, before ceasing operations in October, 1997.

== History ==
Total Entertainment Network was the first online gaming provider to go live. Operating out of San Francisco, the service allowed games for MS-DOS and Windows to be online with and against other players, and let players chat and download game-related content. The service was bundled with many PC games and offered as a subscription service. The games supported on TEN include Duke Nukem 3D, NASCAR Racing Online Series, Quake, Command & Conquer, Panzer General, and Big Red Racing.

Many online games, especially PC games adapted for online game play, require low and consistent latency to play well. It was a major challenge circa 1996 for consumers to find consistent low-latency connections to central servers or to other game players because of the latency intrinsic to dial-up modems and the heavy congestion at the Internet peering points. T E Network, Inc. partnered with Concentric Network Corporation to offer consumers Internet access dial-up numbers that would provide the reliable low latencies they needed to play online games. Concentric optimized their network and their dial-up technology for the TEN service. Concentric also received venture capital financing from Kleiner Perkins Caufield & Byers.

Even with the combined revenues of subscriptions and advertising, TEN remained unprofitable, failing to reach the critical mass numbers of subscribers needed to cover their costs. After the success of Blizzard Entertainment's free Battle.net service for Diablo and their claim that offering online play as a feature of the game boosted retail sales by 10%, PC game publishers started following Blizzard's lead and offering free online game play. This undermined the subscription business model of TEN and their strategy to be the exclusive place to play popular PC games online. As Internet advertising was starting to gain traction, T E Network decided to focus on easy-to-access and easy-to-play browser-based games that would appeal to a broad audience and attract enough unique users to drive an advertising-based business model. T E Network, Inc. became Pogo.com, Inc. to pursue this new strategy.

Advertisement for TEN when you close the game, Duke Nukem 3D Atomic Edition.

== TEN games ==
- AD&D's Dark Sun Online
- Attack Retrieve Capture (ARC)
- Big Red Racing
- Blood
- Command & Conquer
- Command & Conquer: Red Alert
- Dark Sun Online: Crimson Sands
- Deadlock: Planetary Conquest
- Diablo
- Duke Nukem 3D and add-ons
- EF2000
- Magic: The Gathering Online
- Master of Orion II
- Myth
- NASCAR Racing Online Series
- Necrodome
- Panzer General
- Quake
- Quake 2
- Shadow Warrior
- Total Annihilation
- Twilight Lands
- WarCraft
- Warheads
- Wiz-War
- Wulfram

== Earlier Total Entertainment Network service from Optigon Interactive ==
The first Total Entertainment Network (TEN) service was an online gaming network and community portal developed by Optigon Interactive. Optigon Interactive was founded by Daniel Goldman and Janice Linden-Reed in 1991. They registered TEN.NET and launched a beta nationally in 1994 via Sprint's X.25 dial-up network. The brand was developed in conjunction with Alan Buder, from Colossal Picture, and Michael Lipscomb. It was an online service with a DOS client that offered Chess, Checkers, Descent and other two-player PC games, WizWar, SimCity, email, and chat[1].

In 1996 TEN hosted a first of its kind, nationally participated in "online tournament" rewarding the champions with cash and prizes sparking an immediate surge in online gaming. Some of the first prizes were $500 cash and a lifetime membership to the service. The only Duke tournament was won by one of the first cyber athletes, Christopher S Carpentier, aka "Creamator", who battled over 14 thousand entries to claim the title of “One True Duke!” Most of these newly declared cyber athletes later went on to the PGL "Professional Gamers League" after TEN converted its business model to Pogo. Organizations like the PGL enhanced the awards, and in 1997 Dennis Fong, also known as Thresh, a professional gamer, won John Carmack's Ferrari at the Red Annihilation tournament. During his career as a professional gamer, it is believed that he made over US$100,000 in endorsements alone.

== Closure ==
The Total Entertainment Network changed it name in 1999 after TEN management neglected to secure TEN.com, and Kleiner Perkin mistakenly linked to what was then billed at the leading adult entertainment network on the internet: The Entertainment Netork. With the departure of Jack Heistand the TEN was able to get back to its community based gamer roots, which both Optigon and Outland had focused on <ref>The History of TEN</reg> Khosla, the lead investor, intended for TEN to get acquired by Excite, where he had a larger share. However, Excite.com went bankrupt, TEN, now rebranded as Pogo, was acquired by Electronic Arts in 2001. The history of Total Entertainment Network can still be explored and viewed at .

== See also ==
- Pogo.com
