= NFL Football Pro '99 =

1998 video game

- Developer: Sierra On-Line
- Publisher: Sierra Sports
- Series: Front Page Sports Football
- Platform: Windows
- Release: NA: December 22, 1998
- Genre: Sports
- Modes: Single player, multiplayer

NFL Football Pro '99 is a sports video game featuring American football teams from the National Football League (NFL) developed and published by Sierra On-Line for Microsoft Windows in 1998. It is part of the Front Page Sports Football series.

== Development, release, and recall ==
Sierra announced that it was retiring the Front Page Sports logo while upgrading graphics with an all-new 3D engine (at the time it was developed). The game was eventually released on December 22, 1998. However, due to a number of complaints addressing too many flaws, glitches, and bugs in the system, the game was recalled on January 20, 1999. Sierra president David Grenewetzki released the following statement:

"I want to apologize to all our loyal customers for releasing a product before it was ready. We came through 1998 with one great product after another only to stumble on virtually the last title we shipped in the year. We knew the potential for this product but we let the impending end of the football season influence our decision process. We figuratively 'dropped the ball' [...] Sierra Sports, like all Sierra divisions, is dedicated to producing the highest quality products possible. With this recall action we hope we can convey our intention to do right by our customers."

Sierra also stated that it would do a better job starting with the release of NFL Football Pro 2000 in 1999. However, said game was eventually cancelled in February 1999.

== Reception ==
PC Accelerator gave the game a score of zero, calling it "the worst piece of sports software we have ever seen in a shrink-wrapped box. It should never have left the building, and the decision to send it out to stores will stick with Sierra Sports for the next few years. And deservedly so." Computer Games Magazine refused a review, instead writing an article detailing its bugs, highlighting the odd plays which included many field goal formations but few pass plays.
