= PGA Championship Golf 2000 =

2000 video game

- Developer: Headgate Studios
- Publisher: Sierra Sports
- Platform: Windows
- Release: NA: June 6, 2000; UK: August 25, 2000
- Genre: Sports
- Mode: Single-player

PGA Championship Golf 2000 is a golf simulation game for Windows. It was developed by Headgate Studios and released by Sierra Sports. It follows PGA Championship Golf 1999 Edition. An upgraded version was released in December 2000, under the title PGA Championship Golf Titanium Edition.

== Gameplay ==
The game features 13 courses, including 8 from PGA Championship Golf 1999 Edition. Features of the game include tour play, and several versions of play used to score golf including match play and stableford. There is a community of players who visit Golf Sim Clubhouse to discuss the game on a forum and meet up to play online. Over 1,600 user created courses are also available for download and designers can upload new courses to the site.

== Development and release ==
PGA Championship Golf 2000 was developed by Headgate Studios and published by Sierra Sports. It is an upgraded version of its predecessor, with improvements focusing on various aspects such as game physics and the TrueSwing. Each of the courses from the previous game received graphical updates for the 2000 edition, except for the Jocassee Shoals course. For the Course Architect, new structures were added, including additional bridges, walls, and buildings, as well as more trees and other objects. Other changes include new camera modes.

Brian Silvernail designed the game's Canaveral Dunes course. Silvernail was well known for his online golf course designs, which he would create using the course designers that came with the Jack Nicklaus games. Despite the title, the game does not include any professional PGA golfers. The development team had looked into licensing professional golfers for the game, but determined that players were more interested in other game features. The development team had a significant amount of work to do on the game and had a limited schedule to achieve it.

The game was announced in March 2000. Sierra began searching for beta testers in April 2000, and announced the completion of the game on May 9, 2000. The game was released in North America on June 6, 2000, and a patch was released two months later. The game was also released in the United Kingdom on August 25, 2000. An upgraded version with seven new courses, titled PGA Championship Golf Titanium Edition, was released in December 2000. It was followed by PGA Championship Golf Collector's Edition, announced in June 2001 and scheduled for release later that year.

== Reception ==
Reception

Aggregate score
Aggregator	Score
GameRankings	88%

Review scores
Publication	Score
Computer Games Strategy Plus	4.5/5
Computer Gaming World	5/5
Eurogamer	9/10
GameSpot	8.9/10
GameSpy	90/100
IGN	7.7/10
PC Format	88%
PC Gamer (US)	91%
PC Zone	84%
Gamecenter	8/10
Sports Gaming Network	90/100

PGA Championship Golf 2000 has a score of 88 percent on GameRankings. Tom Ham, writing for The Washington Post, stated "the scenery here is top-notch--but the spectators still look like cardboard cutouts." Dave Perrett of PC Format praised the variety of gameplay options.
