= Pogo.com =

Web based video gaming service

- Screenshot of Pogo.com as of November 2009
- Available in: English
- Owner: Electronic Arts (2001–present)
- Website: www.pogo.com
- Registration: Optional
- Launched: September 1, 1998; 28 years ago
- Written in: HTML

Pogo.com (stylized as pogo) is a free online gaming website that offers over 50 casual games from brands like Hasbro and PopCap Games. It offers a variety of card and board games to puzzle, sports and word games. It is owned by Electronic Arts and is based in Redwood Shores, California.

The website is free due to advertising sponsorships but during a game, it produces commercials that can last up to 20 seconds. Players are strongly encouraged to sign up for Club Pogo, a subscription service. The enticement to do so is the offer of premium benefits and the omission of the advertisements that would otherwise interrupt the games. Games are played in a browser with the Java-plugin and more recently HTML5. Games load in a "room" allowing other players to join and chat.

Players can win tokens from playing the games on Pogo.com. Players can place bets of tokens on some games, such as Texas hold 'em poker and High Stakes poker. Cash (in the form of pre-paid credit cards) and merchandise prizes are available to U.S. and Canadian residents, excluding Quebec.

Pogo also offers downloadable games, often "deluxe" or "to go" versions of already-released games, which can be bought and played while offline. Some of these downloadable games include chat and tokens, similar to the original games.

== Corporate history ==
=== Creation ===
Optigon Interactive launched a beta of the "Total Entertainment Network" in 1994. The T.E. Network, Inc, which became Pogo.com was created in 1995 from the merger of two predecessor companies, Optigon Interactive (founded by Daniel Goldman and Janice Linden-Reed) and Outland (founded by Dave King, Bill Lipa, and Alex Beltramo), in conjunction with investment from Kleiner Perkins Caufield & Byers led by partner Vinod Khosla. The original grand vision of the company was to become a hip, young version of CompuServe - a dial-up service for the MTV generation. Optigon had already launched a beta dial-in service along these lines with some simple games but also with other content. Much of the early hiring was therefore focused on editorial staff for content such as comics and music designed to appeal to that demographic and this was reflected in the grandiose name "Total Entertainment Network." The first major strategic change to come from the merger was not the decision to focus on games exclusively or even low latency games but rather the decision to abandon the dial-in model which was so successful for AOL and instead to create an internet-based service available to anyone with a TCP/IP connection.

=== Total Entertainment Network (1995–1998) ===
T.E. Network's first major service was a newly designed version of the Total Entertainment Network (TEN), which it launched in 1996. While the brand remained the same, the feature set was a subset of Optigon's version of TEN, with the addition of features related to low latency game play. T.E. Network entered additional partnerships with major game developers, and offered gamers a way to play their favorite games with other people across the country. TEN was an immediate success among the hardcore gaming community. The service's initial flagship game was Duke Nukem, and SSI's DarkSun RPG found a solid following on TEN. Ultimately the most popular title would be NASCAR Racing Online, with peak simultaneous usage of about 1700 people.

After the success of Blizzard's free Battle.net service for Diablo and their claim that offering online play as a feature of the game boosted retail sales by 10%, PC game publishers started following Blizzard's lead and offering free online game play and/or building matchmaking functions directly into the game (e.g. Quake II). This undermined the subscription business model of TEN and its strategy to be the exclusive place to play popular PC games online. In addition, TEN's revenue model suffered from the fact that its largest direct competitor Mplayer.com decided to abandon paid subscriptions and moved to a purely ad-supported free play model. With the failure of TEN to reach a critical mass of players, the company needed a new business model and offering to survive.

=== Pogo.com (1998–present) ===
The company found success with its second major service: a web offering that would become pogo.com. As Internet advertising was starting to gain traction, the company decided to focus on easy-to-access and easy-to-play browser-based games that would appeal to a broad audience and attract enough unique users to drive an advertising-based business model. The corporate strategy shifted from acquiring exclusive game content to securing exclusive distribution relationship, while the client platform changed from a Windows executable to a browser-based java applet. Excite was their first partner. T.E. Network acquired Michael Riccio's WebDeck service, which offered Java-based versions of Euchre, Spades, and Hearts that ran in the popular web browsers circa 1998, to accelerate this transition.

In July 1998, the company launched this web-based offering as "Excite Games by TEN" and built a large audience by offering co-branded browser-based games to many of the portals available in 1998. The Pogo.com brand was launched on September 1, 1999, and the company renamed itself to Pogo.com. Pogo grew quickly, eventually outpacing its competition to become the "stickiest game site on the Internet." according to a company press release.

Although the site was popular by late 2000, the Dot-Com bubble was bursting for most startup companies, and cash was very tight. Pogo.com entered into a deal to be purchased by then popular web portal Excite@Home Network, also a Kleiner Perkins Caufield & Byers/Vinod Khosla investment. However Excite was having problems of its own and heading for bankruptcy. When AT&T took control of the Excite@Home board, they aborted the acquisition.

In March 2020, Pogo discontinued all Flash games following the end of Flash support. However, several of these games were later revived using the new HTML5 format.

=== Electronic Arts acquisition ===
In March 2001, Electronic Arts (EA) purchased Pogo.com for approximately $40 million.

Some of their distributions partners included Excite, WebCrawler, Netscape's Netcenter, Prodigy, GeoCities, CNET, Snap.com, Road Runner, Go, @Home Network, AltaVista, Sony Station, XOOM, and iVillage.

== Club Pogo ==
Launched in 2003, Club Pogo is Pogo.com's premium subscription-based service. Perks to subscribers include exclusive members-only rooms, no ad interruptions, graphic emoticons (smileys) (discontinued), private chat, "Pogo Minis" (avatars) (which later became available to free Pogo members), double jackpot spins (discontinued), and access to full content in-game. Exclusive Club Pogo games include Jungle Gin, Canasta, Bookworm, Pogo Addiction Solitaire, Tri-Peaks Solitaire and Crazy Cakes 2. Club Pogo members can also earn Badges by completing challenges in various games. There are several types of badges, including weekly badges, personal challenges and Premium badges (that can be purchased for an additional cost). In addition to this, subscribers also get access to site wide events and the new Seasons that grant you Pogis (points) for the specific challenges you complete. Most of the new games Pogo features require players to buy (with gems purchased with the player's money) powerups in order to progress faster.

=== Club Pogo UK ===
On September 25, 2007, Pogo launched Club Pogo UK. Pogo members in the UK are now able to purchase Pogo Gems, Mix-n-Match badges and Premium Mini items and win other prizes in British currency (£), whereas previously they were unobtainable, though this fact was never made clear by Pogo games until now. UK players are still unable to gain access to some parts of Pogo, such as Scrabble for example. Members of Club Pogo in the UK have become part of the Founders Club on the launch date and were able to claim a new Founders Club badge as well as a surprise gift. Two days after the launch on September 27, several new Pogo Mini items were released with a British theme. On September 25, 2008, on the first anniversary of club Pogo UK, the winning entry in a competition to design a Mini item was released: The very 'English Seaside' attire of 'Rolled-up Trousers' and 'Knotted Hanky'. P.O.G.O UK was closed down on 21 May 2013.

== Former Games and Options ==
Until 2019, Pogo.com players could also win jackpot prizes from playing games. An original format included all-in game jackpots. On February 8, 2011, Pogo.com switched to a new prize format awarding individual prizes that varied based on cash amount or prize items such as video games, coffee mugs, etc. Pogo also had daily, weekly, or monthly sweepstakes drawings that players could sign up for. Tokens were removed from sweepstakes drawings in 2010 before the sweepstakes were discontinued altogether in 2019.

Pogo included several Adobe Flash games over the years, such as Monopoly, Authentic Boggle Bash, Yahtzee Party, High Stakes Poker, Dominos, Lottso!, Bingo, Dice Derby, KenoPop, Shuffle Bump, High Stakes Pool, Clue: Secrets & Spies, Squelchies, Poppit Sprint, Boardwalk Sea Ball, Blackjack Carnival, Ride The Tide, Hearts, Quick Quack, Pop Fu, Risk, Swashbucks, Casino Island Blackjack, Perfect Pair Solitaire, Makeover Madness, Penguin Blocks, Flower Daze, Wonderland Memories, Omaha Poker, Harvest Mania, Balloon Bounce, Slingo Blast, Panda Pai Gow Poker, several Slot Games and others were all removed from the site. These games were removed from Pogo.com due to Flash's discontinuation in 2020.

As of 2022 Pogo now mainly consists of single player solitaire games, Word Find, Mahjong and Hidden Object games, a significant change from what once was offered. Players lost Purchased Badges, purchased avatar extras, tournament options, gift giving, prizes and Tokens earned/purchased from the original Pogo site are unusable.

== Other Platforms ==
=== Facebook ===
The Pogo Games Facebook application beta was released in March 2010. The application features 20+ Pogo titles that can be played within Facebook and includes features such as challenges, leaderboards and achievements. Like Pogo.com, the Facebook App is free to play with advertisements. Club Pogo members play without advertisements and receive additional bonus and features.

=== iPhone/iPod Touch ===
On December 7, 2010, Pogo launched the Pogo Games application for iPhone and iPod touch. The app reached number one in free games immediately following its release. The Pogo Games app contains mobile versions of five Pogo games at launch: Poppit!, Word Whomp, Sweet Tooth 2, Mahjong Safari and Turbo 21. A sixth game, Phlinx was added with the version 1.1 update in February 2011. World Class Solitaire was added in May 2011 with a UI refresh on all the games. The Application is free to play with advertisements. Club Pogo members can sign in and play without ads, and an ads-free version of the application can be unlocked with a purchase of $20.99.

=== iPad ===
Pogo released CLUE: Secrets and Spies, a hidden object game for the iPad in November 2010.

=== Android ===
Pogo Games App has been released for Android devices with some differences. Mahjong Safari and Phlinx are not available for play, while jackpot spins have been disabled. World Class Solitaire can only be played when logged into a Club Pogo account. There is also no one-time fee to remove ads, you either sign-in as a Club Pogo member (Internet connection required) or play free with ads. (See iPhone/iPod Touch for more info on the app)
