= Arista Records, LLC v. Launch Media, Inc =

American legal case

Arista Records, LLC v. Launch Media, Inc.
- Court: United States Court of Appeals for the Second Circuit
- Full case name: ARISTA RECORDS, LLC, formerly known as Arista Records, Inc., Bad Boy Records, BMG Music, doing business as the RCA Record Label and Zomba Recording LLC, formerly known as Zomba Recording Corporation, Plaintiffs-Appellants, Capitol Records, Inc., Virgin Records America, Inc., Sony Music Entertainment, Inc., UMG Recordings Inc., Interscope Records and Motown Records Company L.P., Plaintiffs v. LAUNCH MEDIA, INC., Defendant-Appellee.
- Argued: March 17, 2009
- Decided: August 21 2009
- Citation: 578 F.3d 148

Holding
- Affirmed. In favor of Defendant-Appellee Launch Media, Inc.

Court membership
- Judges sitting: Guido Calabresi, Richard C. Wesley, Christopher F. Droney (District Judge)

Arista Records, LLC v. LAUNCH Media, Inc., 578 F.3d 148 (2d Cir. N.Y. 2009), is a legal case brought by Arista Records, LLC, Bad Boy Records, BMG Music, and Zomba Recording LLC (collectively, "BMG") alleging that the webcasting service provided by LAUNCH Media, Inc. ("Launch") willfully infringed BMG's sound recording copyrights. The lawsuit concerns the scope of the statutory term "interactive service" codified in 17 U.S.C. § 114, as amended by the Digital Millennium Copyright Act of 1998 ("DMCA"). If the webcasting service is an interactive service, Launch would be required to pay individual licensing fees to BMG's sound recording copyright holders; otherwise, Launch only need to pay "a statutory licensing fee set by the Copyright Royalty Board."

The United States Court of Appeals for the Second Circuit affirmed the trial court's judgment and ruled in favor of Launch, finding that the webcasting service provided by Launch does not fall within the scope of the definition of an interactive service as a matter of law.

== Background ==
Launch operates an internet radio website by providing a webcasting service (LAUNCHcast), "which enables a user to create 'stations' that play songs that are within a particular genre or similar to a particular artist or song the user selects." The parties did not materially dispute how LAUNCHcast worked. LAUNCHcast is now known as Yahoo! Music Radio. BMG holds the copyrights in the sound recordings of some of the songs played on the service for users, and has the exclusive right "to perform the copyrighted [sound recording] publicly by means of a digital audio transmission."

== Trial court proceedings ==
On May 24, 2001, BMG brought suit, in the United States District Court for the Southern District of New York, against Launch alleging that Launch violated provisions of the DMCA, codified in relevant part in 17 U.S.C. § 114, by providing an interactive service and therefore willfully infringing sound recording copyrights of BMG from November 1999 to May 2001. The district court charged the jury with determining whether LAUNCHcast was an interactive service within the meaning of 17 U.S.C. § 114(j)(7). The jury returned a verdict in favor of Launch.

== Issue ==
Whether a webcasting service that provides users with individualized internet radio stations in this case is an interactive service within the meaning of 17 U.S.C. § 114.

== Ruling of the court of appeal ==
On March 17, 2009, BMG appealed to the United States Court of Appeals for the Second Circuit, arguing that LAUNCHcast is an interactive service as a matter of law. On August 21, 2009, the Court of Appeal confirmed the lower court decision, ruling that the webcasting service was not an interactive service as a matter of law.

"Based on a review of how LAUNCHcast functions, it is clear that LAUNCHcast does not provide a specially created program within the meaning of § 114(j)(7) because the webcasting service does not provide sufficient control to users such that playlists are so predictable that users will choose to listen to the webcast in lieu of purchasing music, thereby - in the aggregate - diminishing record sales."

== Discussions of interactive service ==
According to the statute, an interactive service "is one that enables a member of the public to receive a transmission of a program specially created for the recipient, or on request, a transmission of a particular sound recording, whether or not as part of a program, which is selected by or on behalf of the recipient." Therefore, the webcasting service LAUNCHcast is interactive under the statute "if a user can either (1) request - and have played - a particular sound recording, or (2) receive a transmission of a program "specially created" for the user." Since the LAUNCHcast users cannot request a particular song on demand, the first definition of interactive does not cover LAUNCHcast service. The court "emphasized that the line between an interactive and noninteractive service must reflect Congress's concern that an interactive service would allow a user to pick the songs she wanted to hear and thus vitiate any need to purchase those songs."

The primary argument at stake is whether LAUNCHcast enables the user to receive a transmission of a program "specially created" for the user. "In short, to the degree that LAUNCHcast's playlists are uniquely created for each user, that feature does not ensure predictability. Indeed, the unique nature of the playlist helps Launch ensure that it does not provide a service so specially created for the user that the user ceases to purchase music." Therefore, "[the court] cannot say LAUNCHcast falls within the scope of the DMCA's definition of an interactive service created for individual users."

== Subsequent developments ==
Certiorari was denied by the Supreme Court of the United States on January 25, 2010.

== Related cases ==
- United States v. Am. Soc'y of Composers (In re Cellco P'ship), 663 F. Supp. 2d 363 (S.D.N.Y. 2009).
- Sony BMG Music Entertainment v. Tenenbaum, No. 10-1947 (1st Cir.).

== See also ==
- Arista Records
- Arista Records LLC v. Lime Group LLC
