= Front Page Sports: Football Pro '97 =

1996 sports video game

- Developer: Synergistic Software
- Publisher: Sierra Online
- Series: Front Page Sports Football
- Platform: Microsoft Windows
- Release: NA: December 2, 1996; EU: December 1996
- Genre: Sports
- Modes: Single-player, multiplayer

Front Page Sports: Football Pro '97 is a video game developed by Synergistic Software and published by Sierra for Windows in 1996.

== Publication ==
The fifth version of the Front Page Sports Football series was the first for Windows 95. The game featured running back Barry Sanders as its cover athlete. It was immediately succeeded by Football Pro '98, of which quarterback Dan Marino was the cover athlete.

== Reception ==
Reception

Review scores
Publication	Score
Computer Gaming World	4.5/5
GameSpot	6.8/10
Next Generation	2/5

Kevin Mical hailed the game as "more than just a run-of-the-mill football game for the PC" in GameSpot. He was enthusiastic about the game's additional options, particularly the ability to take on the role of the general manager or coach as well as any player. He also found the coaching more user-friendly and the multiplayer features improved, though he commented that the player animation is choppy. A reviewer for Next Generation, in contrast, summarized it as "three or four year old DOS code clumsily retrofitted into a Windows 95 product." He noted that the game's strong points - its "hardcore football simulation", numerous customization options, and player stats - were essentially inherited from its DOS-based predecessors, meaning anyone who already had the previous year's installment had no reason to upgrade. He also complained of the windowed display, "mushy" control, and numerous bugs.
