= World Opponent Network =

Former online video game service

- Other names: Sierra Internet Gaming System (SIGS)
- Developer: Sierra On-Line
- Release: SIGS: 1996; 30 years ago; WON: April 13, 1998; 28 years ago
- Type: Online video game service; User authentication; Multiplayer; Matchmaking; Chat; Downloadable content
- License: Proprietary
- Website: won.net

Second SIGS logo

The World Opponent Network (WON or WON.net) was an online video game service, originally developed by Sierra On-Line as the Sierra Internet Gaming System (SIGS). SIGS-based and WON-based servers operated from 1996 until 2008.

WON was used by games such as Homeworld, Half-Life, Outpost 2, Star Trek: Armada, Soldier of Fortune, and Dark Reign 2, the free games Silencer and ARC, as well as the Hoyle series of casino, card and board games.

== Early development ==

SIGS began life as a prototype video game, Stock Market Challenge, in 1995. SIGS then moved onto beta testing integration into retail Sierra titles with Hoyle Blackjack in 1996. Before Christmas 1996, SIGS was built into 7 titles: Hoyle Blackjack, Hoyle Casino, Front Page Sports: Football Pro '97, Front Page Sports: Trophy Bass 2, MissionForce: CyberStorm, Power Chess, and The Time Warp of Dr. Brain.

== Business model ==
WON was offered as a free service to players who owned WON-enabled retail games, following a business model explicitly designed to mirror Blizzard Entertainment's Battle.net. Rather than charging subscription or hourly fees, WON generated revenue through in-service advertising and by driving incremental retail sales of WON-compatible titles. This approach aligned with Blizzard's strategy for Battle.net, where the service operated profitably on advertising revenue alone while boosting retail game sales by an estimated 10 percent. WON competed for users alongside other online gaming services of the era including Battle.net, MPlayer, Heat.net, and the Total Entertainment Network.

== History ==
SIGS operated from late 1996 through November 1997 and was built into about 20 Sierra titles by this time. On November 18, 1997, after Sierra was acquired by CUC International, CUC announced that they will rebrand SIGS as WON as of December 1, 1997. On December 8, 1997, the open beta of the new WON website was launched. WON left beta and was officially launched on April 13, 1998.

In an apparent effort to boost WON awareness with off-the-shelf customers, Sierra released On-Line Games: Collection Series late in 1997 that contained 12 online titles (9 WON-enabled games, 2 WON.net browser-based games, plus The Realm).

WON touted its success when it announced 750,000 members on September 2, 1998. Just 6 months later in March 1999, WON claimed to have doubled their membership to 1.5 million, along with now attracting 1% of the WWW audience for February 1999, placing them in the top 500 websites and top 10 gaming sites.

WON.net interface in Counter-Strike

WON attracted a few partnerships with significant third parties to become a multi-developer/multi-publisher service. On May 27, 1997, Sierra announced an agreement with Valve to publish and distribute Half-Life, which would bring it to WON when finally released in November 1998. On May 27, 1998, WON announced an agreement with GT Interactive and Epic MegaGames to bring Unreal to WON. On September 7, 1999, WON.net announced an agreement with Activision to bring a few of its multiplayer titles, including Soldier of Fortune, to WON.net.

In August 1999, after Sierra was acquired by Havas, Havas made WON.net its own entity. In September 1999, WON.net announced plans to enter Europe. WON.net launched in France, Germany, and the United Kingdom on February 17, 2000.

On March 29, 2000, Havas acquired PrizeCentral.com and merged it with WON.net, announced the creation of a new site to be called Flipside.com, and basically brought an end to the WON.net website as it was known. Regardless, WON.net continued on in various forms (primarily for WON-enabled games minus the Hoyle titles) including becoming action.WON.net for a period. Even as main pages continued to shift for WON-enabled games, many of the WON multiplayer servers continued to run—even adding a few new titles. The last WON-enabled title launched (not multiplayer but has an online element to it) was Caesar IV in September 2006.

Meanwhile, in 2001, Valve (which had a publishing and distribution agreement with Sierra) was secretly working on their own competing service, Steam. Sierra and Vivendi Universal (the current owner of Sierra and WON.net) did not learn of this until March 2002 when Valve announced Steam's beta release at GDC 2002. This only added to the current rift between Sierra and Valve. Shortly after the release of Steam beta, all of Valve's WON-enabled titles (Half-Life and its mods) were patched to run on Steam instead. Valve shut down the last of its WON servers on July 31, 2004.

Also in 2001, Raven Software took their popular title, Soldier of Fortune, off of WON.net and over to GameSpy instead.

Many of Sierra's long-running titles were shut down on August 16, 2007. The last of Sierra's and Activision's WON servers (now in the hands of Activision and Vivendi Games) were shut down on November 1, 2008.

Despite Valve's role as a third-party client rather than an owner, a misconception later emerged that Valve had acquired WON from Flipside.com in 2001. This claim circulated in gaming publications and online sources for years. The error gained legal significance when plaintiffs in In re Valve Antitrust Litigation (W.D. Wash. 2021) cited the supposed acquisition as foundational to their antitrust theory. In May 2024, Valve employee Erik Johnson submitted a declaration stating under oath that "Valve never acquired or owned WON." The misconception is further contradicted by the fact that Sierra/Activision continued operating WON servers until November 2008, seven years after the alleged acquisition.

== Legacy ==
While some of the WON-enabled titles moved to other online platforms after WON (see the list of WON-enabled games below), most of the 100 or so titles (depending on how expansions and Hoyle titles were counted) have been offline since their official WON servers were shut down. A few independent efforts, however, have been made to bring some of the abandoned titles back online.

=== WON2 ===
WON2 (formerly No-WON and PlanetWON2.com) is a non-commercial but closed-source project started by the Steamless CS Project Team in 2003. WON2 supports, primarily, pre-Steam versions of Half-Life and its mods. WON2 was born out of a dislike for how games were running on Steam versus WON. Even though the project began with a "Steamless" port of Counter-Strike 1.6, it appears to have lasted this long because Steam forces Counter-Strike players to run version 1.6 when many fans felt that version 1.5 was better. For example, of the 60 current servers online (April 2023), 56 of them are running Counter-Strike 1.5 (3 running Half-Life and 1 running Team Fortress).

While WON2 has a stated goal of also "focusing on other former WON games" (besides Half-Life) the only other game known to have received some attention by the project team is Silencer, but it was never launched. WON2 claims to have reached its peak popularity between 2005 and 2010 with more than 1,000 servers and up to 10,000 players at a time. As of April 2023, WON2 is still operational with around 400 players during peak hours, and the majority of the servers hosted in China. While most of the WON2 and Steamless CS Project websites are still active, the forum for the project has been down since at least August 2016.

A side project to WON2 is called "Counter-Strike Beta 6.1" which uses WON2 assets to run even earlier versions of Counter-Strike. As of April 2023, 11 servers for beta 6.1 and 1 server for beta 5.2 were online.

=== NeuWon and NuWON ===
NuWON.Net (formerly NeuWon.com, 2014-2018) is another non-commercial but closed-source project meant to revive WON multiplayer gaming. The goal of NuWON is to support all former WON titles and not just the Half-Life family. In 2014, NeuWon sprung from a 2012 WON project on Google Code by a member of same team that created WON2, the Steamless CS Project Team. NeuWon officially launched on March 13, 2016. By May 2021, NuWON had listed 21 supported games (not counting Half-Life mods) plus an additional 8 that needed testing. Though NuWON's site was temporarily unavailable starting in 2022, it has since reappeared as of April 9, 2025.

=== NeoEE ===
NeoEE sprung from the same 2012 WON project on Google Code that NeuWon did. The project emerged from the Save-EE community, which had formed in October 2008 immediately after Activision announced the shutdown of Sierra's game servers. Save-EE initially operated an external lobby client programmed in Visual Basic .NET, but players sought a more integrated solution that could restore the original in-game multiplayer experience.

NeoEE released a server with a fully-working lobby in 2013. The project officially launched on November 29, 2013, billing it as "the biggest Empire Earth multiplayer party" and inviting players to "celebrate the return of the most epic real time strategy game in history." The development team consisted of Ghost and Omega (server administrators from Save-EE), RealForce (who created the installer and patching system), and Jodocus (who analyzed and recreated the original WON lobby software). NeoEE claims to be the first project that recovered 100% of the original lobby functionality, allowing players to use the game's native multiplayer interface rather than third-party workarounds.

A significant update (version 2.0.0.5 for Empire Earth and 1.0.0.2 for The Art of Conquest) was released in April 2016, featuring improvements to the interface, lobby, and gameplay. In March 2023, the Empire Earth Reborn modding project announced plans to add new features to NeoEE and integrate it into future creations. By December 2023, the Reborn project team had officially taken over hosting and maintenance of NeoEE's servers, though the original developers remain involved in development. NeoEE supports Empire Earth and its expansion, The Art of Conquest (AOC), and remains operational as of 2025.

== See also ==
- List of WON-Enabled games
