= Pete Dye Golf Club =

Private golf course near Bridgeport, WV, US

Coordinates: 39°19′42″N 80°17′58″W

The Pete Dye Golf Club is an 18-hole facility in Harrison County, just northwest of Bridgeport, West Virginia. It features 7,308 yards of golf from the longest tees for a par of 72. The course rating is 76.9 and it has a slope rating of 147. Designed by Pete Dye, ASGCA, the Pete Dye golf course opened in 1995. Tony Kowalski manages the course as the General Manager.

== Awards ==
- #1 – Best Course in West Virginia according to Golf Digest
- #10 – America's Best Modern Courses according to Golf Week
- #42 – Top 50 Private Retreats according to Golf Digest
- #74 – Top 100 Courses in the U.S. according to Golf Magazine
- #45 – America's 100 Greatest Golf Courses according to Golf Digest
