= Tiger Woods PGA Tour 06 =

2005 video game

- Developers: EA Redwood Shores (Note: Additional work by Hypnos Entertainment); Headgate Studios (PC); Team Fusion (PSP)
- Publisher: EA Sports
- Series: PGA Tour
- Platforms: GameCube, Microsoft Windows, PlayStation 2, Xbox, PlayStation Portable, Xbox 360, mobile game
- Release: NA: September 22, 2005; NA: September 26, 2005 (PSP); EU: October 7, 2005; AU: October 10, 2005; Xbox 360: NA: November 22, 2005; EU: December 2, 2005
- Genre: Sports
- Modes: Single-player, multiplayer

Tiger Woods PGA Tour 06 is a sports video game developed by EA Redwood Shores for the GameCube, PlayStation 2, Xbox and Xbox 360 versions, Headgate Studios for the Microsoft Windows version, and Team Fusion for the PlayStation Portable version, and published by EA Sports for GameCube, Microsoft Windows, mobile, PlayStation 2, Xbox, PlayStation Portable, and Xbox 360. EA shut down the servers on September 1, 2007, on both Xbox and Xbox 360.

== Gameplay ==
The game features several types of play, including the development of golfers in a simulated PGA Tour environment. Among other things, the game also features a set of famous courses and players. Also it includes the Stroke Play, Match Play, and Skins Play among other numerous methods of play. It also includes the Four Ball, Best Ball, and Stableford modes of play.

By being able to customize golfers and advancing that character through several stages (from amateur to pro) the game allows a high level of identification with the character. The virtual ego can be equipped with various pieces of equipment and styled according to the wishes of the player. The custom outfits are licensed and include several brands which are commonly present in professional golf, among others: Nike, Adidas, Callaway, Ping, Taylormade, etc.

== Reception ==
Reception

Aggregate scores
Aggregator	Score						
Aggregator	GameCube	mobile	PC	PS2	PSP	Xbox	Xbox 360
GameRankings	81%	78%	79%	82%	80%	79%	71%
Metacritic	82/100	N/A	81/100	83/100	80/100	81/100	71/100

Review scores
Publication	Score						
Publication	GameCube	mobile	PC	PS2	PSP	Xbox	Xbox 360
Computer Gaming World	N/A	N/A	4.5/5	N/A	N/A	N/A	N/A
Eurogamer	N/A	N/A	N/A	N/A	N/A	7/10	6/10
Game Informer	8.25/10	N/A	N/A	8.25/10	7.5/10	8.25/10	8.5/10
GameRevolution	B	N/A	N/A	B	N/A	B	C+
GameSpot	7.9/10	N/A	8.9/10	8.1/10	7.9/10	8.1/10	7.8/10
GameSpy	N/A	N/A	N/A	4.5/5	N/A	4.5/5	N/A
GameTrailers	7/10	N/A	N/A	7/10	N/A	7/10	7/10
Hardcore Gamer	3.5/5	N/A	N/A	3.5/5	N/A	3.5/5	N/A
IGN	8.3/10	8.4/10	8.7/10	8.4/10	8.5/10	8.4/10	6.8/10
Nintendo Power	9/10	N/A	N/A	N/A	N/A	N/A	N/A
Nintendo World Report	7.5/10	N/A	N/A	N/A	N/A	N/A	N/A
Official U.S. PlayStation Magazine	N/A	N/A	N/A	3.5/5	4/5	N/A	N/A
Official Xbox Magazine (US)	N/A	N/A	N/A	N/A	N/A	8.6/10	8.5/10
PC Gamer (US)	N/A	N/A	86%	N/A	N/A	N/A	N/A
Detroit Free Press	N/A	N/A	N/A	3/4	N/A	N/A	N/A

Tiger Woods PGA Tour 06 received "generally favorable" reviews on all platforms except the Xbox 360 version, which received "mixed or average" reviews, according to video game review aggregator Metacritic. GamePro's November 2005 issue said that the GameCube, PlayStation 2, and Xbox versions had "a ludicrous amount to do including the '06 PGA Tour season, daily real-time Calendar events, Skills Golf (extra points for hitting through colored rings) and Rival Mode, a single-player career that tests your ranking against golf legends old and new. Money is used solely for purchasing new gear, while separate experience points are now awarded for skill upgrades. Minus points for adding a golf Gamebreaker, and Xbox custom soundtrack support for in-game play would have been nice. Bummer." (Note: GamePro gave all console versions 3.5/5 for sound, and two 4/5 scores for control and fun factor; the only difference is that the magazine gave the GameCube and PlayStation 2 versions each 4/5 for graphics, while giving the Xbox version 4.5/5.) Two issues later, the magazine gave the Xbox version 3.5 out of 5, saying, "No one can deny the Tiger Woods PGA Tour franchise the rank of golf sim head honcho, but sometimes even the best needs to change - and soon." Joe Rybicki of Electronic Gaming Monthly said of the game, "For years I've been saying that the only significant problem with the Tiger games is the putting interface. So what did they do this year? They made putting harder by removing caddy tips and employing the same analog swing interface as tee shots." (Note: Three critics of Electronic Gaming Monthly gave the GameCube, PlayStation and Xbox versions each a score of 9/10, 8/10, and 7.5/10.) In Japan, where the PlayStation 2 version was ported for release on December 22, 2005, followed by the PSP version on February 16, 2006, and the Xbox 360 version a week later, Famitsu gave the game each a score of one eight and three sevens, while Famitsu X360 gave the Xbox 360 version a score of two eights and two sevens.

GameZone gave the GameCube, PlayStation 2, and Xbox versions each a score of 8.5 out of 10, with Anise Hollingshead saying of the GameCube version, "The gameplay could have been more challenging, and the course in the Rivals mode could have been real courses from the past, but these are small quibbles. It's a great game, as always."; Louis Bedigian saying of the PS2 version, "Those who haven't played the previous games will be awestruck by how much depth the game has, and how much it takes to get the hang of each function."; and Code Cowboy saying of the Xbox version, "There are things to nitpick, but as a whole, the game is excellent and a joy to play. It is steeping with realism and challenge." The website's Angelina Sandoval gave the PSP version 8.9 out of 10, saying, "The improvements over the launch title are immense but the overall changes to the gameplay mechanics just make this an addictive treat." Kevin "BIFF" Giacobbi gave the PC version eight out of ten, saying, "Novice players will find this one to be forgiving and experienced players should find enough tweaking to be found to make this enjoyable and not too easy." Natalie Romano, however, gave the Xbox 360 version 7.7 out of 10, saying, "While it is a lot prettier than the other console versions, Tiger Woods PGA Tour 06 for the Xbox 360 feels like a rushed production that plays well enough but still not up to the standards of the new console."

Russ Fischer of X-Play gave the console and PC versions each a score of four stars out of five, saying, "In a vacuum, Tiger Woods PGA Tour 06 is deep and flexible enough to earn a high rating. But for fans who have been shelling out year after year for each update, this is the time to think carefully about whether the tweaks are worth it." However, Greg Sewart gave the Xbox 360 version two stars, saying, "While an online mode does help alleviate some of the issues found in the single-player game, the severe lack of content makes it really hard to justify a purchase." Computer Games Magazine gave the PC version two stars out of five, saying, "EA Sports apparently loved last year's game so much they they've repackaged it."

The PC version won the award for "Best Sports Game" at the 12th Annual PC Gamer Awards.
