= List of New Zealanders by net worth =

Lists of New Zealanders by net worth have been produced by publications like the National Business Review. In addition, international listings of individuals and families based on net worth, such as the Bloomberg Billionaires Index and The World's Billionaires by Forbes, also include New Zealanders in their listings.

== Domestic listings ==
=== National Business Review ===
The National Business Review has produced an annual listing of New Zealand's largest wealthiest people and families since 1990. Beginning in 2021, the publication also measured the altruism of New Zealand's wealthiest citizens, in addition to the amount of money they’ve accumulated. The National Business Review evaluates the net worth of individuals and families using the New Zealand dollar.

In 2026, the wealth of the New Zealanders on the NBR Rich List has grown to $129 billion.

NBR Rich List 2026
Rank	Name	Industry	Value	Known For
1	Mat and Nick Mowbray	Manufacturing	$20 billion	ZURU
2	Graeme Hart	Investment	$14.1 billion	Rank Group
3	Sir Peter Beck	Tech & Services	$11 billion	Rocket Lab
4	Goodman family	Property	$5.5 billion	Goodman Group
5	Todd family	Investment	$3.5 billion	Todd Corporation
6	Sir Peter Jackson and Dame Fran Walsh	Tech & Services	$2.6 billion	The Lord of the Rings
7	Sir Michael Friedlander	Property	$2.1 billion	Samson Corporation
8	Rod Drury	Tech & Services	$1.8 billion	Xero
9	Talley family	Agribusiness	$1.75 billion	Talley's Group
10	Peter Cooper	Property	$1.7 billion	Cooper and Company - Britomart Precinct

NBR Rich List 2025
Rank	Name	Industry	Value	Known for
1	Mat and Nick Mowbray	Manufacturing	$20 billion	ZURU
2	Graeme Hart	Investment	$12.1 billion	Rank Group
3	Goodman family	Property	$5 billion	Goodman Group
4	Todd family	Investment	$3.5 billion	Todd Corporation
5	Sir Peter Jackson and Dame Fran Walsh	Tech & Services	$2.6 billion	The Lord of the Rings
6	Rod Drury	Tech & Services	$2.1 billion	Xero
7	Sir Michael Friedlander	Property	$2 billion	Samson Corporation
8	Fukutake family	Investment	$1.6 billion	Still Group
9	Talley family	Agribusiness	$1.6 billion	Talley's Group
10	Peter Cooper	Property	$1.6 billion	Cooper and Company - Britomart Precinct
11	Bruce Plested	Tech & Services	$1.3 billion	Mainfreight
12	Mark Stewart	Manufacturing	$1.3 billion	PDL, Mastheads Ltd
13	Masfen family	Investment	$1.2 billion	Greymouth Petroleum
14	Trevor Farmer	Property	$1.2 billion	Daily Freight
15	Anne and David Norman	Manufacturing	$1.1 billion	James Pascoe Group
16	Manson family	Property	$1.1 billion	Mansons TCLM
17	Guy Haddleton	Tech & Services	$1 billion	Adaytum, Anaplan
18	Berridge Spencer	Investment	$1 billion	Caxton Pulp and Paper, Purex Toilet Tissue
19	Gibbs family	Investment	$900 million	Gibbs Farm
20	Green family	Property	$880 million	Hugh Green Group

Previous NBR Rich List Top 10
Name	2026 Rank	2025 Rank	2024 Rank	2023 Rank	2022 Rank	2021 Rank
Mowbray	1	1	1	4	4	4
Hart	2	2	2	1	1	1
Beck	3					
Goodman	4	3	4	3	3	3
Todd	5	4	3	2	2	2
Jackson	6	5	5	5	6	
Friedlander	7	7	6	6	5	5
Drury	8	6	10	9	9	6
Talley	9	9	7	7	7	7
Cooper	10	10	9	8		
Fukutake		8	8			
Plested		11		10	8	9
Jones					10	8
Delegat						10

== International listings ==
International listing of wealthiest people, such as the Bloomberg Billionaires Index and The World's Billionaires by Forbes, include several New Zealanders. Both publications issue their listings using their own methodology to evaluate net worth. Both publications evaluate the net worth of individuals using the United States dollar.

=== Bloomberg ===
Bloomberg L.P. maintains a daily listing of individuals worldwide by net worth and publishes it as the Bloomberg Billionaires Index. The Index is updated "at the close of every trading day in New York".

As of 17 June 2026, Graeme Hart was the only New Zealander listed in the Bloomberg Billionaires Index. According to the Index, Hart is the 279th richest person in the world with an estimated net worth of US$12.3 billion, which was primarily accumulated through the finance industry.

=== Forbes ===
Forbes maintains a listing of billionaires entitled The World's Billionaires, and is updated annually. The rankings are based on 7 March 2025 "stock prices and exchange rates" in US dollars. Forbes collaborates with FactSet Research Systems, Orbis, PitchBook Data, Real Capital Analytics, Reonomy, S&P Capital IQ, and VesselsValue to collect data and ascertain its rankings.

The following is a list of individuals whose "country" is listed as New Zealand in Forbes' annual The World's Billionaires for 2026:

List of wealthiest New Zealanders (Forbes, 2026)
World rank	Name	Net worth (USD)	Source of wealth
323	Graeme Hart	$10.2 billion	Investments
1,251	Peter Beck	$3.4 billion	Spacecraft
1,406	Richard Chandler	$3 billion	Investments
2,177	Peter Jackson	$1.9 billion	Movies, digital effects

== See also ==
- List of countries by the number of billionaires
