= Humans vs. Zombies =

Live-action game

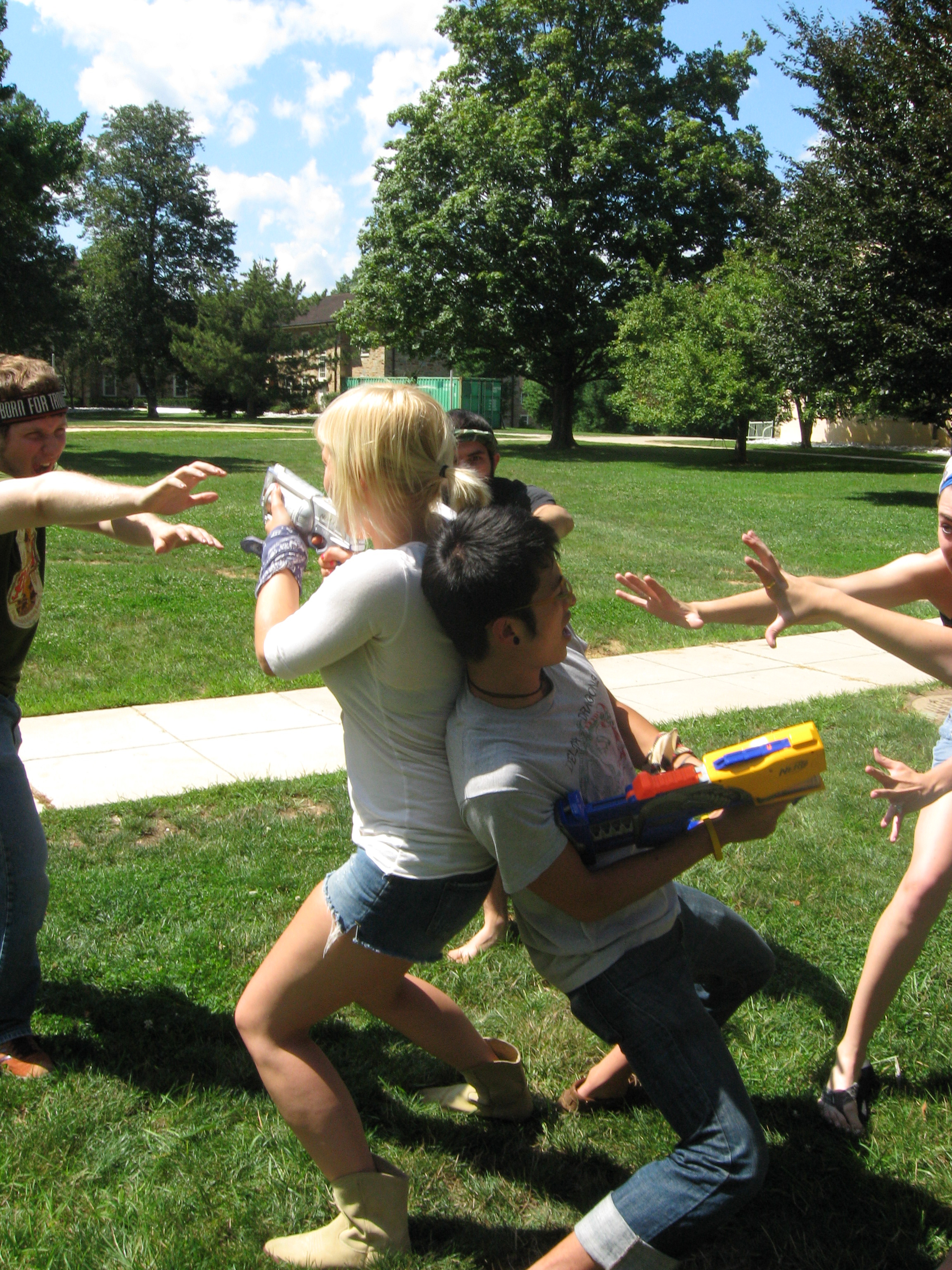
- A group of Humans vs. Zombies players at Goucher College
- Years active: 2005–present
- Playing time: Variable

Humans vs. Zombies (HvZ) is a live-action game predominantly played at US college campuses. The storyline of the game dictates that players begin as Humans and try to survive a Zombie invasion. The ultimate goal of the game is for either all Humans to be turned into Zombies, or for the humans to survive a set amount of time. Humans can defend themselves using any item that is approved by a moderator and thereby deemed safe and appropriate. The most common equipment includes balled up socks, marshmallows, and foam dart blasters. Humans may throw or launch these items at Zombies, who become stunned once hit. Safe zones are also established so that players can eat and sleep in safety. Zombies, on the other hand, are unarmed and must tag Humans to gain a kill. In some cases, if a kill is not made within a set time period, Zombies "starve" and are removed from the field of play.

The game was created in the fall of 2005 at Goucher College by Chris Weed, Brad Sappington, Joe Sklover, Max Temkin, Trevor Moorman, Justin Quick and Ben Beecher, who have since created an official website with general guideline rules and information for other universities to create and customize their own HvZ game. Final rules are determined by each game's moderators and admins. Since the game's creation, Humans vs. Zombies has been played at over 1,000 locations, spanning across six continents, most notably at UC Santa Cruz, the Pennsylvania State University, Utah State University, UMBC, Georgia Tech, Rochester Institute of Technology, SUNY Oswego, Florida State University, and Agnes Scott College.

Humans vs. Zombies has grown in popularity across campuses. While most games deal with relatively few people, some games have grown to have hundreds of participants. Some schools and universities have banned the game due to its perceived violent nature. An increase in sensitivity to gun violence following the 2007 school shooting at Virginia Tech also led to worries about the game's continuation at Goucher and elsewhere, and several games have been shut down due to concerns about Nerf Blasters being used.

While predominantly played on campuses, Humans vs. Zombies is also played in residential areas, camps, and even military bases.

== Gameplay ==
Humans vs. Zombies is a survival game of tag, where "human" players fight off increasingly large numbers of "zombies"; if a human is "turned" (i.e. tagged), then that player becomes a zombie in turn. At the game's beginning, there are only one or two zombies; the zombies multiply by tagging humans, turning them into zombies after a period of one hour. Humans can defend themselves from zombies by using socks, marshmallows, Nerf Blasters or any other toys deemed safe and appropriate; if a zombie is hit by one of these methods of defense, they are stunned (not allowed to interact with the game in any way) for fifteen minutes. The goal of the zombies is to turn all the humans; the humans, meanwhile, must outlast all the zombies. The official rules, produced by Goucher College students, can also be modified to suit a particular campus.

=== Humans ===
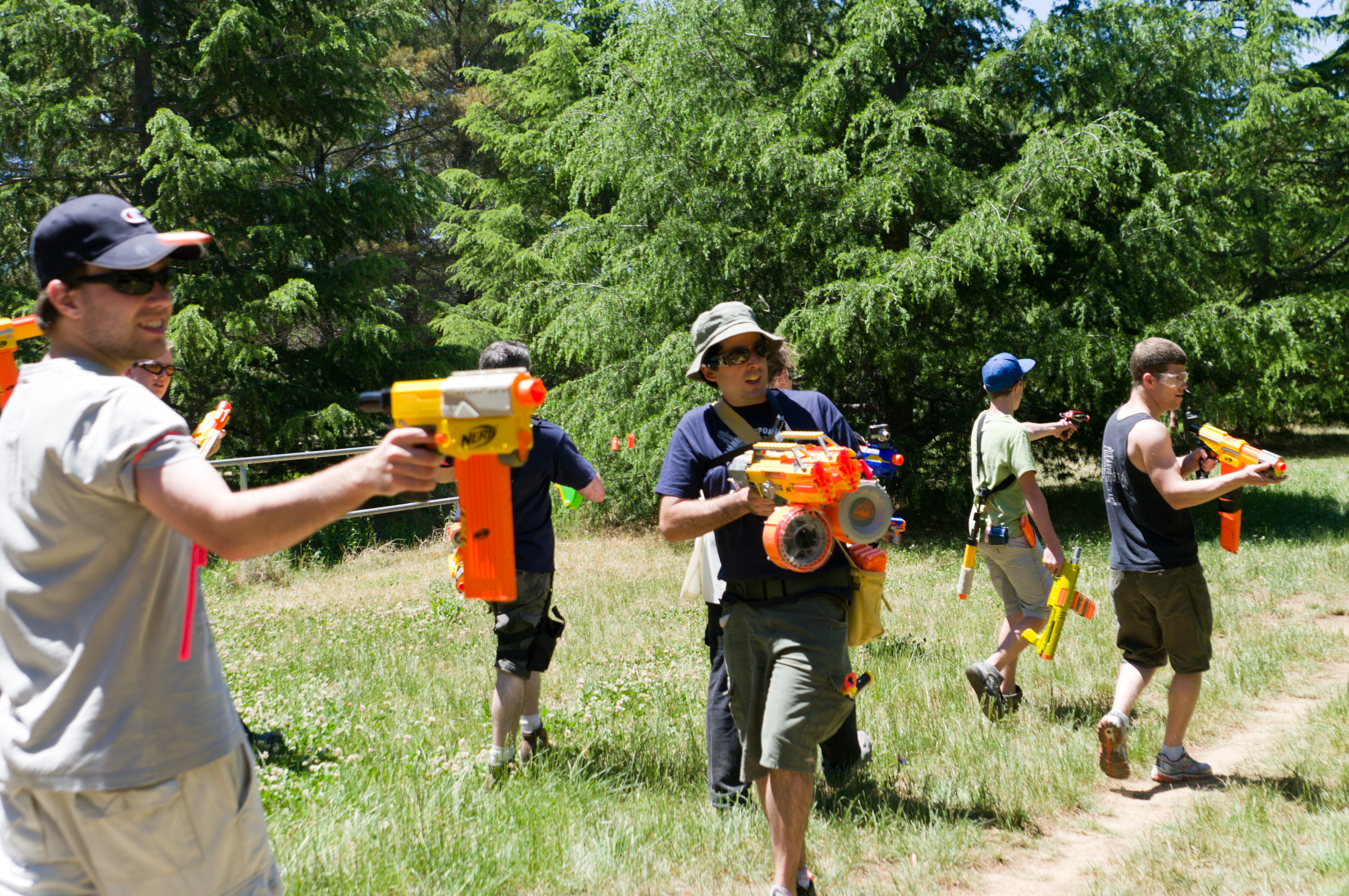
A human team fending off zombies

Almost all players begin the game as humans, and must keep their ID cards with them at all times in case a zombie attacks them. If they are tagged, they must surrender their card, and become a zombie after one hour has elapsed. To defend themselves, humans are allowed Nerf Blasters, socks, or other approved toys. For protection, humans often band together and either stay hidden or attack the zombies directly. Certain areas are declared "safe" and humans can enter these areas without fear of attack. According to the Goucher rules, certain methods of eluding zombies are strictly forbidden; these include use of a car or leaving campus for extended periods. To draw zombies into the open and increase the speed of the game, humans can undertake "missions" with varying objectives.

=== Zombies ===
All zombies wear headbands to distinguish themselves from humans. There is usually at least one original zombie, who starts out the game as a zombie, must start the spread of zombies, and in some rulesets is allowed to be free from wearing a headband for a fixed amount of time. Zombies must gather and input the identification number of all humans that they "turn" into the database to keep track of which humans have been converted. If a zombie is hit with a human's dart or sock, they are "Stunned" for fifteen minutes and cannot interact with the game until that time is up. If a zombie does not make at least one kill in 48 hours of play, then the zombie starves and leaves the game permanently. The different universities have different rules for the game. For example, depending on the number of players at the university, the game may start with more than one original zombie. Also, the amount of time varies as well as the time each zombie has to get at least one bite before dying. Some administrations bring players back, traditionally as a zombie, in order to make the final mission, objective, or overall finale more interesting. The rules for zombies are also known to change in storylines, traditionally after completed missions. This can include alternate stun times, transformation times, or death times. These possibilities make a zombie generally more directly affected by stories than humans.

=== Non-players ===
People who are not registered players are not allowed to interfere with gameplay. Under the original rules, this includes spying on the other team, or helping players stay in a safe area by bringing them food or doing something for a player which would otherwise require them to leave a safe-zone. If a non-player is shot with a Nerf dart or attacked by a player in any way, they should report the player(s) involved if the incident was intentional. Players who attack non-players will be banned under most rules. The original rules, and most University custom rules, stress the importance of safety in the game. The rules stress the safety of the players and non-players by not allowing realistic looking weaponry, weaponry which could hurt on impact, or dangerous behavior during gameplay.

=== Safe zones ===
Since Humans vs. Zombies can last for days, rules establish "safe zones" where gameplay does not take place, and where players can stop participation in the game for a certain period. Safe zones are designated by the administrators in conjunction with University rules and/or other applicable rules. Safe zones include dorm rooms, bathrooms, dining halls, Academic buildings, Health centers and other such places. Safe zones vary by the rules set at each separate University. Some include every building on the campus and all vehicles, others may exclude some, but not all buildings and vehicles. Players are also considered safe attending a mandatory academic or athletic event. They are not safe, however, going to or coming from these events. Some colleges also consider a "wheel rule" where players are in a safe zone if they are on a skateboard, bicycle, or wearing rollerblades. Generally, HvZ is played on-campus, so off-campus is considered a safe zone as well. Under the original rules, however, all Humans must sleep on-campus and being away for longer than 24 hours warrants automatic death or removal. Every area not designated a safe zone by administrators is considered a free-play area where players may tag or be tagged. Under the original rules, the game is played at all times and never stops until the game has reached the conclusion.

=== Missions ===
Some universities incorporate missions into the game play to encourage more active participation. These missions usually come with a reward for the winning side. This reward could benefit the winners or it could penalize the losing side, and thus benefit the winning side. Missions can easily be modified in-game to account for how many players are humans and how many are zombies, or to make the mission easier for one side and/or harder for the opposing side. Missions can also be constructed to follow a storyline throughout the game.

== Controversy ==
Humans vs. Zombies games have at times come under scrutiny by concerned members of communities in and around colleges. Many colleges have banned the game outright due to concerns about gun violence. Goucher College and other universities playing the game came under particular scrutiny after the Virginia Tech shootings in 2007; reporter Laura Wexler of The Washington Post stated that since the games are occurring in the midst of several shootings, "[there has been] a heightened sensitivity and fear, and desire to prevent such occurrences. The reaction may not be completely rational, but it is understandable". For instance, Alfred University was locked down on April 8, 2008 after reports that a young man was carrying a gun around before police determined the "gun" was a toy and the student was a participant in a Humans vs. Zombies game. Goucher college president Sanford J. Ungar released a statement saying:

It is unfortunate that the latest round of "Humans vs. Zombies" was playing itself out on the day of the events at Virginia Tech, and it is true that the student organizers of the game must be more vigilant about keeping it from interfering with classes and disrupting the daily lives of those who would prefer not to be involved in it. We are working with them to assess the game and its future at Goucher.

In response to these complaints, game moderator Max Temkin said, "It's unfortunate that people feel threatened at Goucher. . . If people are concerned about their well-being, they should probably go to Public Safety and report the nature of their concern. No one's ever been hurt by a Nerf gun in our game."

There is also the controversy over what is appropriate dress for players. Many players wear BDU, tactical vests, and camouflage clothing of myriad patterns and designs. In response to players wearing military garb, Temkin said, "The players I know of that were wearing these fatigues were players who are in the military, and as far as I'm concerned, they've earned the right to wear that uniform however and wherever they please, and it's not up to me or anyone else to tell them not to wear it."

Following the Virginia Tech shootings, the game was banned outright at some colleges. Other college administrations banned Nerf blasters instead to discourage the game, but students were still allowed to use balled up socks or marshmallows, which students have admitted are not as much fun. Many campuses who responded negatively following the shootings have since repealed the Nerf bans, though, like the students frustrations, others have remained in place.

After a performance at Ball State University on March 1, 2010, comedian Ethan Fixell of Dave and Ethan criticized students who play the school's popular Humans vs. Zombies game during an interview with the BSU Daily News. Fixell said "Humans Versus Zombies is a woman repellent. It's like anti-cologne." Some students felt that these remarks were inaccurate, as many of the players of the Ball State Humans vs. Zombies game are women.

A few weeks later, Fixell defended his stance in an interview with HumansVsZombies.org.

At the University of Wisconsin–Madison, the 2013 Fall game was postponed for a month after a shooting incident on Langdon Street. The following message sent out to players by the moderators explains it best:

After talking briefly with the University and UWPD, we the moderators have decided that the game is going to be suspended indefinitely ... as we want to remain sensitive to the fluid events happening on campus. In the interest in continuing to play Humans versus Zombies here, we have decided it is in everyones best interest if we delay the rest of the round.

At Bridgewater State University, the second 2013 Fall game was suspended and later cancelled after a participant was arrested for suspicious activity.

Some Humans vs. Zombies clubs have made an effort to replace the word "gun" when referring to equipment with the word "blaster." This allows Humans vs. Zombies players to try to distance themselves from the controversy. The Humans vs. Zombies club at some universities such as UMBC takes this further and enforces responsible behavior from their players. When referring to irresponsible behavior, one UMBC moderator has even said "We will deny you were ever a part of this club", referring to if a player engaged in especially irresponsible behavior.

== See also ==
- Assassin (game)
- Zombie walk
- Nerf war
