= Foam dart blaster =

Toy gun

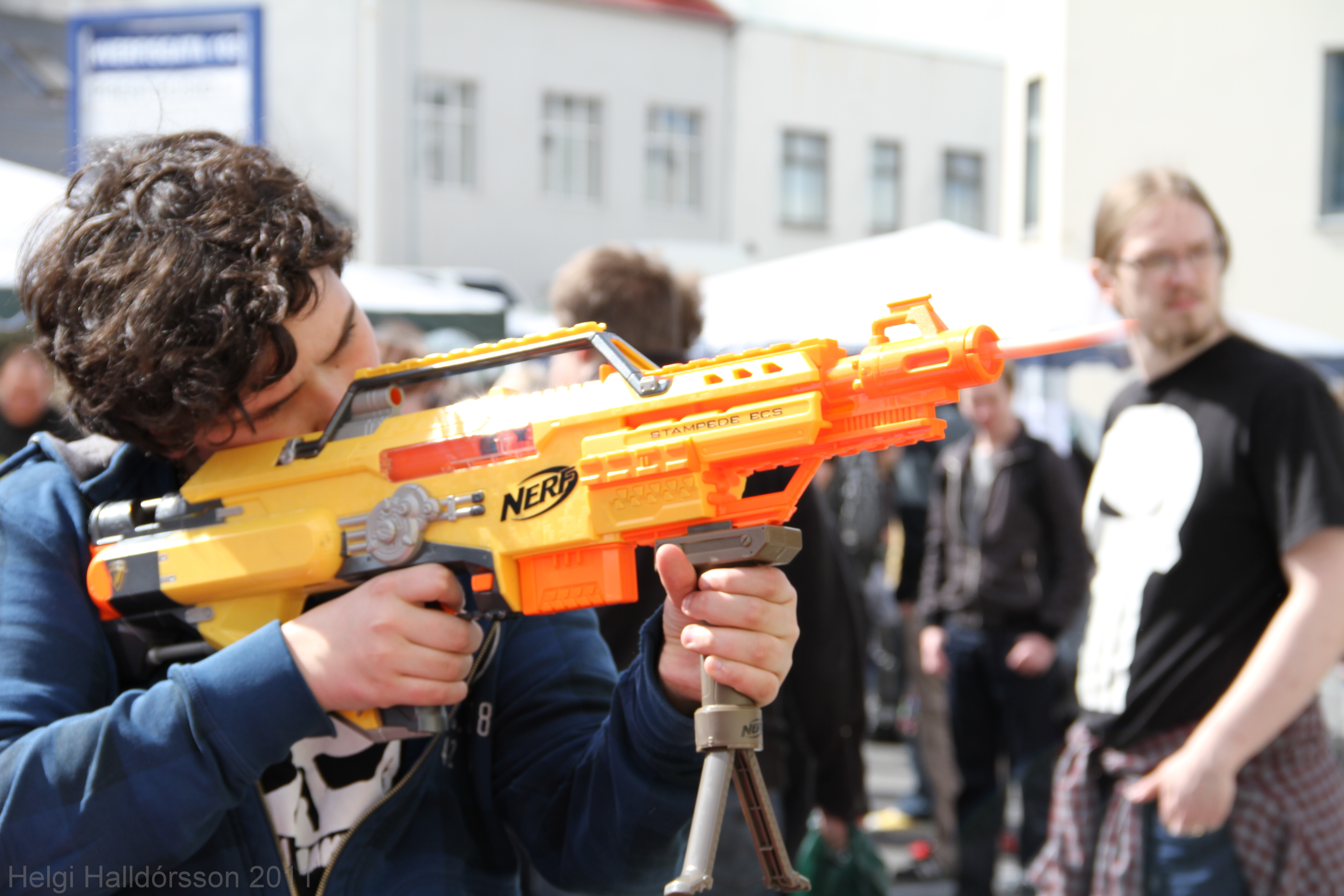
A foam dart blaster enthusiast with a Nerf Stampede ECS in 2011

A foam dart blaster, or simply blaster, is a toy gun that shoots foam darts. The term is often treated synonymously with Nerf Blaster, as Nerf was the first brand to start producing blasters, and has since remained the most notable producer of them. Other notable brands include Zuru's X-Shot and Prime Time Toys' Dart Zone. More competitive blaster enthusiasts sometimes choose to opt for building or 3D printing their own blaster instead for improved performance, and modding is popular within the community as well.

Foam dart blasters are commonly used in Nerf wars, usually organized either by Nerf internet community (NIC) or locally by youth organizations.

== History ==
The first foam dart blaster produced was Sharpshooter in 1992 by Nerf, owned by Hasbro. Nerf had earlier produced blasters that fired foam balls, starting in 1989, and many foam dart blaster producers continue to produce blasters that utilize different projectiles such as disks or balls.

== Types ==
While there exists a variety of priming mechanisms for foam dart blasters, the two major ones are spring-powered, typically being manually powered, and flywheel, typically requiring batteries.

=== Spring-powered ===
In a spring-powered blaster, the spring connects to an air plunger that, when the blaster is fired, releases the air to a sealed tube to blow the dart down the barrel.

=== Flywheel ===
A flywheel blaster has a set of rapidly spinning wheels, that upon contact propel the dart forwards.

=== Drain ===
A drain blaster requires the user to manually compress air using a bicycle pump mechanism. This air is released when the trigger is pressed. The prefix 'drain' comes from the typical majority of these blasters being made from PVC pipes.

By this definition, a 'drain blaster' includes older compressed air Nerf blasters. Homemade drain blasters are a lot easier to make potent blasters, and are typically regulated at Nerf wars due to variable muzzle velocity.

== Harm ==
A key risk is that of eye injuries due to projective striking in or around the eyes. The can cause severe blunt ocular trauma and permanent visual loss, particularly in children. This should always be prevented by wearing eye protection during play.

== See also ==
- Buzz Bee Toys
