= Coatesville mansion =

Mansion in Coatsville, New Zealand

- Former names: Chrisco mansion Dotcom mansion
- Alternative names: Mahoenui Valley

General information
- Type: Residential home
- Location: 186 Mahoenui Valley Road, Coatesville, Coatesville, New Zealand
- Coordinates: 36°43′38″S 174°39′39″E
- Completed: 2006
- Cost: NZ$32.5m (April 2016)
- Owner: Nick, Anna and Mat Mowbray

Coatesville mansion, originally known as Chrisco mansion, then Dotcom mansion, and lately Mahoenui Estate, is a mansion in Coatesville north of Auckland in New Zealand. It is one of the country's most expensive houses.

== History ==
The house was built in 2006 in Coatesville for Richard Bradley, who is known for owning the company "Chrisco" that sells Christmas hampers in Australia, New Zealand, the United Kingdom, and Canada.

Internet entrepreneur Kim Dotcom rented the house from 2010 for NZ$1 million per year. The mansion became well known through the police raid on Dotcom carried out on 20 January 2012; much video footage was made available to the media, showing the police swooping in with helicopters to arrest Dotcom and some of his business partners. Dotcom vacated the property in December 2015 and claimed that he had paid NZ$9 million for improvements.

After Dotcom left, Bradley put the property up for sale. Tenders closed in April 2016 and a sale was confirmed in June that year. The purchasers were the Mowbray siblings (Nick, Anna and Mat) who are joint owners of the toy company ZURU. The Mowbrays, all in their early 30s at the time, paid NZ$32.5 million for the house and renamed it Mahoenui Estate.

== Description ==
The house is located at 186 Mahoenui Valley Road in Coatesville, 30 minutes north of Auckland. The house is on 22.6 hectares (56 acres) of land. It has 12 bedrooms. There are three swimming pools, one of which is an Olympic length indoor pool. In 2014, the property had a rateable value of NZ$23.55 million.
