= Live-action game =

Game where players act as characters

Live-Action Gaming
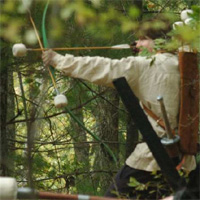
- Years active: 1978–present
- Setup time: 15 minutes
- Playing time: 2 hours to 14 days

A live-action game (LAG) is a game where the participants act out their characters' actions.

== Play overview ==
Some live-action games are described as a "flag wars", "combat sports" or "battle gaming". Although these are strictly live-action games, they lack the plot and "character assumption" that is usually a part of live-action gaming. That is, each player assumes the persona of a character (like a "handle" in an online environment) and maintains that persona until the character dies. This variation is similar to the variation that also exists in table-top and computer games. Some table-top games (like Monopoly) do not require the player to assume a distinct persona, but games like Dungeons & Dragons do have this requirement. The same is true of computer games—the player of the single-player version of Half-Life assumes the role of a character with a name and personality; The player of Tetris does not.

Live-action gaming is sometimes described to novice players as a hobby lying somewhere between LARP and historical reenactment. This is accurate in that the game contains the WYSIWYG philosophy and minimalist rules of historical reenactment, but adds the unpredictable outcome and player-created plot found at some LARP events.

== Rules ==
Rules for live-action games are extremely simple compared to other forms of live interactive games like American football or Orienteering. Combat is simulated, with one hit causing a wound. There are no 'hit points' or other conventions. Game rules are not used as stand-ins for components of the imaginary environment. If a novice player cannot immediately understand a rules convention, that rules convention is not used. Referees are not used and players are relied upon to be honest in their application of the rules. A special effort is made to convey and adhere to the spirit of the game.

=== Environment ===
The key to live action gaming is an attempt by the game directors to create a WYSIWYG environment. Instead of using a laminated card to represent a magical staff, an actual staff is used, as one might build for a play. Weapons (such as buffer swords or airsoft guns) are almost always part of the experience. Players stay "in character" at all times (except for medical emergencies). There is no convention for removing oneself from the playing environment.

=== Production ===
Live action games are run by a staff that writes a plot that binds together the expected events of the game into a rough storyline, creates obstacles for the players to overcome, and plays the adversaries in the game world.

=== Implementation ===
A single live action game can span anywhere from 2 hours to 14 days. Active groups can run as many as 18-20 events per year, with a mix of new players and veterans at each event. Most events are run by volunteer organizations for the enjoyment and exercise of the players and staff. Some events are free and use publicly available sites (such as college campuses), while others charge a fee to cover a private site rental (such as an outdoor camp) and equipment (and sometimes food).

== See also ==
- Alternate reality game
- Assassin (game)
- Humans vs. Zombies
- Live-action virtual reality game
