= St Peter's School, Cambridge =

Location
- 1716 Cambridge Road; Cambridge, 3283; New Zealand; 37°53′S 175°28′E

Information
- Type: Private, day & boarding
- Motto: Structa Saxo ("Built on Rock")
- Denomination: Anglican
- Established: 1936; 90 years ago
- Ministry of Education Institution no.: 141
- Principal: Julie Small
- Head of School: Jason Speedy (from 2025)
- Years: 7–13
- Gender: Coeducational
- Enrolment: 1,215 (July 2026)
- Socio-economic decile: 10
- Website: stpeters.school.nz

St Peter's School is a private, co-educational, Anglican secondary school for Years 7–13 in Cambridge, New Zealand. The school is located on 100 acres (0.40 km^{2}) of ground, surrounded by school-owned farmland alongside the Waikato River. The schools motto, 'Structa Saxo', is Latin and translates to "Built on a Rock".

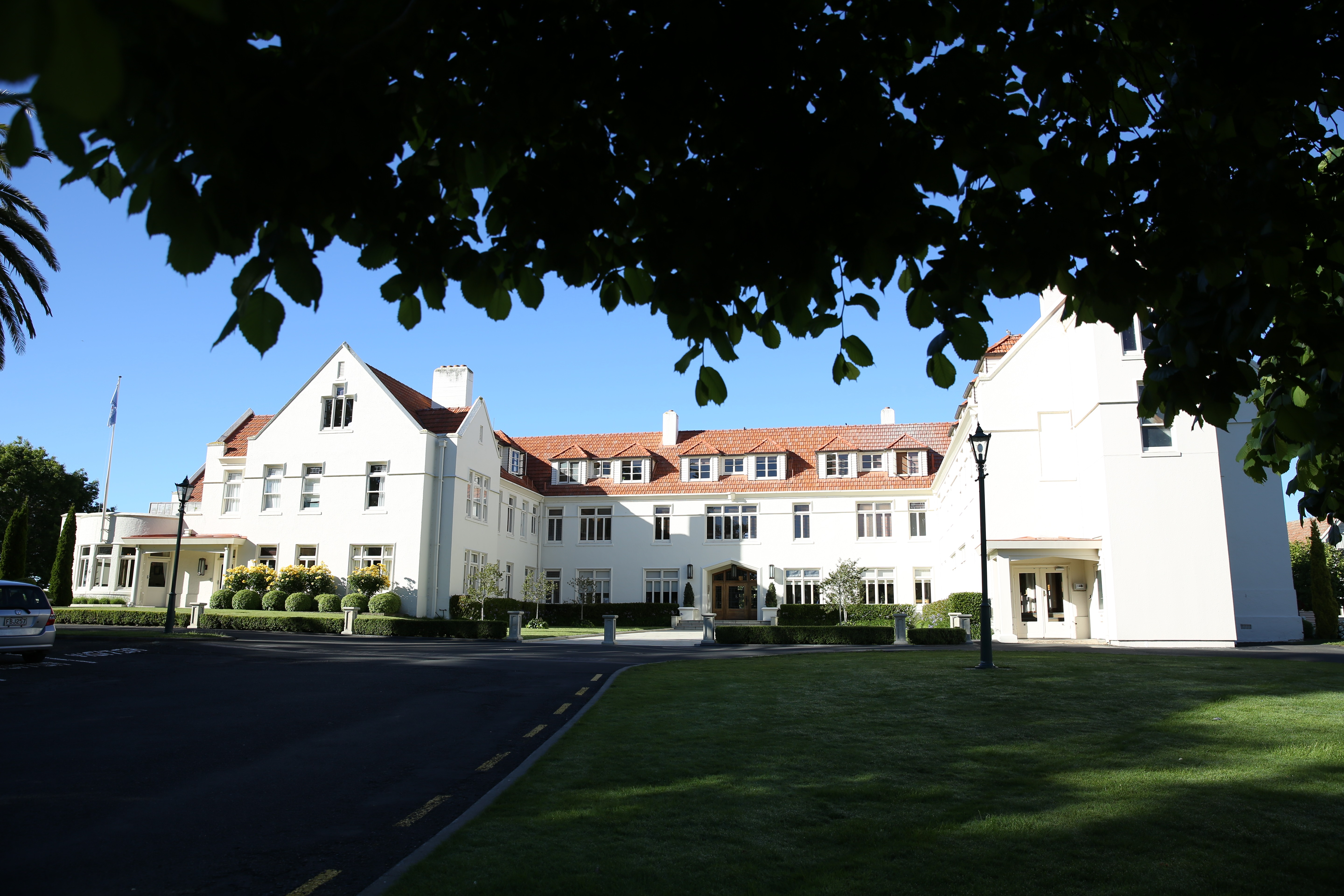
Main reception at St Peter's, Cambridge.

The school has facilities for boarding- and day-students, as well as on-campus accommodation for teachers, tutors and workers.

== History ==
The school was founded in 1936 by Arthur Broadhurst (1890–1986) and James Morris Beaufort (1896–1952). It was designed by American architect Roy Alston Lippincott, who designed the main building to resemble a large English country home. St Peter's became a co-educational school in 1987.

The Robb Sports Centre was constructed in 2005. The building includes two indoor basketball or badminton courts, netball courts, tiered seating for up to 200 people, a weights room, an aerobics studio, two squash courts and an artificial climbing wall.

In 2009 construction of a new English block was completed, along with a new library and computer rooms.

The board of the school approved the International Baccalaureate programme to be taught alongside the current NCEA curriculum at Year 12 and 13, effective 2009. It is the only school in the Waikato to offer the IB Diploma.

A new Junior School area (Year 7–8 students) was completed in June 2014. Also in 2014 Owl Farm was launched, a demonstration farm that is a joint venture between St Peter's School, Cambridge and Lincoln University. Students use the farm regularly for a wide variety of applications including animal feeding, breeding and health, pasture composition, growth rates and dry matter percentage, weed identification, and more.

Also in 2014, the Business and Entrepreneurial Centre (BEC) was opened. It is a class about business.

The Avantidrome, a velodrome, was built on the school's grounds in 2014. It was officially opened by the Duke and Duchess of Cambridge.

In 2018 it reached a record roll of over 1130 students.

Junior Sports Academies (Rugby, Football, Netball and Cricket) were introduced in 2017 as curriculum-based options in Years 7–10. School teams for these sports are offered at all age groups as co-curricular opportunities for all students, regardless of whether they choose to enrol in a curriculum academy or not. St Peter's has other sports academies including Equestrian, Rowing, Swimming, Golf, Rugby, and Cycling.

In 2018 the school implemented the Well-being Curriculum and Pastoral Care structure. The Well-being Curriculum is at the leading edge of educational circles and provides benefits to all students and staff. The school has plans to open a purpose-built Well-being Centre in 2019–2020. As part of this, learning (tutor) groups were introduced. They are single gender in Year 9 and 10 and mixed gender in Years 11, 12 and 13.

The Musical Theatre Academy was also launched in 2018. It provides student with intensive vocational training outside of academic class time. The programme is influenced by research that was conducted on top performing arts schools around the world. New Zealand musical theatre director David Sidwell is the Academy Advisor.

In 2022, a new Food Tech block was opened. It has modern facilities.

In 2024, they renovated the Junior School and renamed it to “The College” which is an area for Year 13 students to study and go to class instead of the usual areas of school. They also moved the Junior students to the Business Entrepreneurial Centre (BEC).

== Historic sexual abuse ==
In November 2021, the school's chair announced that police were investigating historical cases of sexual abuse. The school announced that nineteen boys suffered sexual, physical or emotional abuse between 1936 and 1981, in cases involving eight staff. The police investigation began in 2019 and followed an internal investigation which had started in 2018. As of 25 November, police would not say whether charges would be laid. The Royal Commission of Inquiry into Abuse in Care, a government-run inquiry that was established in 2018, had already heard from many former students of the school about abuse there. The chair of the school's board, John Macaskill-Smith, apologised to former students and said school trustees had a commitment towards "putting things right". He said that of the eight implicated staff, most are very old or dead, while the whereabouts of others is unknown. He noted that "a couple [of these staff members] have been prosecuted for abuse while operating as teachers".

== Enrolment ==
As a private school, St Peter's School charges tuition fees to cover costs. For the 2025 school year, tuition fees for New Zealand residents are $23,700 per year for students in years 7 and 8, $27,120 per year for students in years 9 and 10, and $29,395 per year for students in years 11 and above. Boarding fees for all students are $19,640 per year.

As of July 2026, St Peter's School has roll of 1,215 students, of which 104 (8.6%) identify as Māori. As a private school, the school is not assigned an Equity Index.

== Notable alumni ==
- George Makgill (1934 – 2003) – Deputy Speaker, House of Lords
- Sir Vaughan Jones (1952 – 2020) – Mathematician
- Keith Lowen (born 1974) – All Black
- Chris Watson (born 1976) – composer and film-maker
- Stuart Farquhar (born 1982) – Javelin thrower
- Anna Mowbray (born 1983/1984) – Entrepreneur
- Nick Mowbray (born 1985) – Entrepreneur
- Rushlee Buchanan (born 1988) – Track and road cyclist
- Georgia Perry (born 1993) – Rower
- Matthew Dunham (born 1994) – Rower
- Tim Seifert (born 1994) – Cricketer
- Sam Perry (born 1995) – Swimmer
- Samipeni Finau (born 1999) – All Black
- Ellesse Andrews (born 1999) – Track cyclist
- Ollie Norris (born 1999) – Rugby player
- Cameron Roigard (born 2000) – All Black
- Charlisse Leger-Walker (born 2001) - basketball player
- Ally Wollaston (born 2001) – Track and road cyclist

== See also ==
- List of schools in New Zealand
