= X-Shot =

Toy weaponry brand

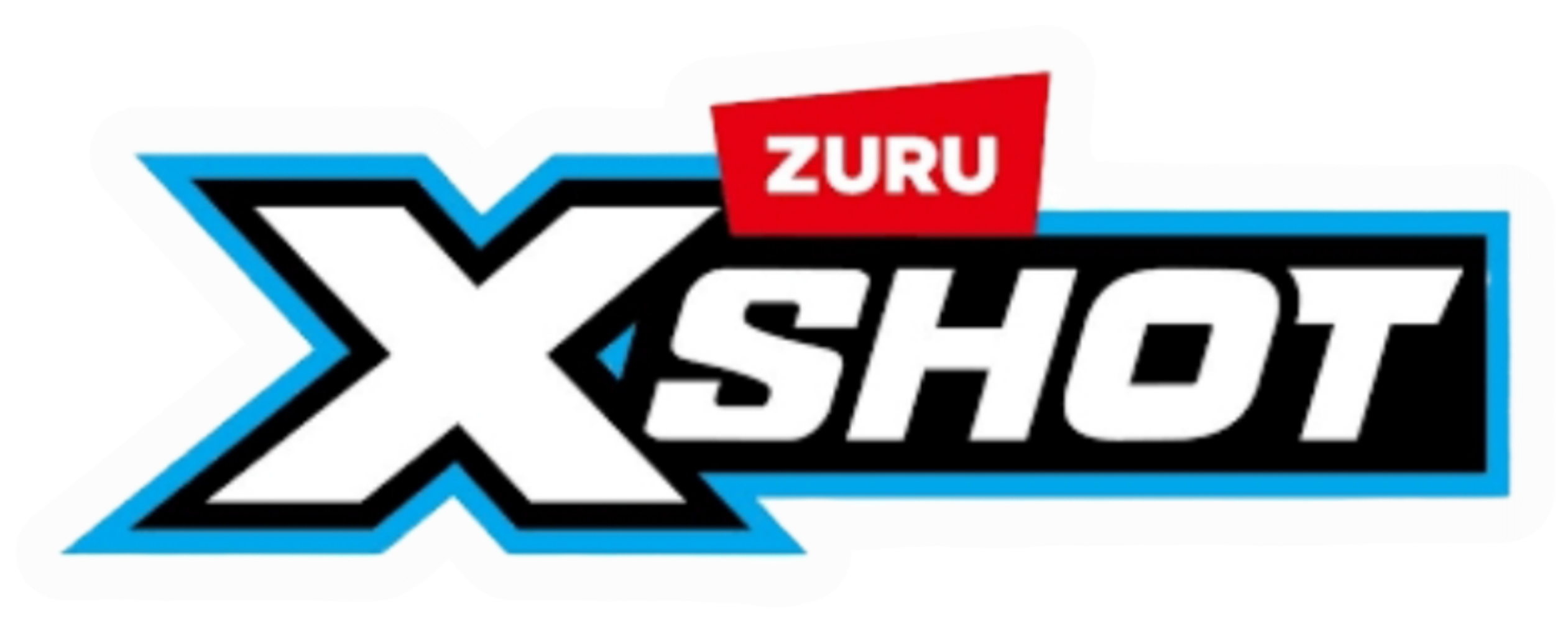
- Founder: Zuru
- Country of Origin: United States of America or New Zealand
- Founded: 2011
- IP Owner: Zuru
- Manufacturer: Zuru
- Website: zurutoys.com/brands/xshot

X-Shot is a toy weaponry brand from Zuru and is an alternative to Nerf. The toy brand has sold many blasters over the years with collaborations with Sonic the Hedgehog, Water pistols and more.

Many of the blasters are available worldwide and can also be found in supermarkets rather than Nerf Blasters.

== Brand history ==
The first blaster was released and is called the Reflex 6, a revolver type blaster that can hold up to Six darts. The blaster has being resold multiple times but had its color changed from Goldish Yellowish to White and then to Red which is the color that is currently used to this day. Many other blasters were made in 2011 as the Micro which is a single shot blaster that can only hold One dart. The MK3 is a blaster that holds Three darts. All of these blasters were released in 2011 and resold in different colours since 2018. In 2019, X-Shot collaborated with Ninja (a gamer and YouTuber) and released Ninja themed blasters. These were only limited edition.

== Products ==
=== Excel ===
Excel is a blaster range that is in the colour red. This blaster range holds the Reflex 6, MK3, Micro, Xcces, Quickslide and more.

=== Insanity ===
The Insanity blaster line is a series of blasters that take advantage of attaching blasters & accessories together using Picatinny rails. Notable blasters in the Insanity line include the Motorised Dart Storm, Manic and Motorised Blitz Fire.

=== Skins ===
Skins are blasters that have Sonic the Hedgehog on them or ether their own skins Beast Mode. These blasters are ether from the Excel blaster range or a design just made for the Skins. These were released in 2022 or 2023.

=== Dino Striker ===
The Dino Striker or Dino Attack is a blaster that is a revolver style blaster that can hold a capacity of 12 Darts. There are only Two colours which is red or blue. The blaster came with a set of themed Dino eggs as a target. Blue is now the only available colour.

=== X-Shot Pro ===
X-Shot Pro is a 14+ series of blasters that shoot "Half length darts" rather than the traditional full length ones at a much higher velocity than traditional blasters, hitting between 120-200fps depending on the blaster. Some of the blasters in the line include the Pro Longshot & Longshot 2.0, Motorised Piston Pump and Motorised Thrasher.

=== Blastercorn ===
The Blastercorn is a revolver style blaster that is the theme of a unicorn. The blaster was released in 2024 with a single shot version that shoots out of the horn.

=== HorrorFire ===
The Horrorfire is a zombie line that has similar looking blasters to the Nerf Blaster line Zombie Strike. The blaster line was released in 2024.

== Concerns ==
There has being many concerns about X-Shot as of being minor injuries as being shot in the eyes and harming children because of how powerful the blasters are.
