= Nerf war =

War involving toys by Nerf

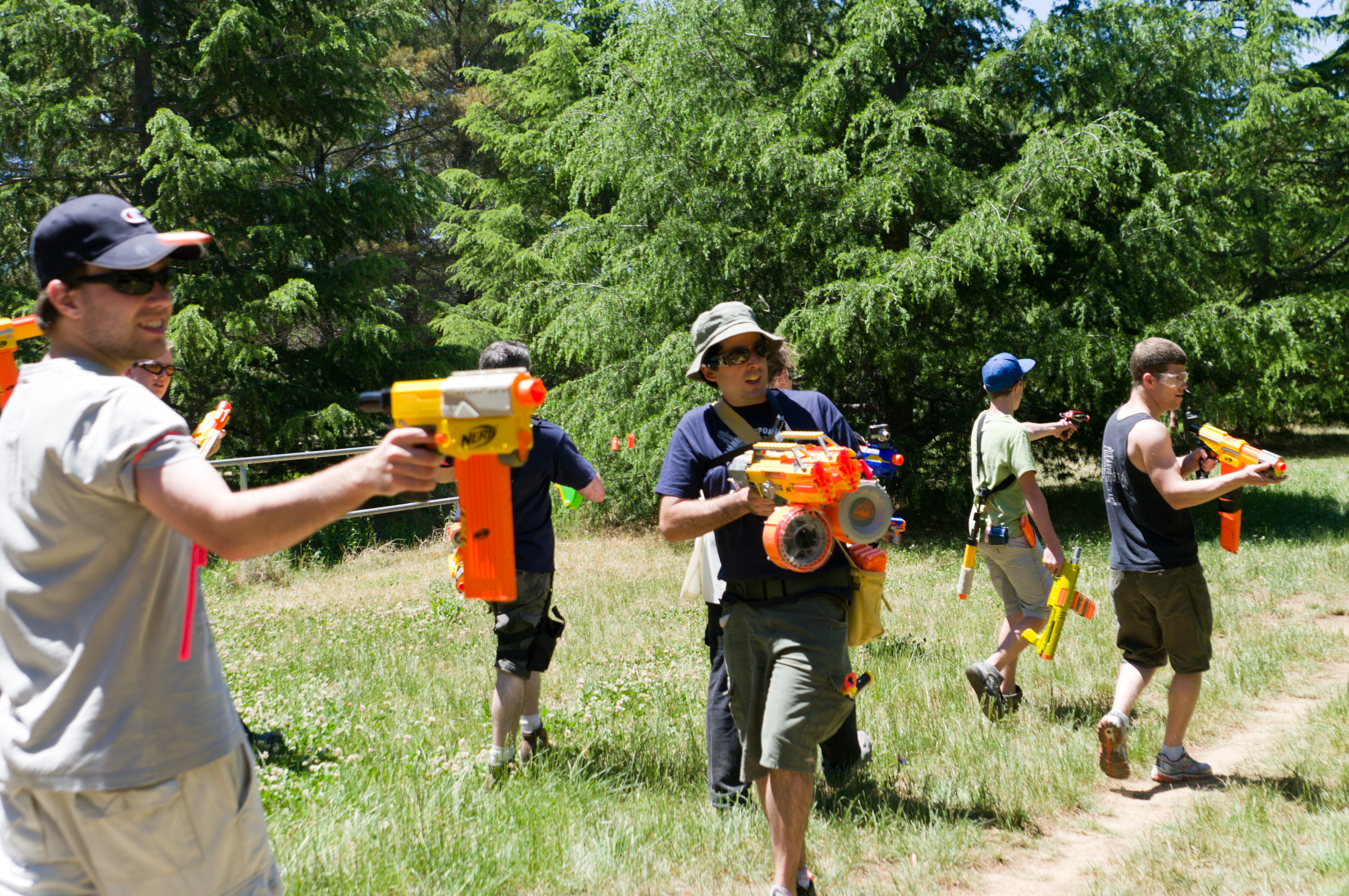
A group of adults partaking in a Nerf War

A Nerf war is an activity involving Nerf Blasters or other foam-blasting toys. Since foam-firing blasters are relatively safe and cheap, Nerf wars can include participants and battlefields otherwise unsuitable for airsoft and paintball, such as children.

== Background ==
A Nerf war is usually played by young children with connections to schooling. The activity is used for entertainment.

== Nerf Internet community (NIC) wars ==
Many wars across the United States are organized and promoted through the forums of enthusiast sites. The members of these forums are collectively known as the Nerf Internet Community (NIC).

The NIC holds large annual wars on both the East and West Coasts of the United States, and certain locations even have bi-annual or monthly wars. There are wars all around Australia as well, and a yearly event called Reign of Foam. Some colleges and youth groups have active clubs and associations that host Nerf wars regularly.

== See also ==
- Humans vs. Zombies
- Team deathmatch

== Further sources ==
- Sock It to Me: Competitive Knitters Get Deadly Serious; Based on 'Assassin' Game, This Contest Has Players On Pins and Needles. Kevin J. Delaney. Wall Street Journal. (Eastern edition). New York, N.Y.: Dec 17, 2007. pg. A.1
- Claussen, Nick (2006-10-29). "The war of the zombies vs. humans rages in Athens". Ohio: The Athens News.
- ALL WORK AND SOME PLAY BRINGING JOY TO THE OFFICE; [FINAL Edition] RODD AUBREY THE ASSOCIATED PRESS. Seattle Post - Intelligencer. Seattle, Wash.: Jul 7, 1998. pg. C.2
- Title:Nerf Guns Strike a Nerve on Campuses. (cover story) Authors:Young, Jeffrey R. Source:Chronicle of Higher Education; 4/25/2008, Vol. 54 Issue 33, pA1-A8, 2p
- McLaughlin, Sheila (2004-05-06). "Teens' Nerf guns raise ruckus". The Cincinnati Enquirer.
- Epstein, Laura (2009-08-11). "Nerf War!". The Blue Banner.
- Wendt, Megan (2010-05-07). "Freshmen unwind with Nerf wars". The Augustana Mirror.
- Kanki, Jamie (2003-06-06). "The power of nerf Shoot, score and generally enjoy mayhem in organized war". The Kansas City Star. p. E3.
- Columbia County Bureau (2005-12-13). "Nerf war is, like, heck". The Augusta Chronicle.
- Wolfson, Bernard J (1999-08-15). "Don't mind that Nerf dart in your eye; it's younger workers playing on the job". Reading Eagle. p. C4.
