= Fuggler =

"Funny-ugly" collectable toy brand

- Founder: Louise McGettrick
- Country of Origin: United Kingdom
- Founded: 2010
- IP Owner: Libertas Brands
- Manufacturer: Zuru
- Website: fuggler.com

Fuggler is a brand of collectible plush toys and plastic figures characterised by their deliberately "funny-ugly" appearance, human-like teeth, and mischievous personalities. They are officially described as "funny-ugly monsters that will warm your heart and take over your life with their mischievous antics and straight-up bonkers appearance." The brand was created in 2010 by British artist Louise McGettrick. Later, Fugglers would go on to see mass production and be managed by many, going to Spin Master; then Libertas Brands acquired the brand and worked with ToyMonster and Addo Play, before finally Libertas Brands began to work with Zuru instead.

== Brand history ==
The history of the Fuggler brand is characterized by its transition from an independent, handmade novelty line on Etsy to a highly sought-after mass-market intellectual property (IP). The brand's corporate evolution is defined by shifting alliances between IP owners, manufacturing licensees, and global distributors.

=== Louise McGettrick (2010–2018) ===
The idea for Fugglers is said to have started when Louise McGettrick got bored while Christmas shopping online and stumbled upon a bag of false teeth being sold on eBay. In an interview, McGettrick said: "I couldn't for the life of me understand why someone would either be selling, or would want to own, a zip-lock bag full of dentures, and the more I thought about it, the funnier it became. Eventually, I had this vision of a little old lady buying them to add to her homemade teddy bears." McGettrick bought the teeth and added them to her own stuffed animals. The original Fugglers were very simplistic, but still had the signature teeth and "BUTT-on" hole. McGettrick even claims she originally had no intentions of seriously selling Fugglers, viewing them as more of a joke than a product. The first batch of Fugglers included 6 different variants, which McGettrick attributes to there being 6 sheets of felt in the cheapest pack she could find. Louise McGettrick owned the Fuggler brand on Etsy for approximately seven years and two months after she made the first Fugglers, from her West Yorkshire home.

=== Spin Master (2018–2021) ===
Michael Goodman, a toy licensing agent, facilitated the deal between Louise McGettrick and Canadian multinational toy company Spin Master, which bought all rights to Fugglers, becoming both the sole IP owner and global distributor for the brand. When asked in an interview, Michael Goodman humorously recalled first pitching Fugglers to an executive at Spin Master. "The guy was like, 'This is disgusting, I don't want you to send a sample, don't contact me about this product.' I was like, 'Oh my god, it's a doll with fake teeth, relax.'" Spin Master went on to scale the brand from simple hand stitching and dental novelties to a massive production line.

=== Libertas Brands, ToyMonster, and Addo Play (2021–2024) ===
In 2021, the global intellectual property rights for Fuggler were acquired by Libertas Brands, a company co-founded by toy industry veterans Stuart Grant and Mark Kingston specifically to manage and scale commercial IPs.

To revive the brand, Libertas Brands established a multi-tiered corporate ecosystem, in which Libertas Brands maintained core ownership of the characters and trademarks; the master toy licensing rights were granted to UK-based Addo Play, which took over the design, engineering, and product sourcing for over 200 new monster variants. Addo Play partnered directly with Melbourne-based ToyMonster International. ToyMonster acted as the primary commercial engine, utilizing its international logistics networks to secure premium retail space at Walmart and Five Below (US), Toys "R" Us (Canada), Tesco (UK), and Kmart (Australia).

=== Libertas Brands and Zuru (2024–present) ===
In mid-2024, Libertas Brands reconstructed their licensing agreements, smoothly transitioning the master plush licensing and distribution rights from Addo Play and ToyMonster to Zuru. Additionally, to optimize growth across different market sectors, Libertas Brands divided sub-licensing among several specialized firms, such as PMI Kids' World and Hunter Price International. PMI Kids World secured exclusive global rights to manufacture non-plush collectibles, including miniature figures, stampers, keychains, and advent calendars. Hunter Price International acquired licenses for lifestyle, stationery, and sensory products, expanding the brand into school backpacks and tactile toys.

To manage local retail accounts and territorial marketing, Libertas Brands appointed Retail Monster for North America, WildBrain CPLG for international/EMEA markets, Haven Global for Australia and New Zealand, and FIR Ventures / Creative Minds for Japan and Greater China.

Today, Fuggler has several collaborations with notable brands such as Jaws, The Lord of the Rings, SpongeBob SquarePants, DC Comics, Gremlins, and Teenage Mutant Ninja Turtles.

== Impact and sales ==
Fuggler appeals to both kids and adults, with hundreds of different toys sold.
