= Anna Mowbray =

New Zealand businessperson

- Born: Anna Jane Mowbray; July 1983 (age 43); New Zealand
- Occupation: Entrepreneur
- Years active: 2005–present
- Known for: Chief operating officer of Zuru; Co-owner of Coatesville mansion Organised delivery of PPE to NZ during COVID-19
- Spouse(s): Blake Wong (divorced) Ali Williams (m. 2024)
- Relatives: Nick Mowbray (brother)

Anna Jane Mowbray (born July 1983) is a New Zealand entrepreneur and businesswoman. Together with her brothers Mat and Nick, she leads the Chinese toy manufacturer Zuru; her role is chief operating officer.

Using her contacts in China, she organised the delivery of personal protective equipment to New Zealand early on during the COVID-19 pandemic.

== Early life ==
Mowbray grew up in Cambridge, New Zealand, and was educated at St Peter's School. Her parents owned a dairy farm in Cambridge.

== Zuru ==
Her brothers relocated to Hong Kong in 2003 to set up the toy manufacturing company Zuru and soon moved to China. She joined them in China in 2005. First based in Guangzhou, the company was shifted to Shenzhen to be closer to Hong Kong (where international buyers come to) and because the Shenzhen workforce is claimed to be more highly educated. As of 2020, Mowbray was Zuru's chief operating officer.

== COVID-19 response ==
Mowbray relocated from Hong Kong to Coatesville north of Auckland in late January 2020 as schools had shut in Hong Kong due to the COVID-19 pandemic. Having experienced the rapid progression of the pandemic in China and Hong Kong, she publicly spoke out on 13 March 2020 and urged the New Zealand government to close the borders to all but returning residents. At the end of March, Mowbray foresaw that there would be a world shortage of personal protective equipment (PPE) and pulled together a team of Zuru staff based in New Zealand and China to procure product. She worked closely with Rob Fyfe, who was appointed by the New Zealand government to undertake business liaison. Several cargo planes chartered by Zuru from Air New Zealand arrived in New Zealand from early April.

== Zeil ==
In 2023, Mowbray launched Zeil (stylised as ZEIL), a New Zealand–based AI job marketplace for employers and jobseekers with an app interface that mimics social media platforms.

== Personal life ==
Mowbray has three children from her first marriage to Blake Wong. Her children were first educated in Shenzhen and then in Hong Kong when she moved there. In 2019, Mowbray began a relationship with Ali Williams, a former All Black, who has two girls from his former marriage, and the couple married in Fiji in August 2024.

The Mowbray siblings bought Coatesville mansion in Coatesville in 2017 for NZ$32.5 million when they were in their early 30s. The mansion is one of New Zealand's most expensive homes and is famous for the January 2012 raid when Kim Dotcom lived there. According to the National Business Review, the net worth of the siblings is NZ$3bn.

In 2020, Mowbray and Williams bought a NZ$24m waterfront property in the Auckland suburb of Westmere; the house was previously owned by film maker Andrew Adamson.

Mowbray also has an investment in the new A League franchise Auckland FC.
