= Mini Brands =

American miniature toys brand

Mini Brands is an American toy brand owned by the toy company, Zuru. The brand consists of a series of miniature toys, many of which advertise real-life brands such as Tapatio, Hershey's and others. The toys are distributed out of Washington, D.C.

== Products ==
Mini Brands was launched in 2019. In 2020 the company launched Series 2 and Toys Mini Brands. In 2021 the company launched Toys Series 2, Series 3, and Pixar Marvel Mini Brands. In 2022 they launched Series 4 and Foodies, which includes fast food brands like Subway.

In 2024, the company collaborated with Ulta Beauty to create a Mini Brands beauty collection.

Series One

The Series 1 Mini Brands are a fun and collectible line of miniature replicas of popular household and beauty products. Each mystery capsule contains five miniatures of well-known brands. Some of the brands included are Skippy, Dove, Warheads, Dum Dums, Pez, and Kikkoman. There are also rare metallic, glow-in-the-dark, and super-rare gold minis to collect.
