= Nick Mowbray =

New Zealand businessman

- Born: Nicholas James Mowbray; March 1985; New Zealand
- Occupation: Entrepreneur
- Years active: 2003–present
- Known for: Co-founder of toy manufacturer Zuru; Co-owner of Coatesville mansion
- Relatives: Anna Mowbray (sister)

Nicholas James Mowbray (born March 1985) is a New Zealand entrepreneur and businessman. Together with his siblings Mat and Anna, he is the co-founder of toy and consumer products manufacturer Zuru.

In 2025 the NBR ranked Nick and Mat Mowbray number one on the New Zealand Rich List, with a combined estimated net worth of NZ$20 billion.

== Early life ==
Mowbray grew up in Cambridge, New Zealand, and was educated at St Peter's School. His parents owned a dairy farm and Matangi dairy factory. As a teenager, he helped his elder brother Mat to manufacture hot air balloons from Coke cans and plastic bags. After school, he started a law degree but dropped out in his first year.

== Zuru ==
In 2003, when the brothers were 18 and 24, they moved to Hong Kong to set up a toy factory. With a loan from their parents, they purchased an injection molding machine and started a company in Guangzhou, China. The Mowbrays regard their entrance into the business world as naïve, as they had no experience, could not speak the local language, and had no knowledge of intellectual property legislation. In 2005, the brothers were joined by their sister Anna in their business.

The initial name of their company was Guru and this was changed to Zuru as Guru had been trademarked by another company. According to Mowbray, by the end of 2020 Zuru employed 8500 people, had 26 offices, and a turnover of over $1 billion. Successful toys included Robo Fish (the world's fastest selling toy in 2013) and Bunch O Balloons (the top selling toy in the United States for three months in 2016). In 2018, Mowbray was awarded New Zealand Entrepreneur of the Year by multinational professional services network Ernst & Young.

== Personal life ==
Aged 26, Mowbray developed Crohn's disease. In his early 30s, he moved back to New Zealand to undergo operations after he was told that without treatment, he only had a few years to live.

The siblings bought Coatesville mansion in Coatesville in 2017 for NZ$32.5 million when they were in their early 30s. The mansion is one of New Zealand's most expensive homes and is famous for the January 2012 raid when Kim Dotcom lived there. In late 2020, Mowbray bought a 40-metre (130 ft) yacht for NZ$21m.

=== Politics ===
In the lead-up to the 2023 general election, Mowbray donated a total of $400k to centre-right to right-wing parties, with the National Party receiving $250k and the ACT Party receiving $150k. He donated a further $100k to the ACT Party in 2024.

In the lead-up to the 2026 general election, Mowbray donated a total of $250k to the National Party and $225k to the ACT Party across several donations.
