= Michael Friedlander (businessman) =

New Zealand businessman (born 1936)

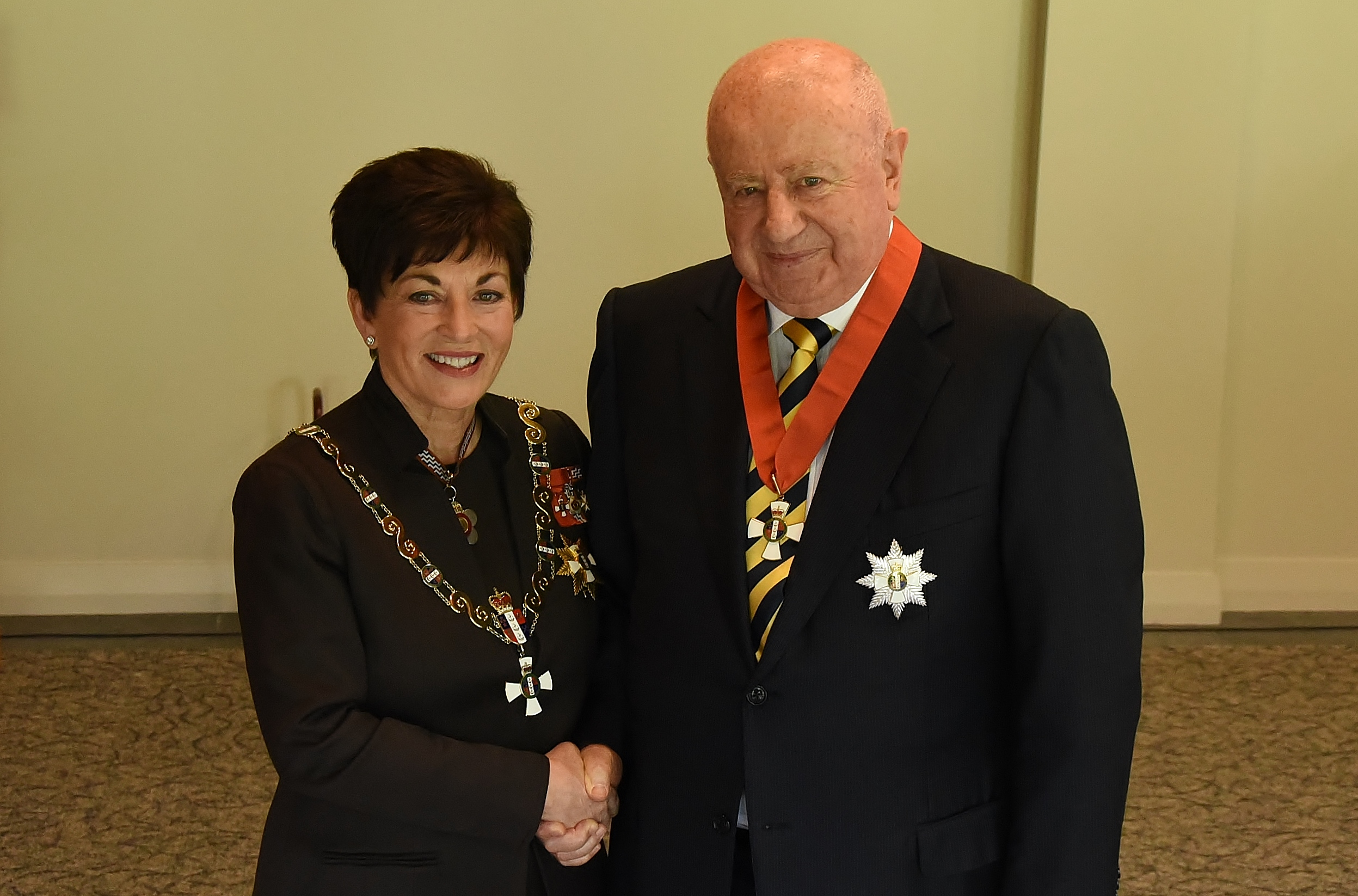
Friedlander in 2016, after his investiture as a Knight Companion of the New Zealand Order of Merit by the governor-general, Dame Patsy Reddy

Sir Michael Friedlander KNZM (born 1936) is a New Zealand businessman.

Friedlander is one of New Zealand's wealthiest people. In the 2010 Queen's Birthday Honours, he was appointed a Companion of the New Zealand Order of Merit, for community services. He was promoted to Knight Companion of the New Zealand Order of Merit, for services to philanthropy, in the 2016 Queen's Birthday Honours.

In 2025 Friedlander's estimated net wealth was $2 billion NZD.
