= Nerf Blaster =

Toy gun firing Nerf darts

Nerf Blasters
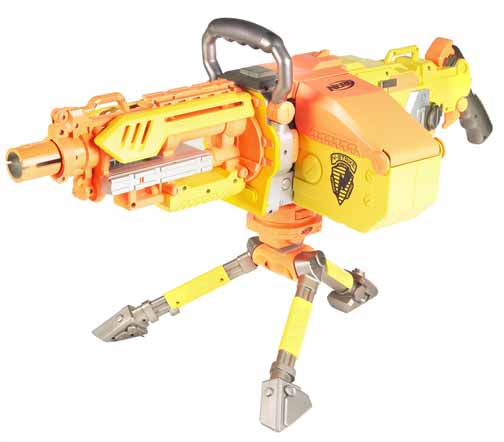
- A rare Nerf N-Strike Vulcan EBF-25
- Type: Toy dart gun
- Invented by: Nerf
- Company: Hasbro
- Country: United States
- Availability: 1989–present
- Materials: Hard plastic
- Slogan: "It's Nerf or Nothin'!" "Accept No Substitutes"
- Official website

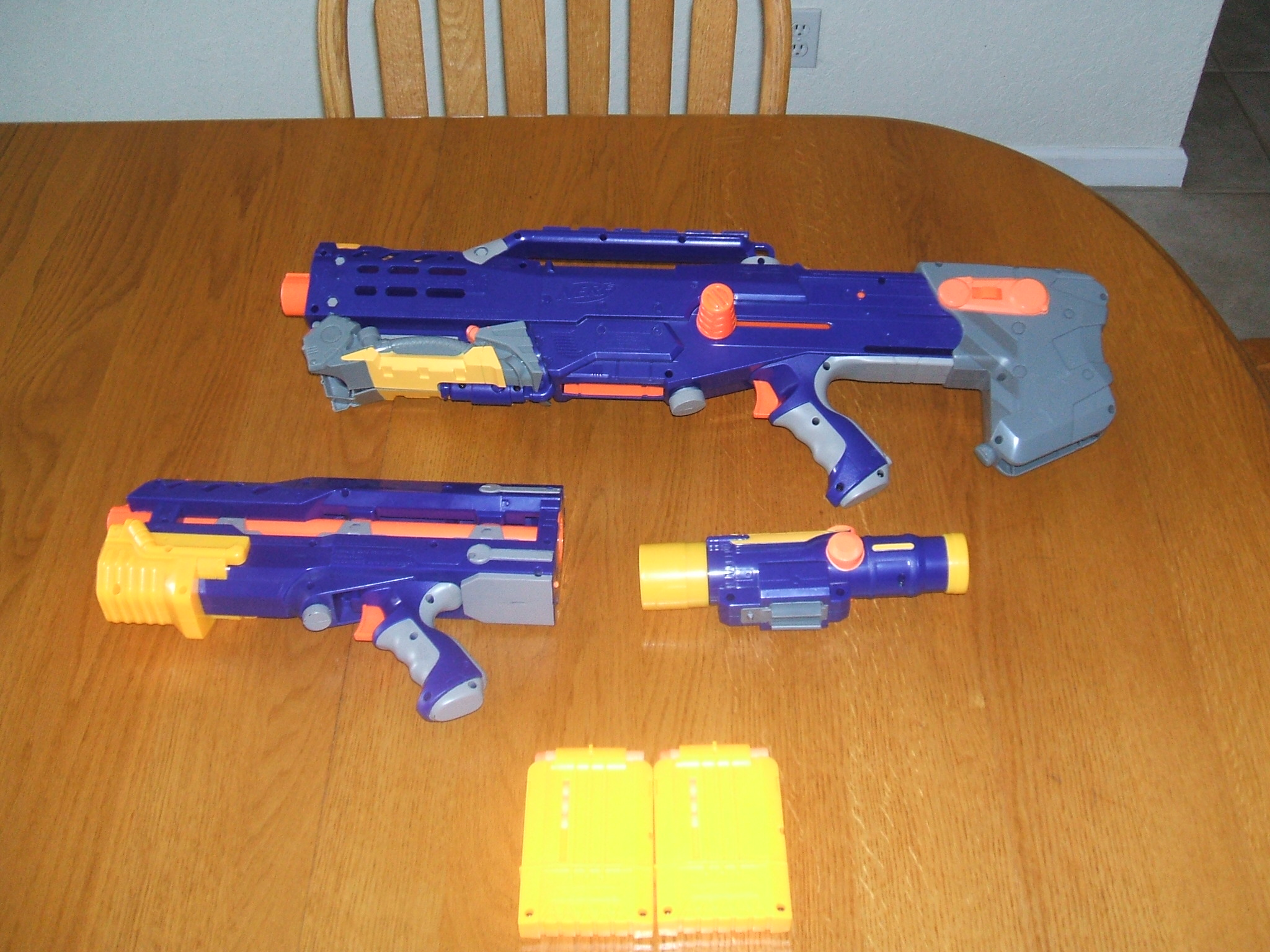
A Nerf N-Strike Longshot CS-6

A Nerf Blaster or Nerf Gun is a toy gun made by Hasbro that fires foam darts, arrows, discs, or foam balls. “Nerf blaster” or more commonly “Nerf gun” are often used to describe the toy. Nerf blasters are manufactured in multiple forms; the first Nerf blasters emerged in the late 1980s with the release of the Nerf Blast-a-Ball (1989) and the Sharpshooter (1992). Today, Hasbro has produced over twenty unique lines of Nerf-brand blasters, with each line centered on a particular theme or type of ammunition. Hasbro has also produced Nerf blasters based on specific franchises, including Marvel Comics, Star Wars, G.I. Joe, Fortnite, Transformers, Overwatch, Halo Infinite, Roblox and Minecraft. Nerf blasters are available in several international marketplaces, although some blasters have their names changed or are not sold in certain countries due to laws surrounding toy safety franchises.

Most Nerf brands are packaged with a set of the ammunition it fires, and ammunition refills are sold separately online and in stores at greater quantities. Some blasters can also be customized with special-made attachments, which are either included with the blaster or sold separately. Many non-Nerf brand blasters are also cross-compatible with Nerf brand darts and magazines in order to take advantage of the name-brand's existing ecosystem.

Nerf blasters have been acclaimed for their popularity, particularly among boys and young adults. Additionally, a community has grown around Nerf blasters, as competitive and casual "Nerf wars” held among enthusiasts in various forms, similar to airsoft and paintball. A significant modding community has also formed among enthusiasts, who aim to improve the performance and accuracy of existing blasters through upgraded parts and different dart or ammo types. Nerf blasters have also gained a significant following in the cosplay community, where fans create intricate costumes and props inspired by their favorite characters. They have also been adopted by schools and youth organizations as a form of active play and team-building exercises.

== Blaster mechanics ==
Nerf blasters feature a variety of internal and external mechanisms that allow the user to prime and discharge ammo. These systems vary from blaster to blaster depending on the type of ammo and propulsion method that the design is centered around. Two common propulsion mechanisms include spring-operated plunger systems and battery-operated flywheel systems, but other variants of these systems exist.

=== Propulsion mechanisms ===
==== Direct plunger ====
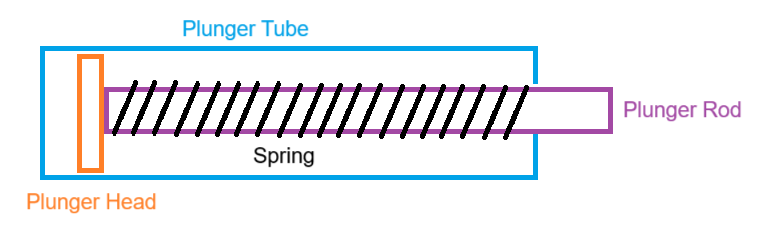
An example diagram of the main components in a direct plunger propulsion mechanism.

The direct plunger system consists of a few main components, including a tube, a spring, and a rod with a head attached to the spring. To cock this mechanism, the user must move a handle attached to the rod in a rearward motion to compress the spring and lock it in place. When the user pulls the blaster's trigger, the lock disengages, which causes the spring to release and force air out through the tube in the direction of the spring's release. The energy generated by the compressed air, in turn, launches the dart or other projectile out through the blaster's barrel apparatus.

Hasbro has featured the direct plunger system in multiple blasters from its modern product lines. In the N-Strike series, for instance, the Longshot CS-6 houses a relatively large direct plunger that fires magazine-fed streamline darts as its ammo type. The system extends to blasters with other projectile types as well, such as the Rush-40 in the Hyper series. As the user slides back the upper priming portion of the blaster, a hopper mechanism agitates a spherical rubber-like Hyper round into a chute, all while compressing the spring-loaded plunger rod.

==== Reverse plunger ====
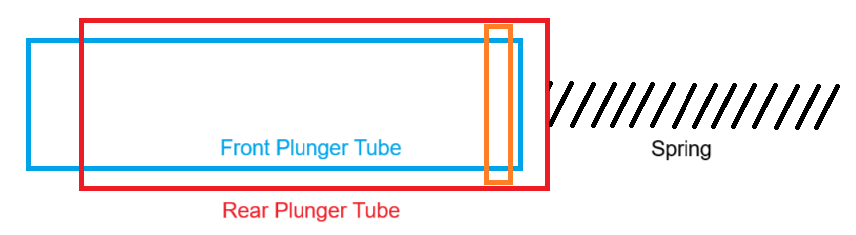
An example diagram of the main components in a reverse plunger propulsion mechanism.

The reverse plunger system operates similarly to the direct plunger mechanism, but there are some notable differences in the system's design. While a direct plunger system uses a rod with a head to propel air into the projectile, a reverse plunger system replaces this component with a rear tubular portion that slides backward to pull air into the system. To cock the mechanism, the user pulls a handle attached to this rear tube backward, which compresses the spring connected to the rear tube and pulls air into the front tube. Like the rod in the direct plunger, this motion engages a catch that locks the rear tube in place. Upon squeezing the trigger, the user disengages this catch, which springs the rear tube forward. As the tube returns forward, air pressure builds in the front tube and discharges the dart or other projectile from the blaster's barrel.

==== Flywheels ====
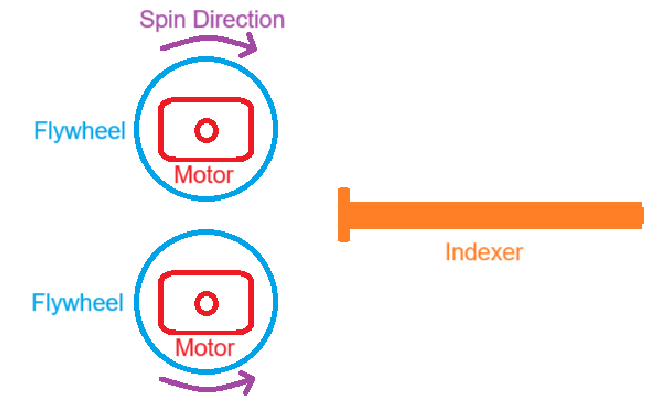
An example diagram of the main components in a flywheel propulsion mechanism.

While most plunger systems in modern Nerf blasters rely on the user to move a handle or other component rearward to store energy in a spring, Hasbro designs most blasters' flywheel systems using battery-driven motors as the effective propulsion method. In these systems a pair of motors spins two opposing wheels, each in the direction of the barrel, in order to impart momentum onto the projectile. To perform this action, the user pulls the blaster's trigger to actuate a mechanical or electronic indexer, which feeds a dart or other projectile into the spinning wheels. The wheels, in turn, apply friction to the dart or other projectile to launch the ammo out through the barrel mechanism.

Many of Hasbro's electronic Nerf blasters utilize flywheels as their favored propulsion mechanism. The N-Strike Elite Rapidstrike CS-18, for instance, features a dual-motor flywheel system powered by four C-cell batteries, whose micro darts are fed with another motorized pusher mechanism. Some flywheel-operated blasters like the N-Strike Elite Stryfe, however, use a combination of mechanical and electronic components to propel darts out of the launch mechanism. Unlike the Rapidstrike CS-18, the Stryfe allows the user to operate a mechanical pusher to feed darts into a pair of motorized flywheels by pulling the blaster's trigger.

== Modern product lines ==
Engineering design of a Nerf Elite Triad EX-3 blaster.

This list consists solely of Nerf brand blasters released since 2003.

=== N-Strike ===
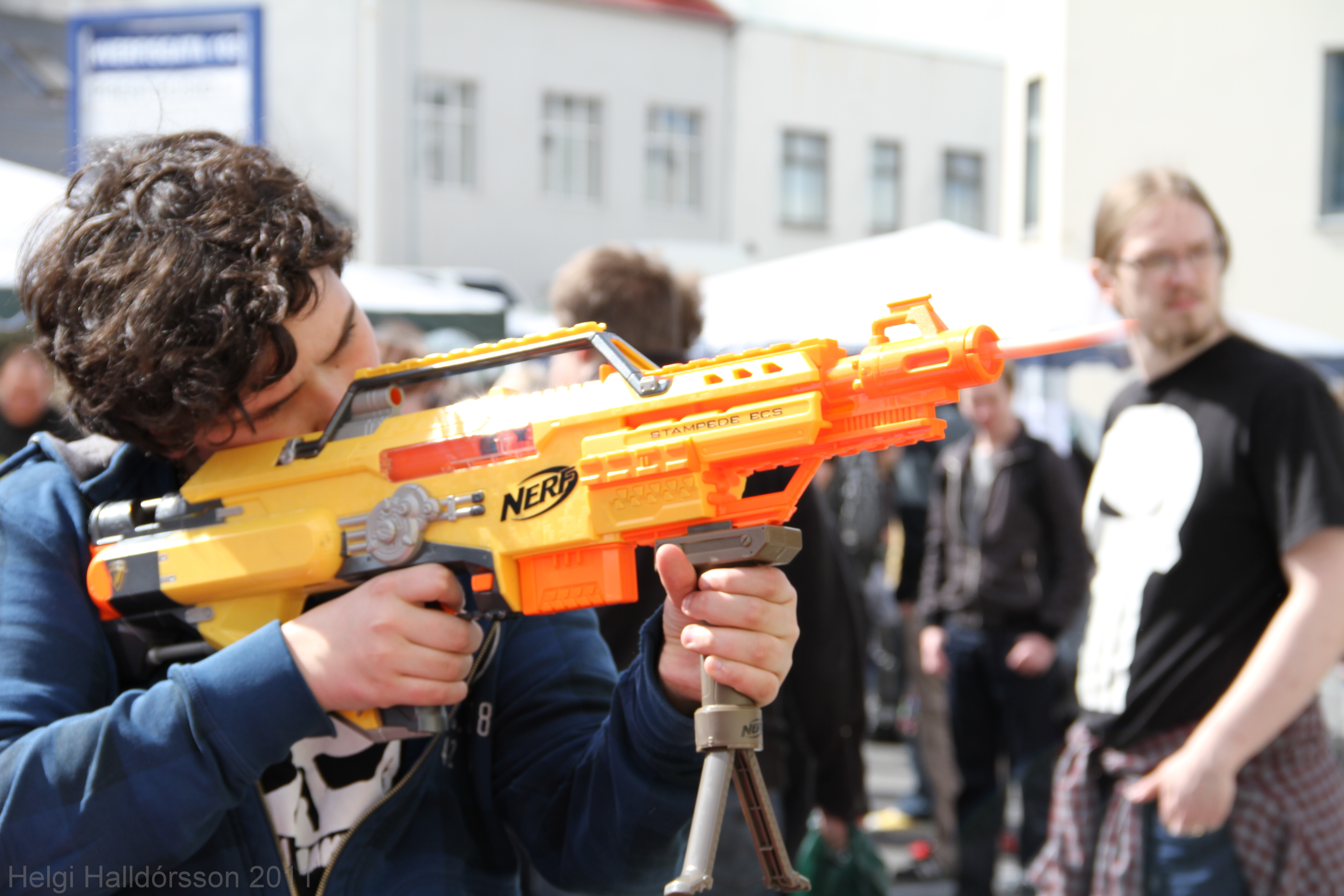
A man firing an N-Strike Stampede ECS

First introduced in 2003, N-Strike blasters established many trends in modern dart blasters. Many features such as tactical rails, barrel and stock attachment points, and magazines (officially referred to by Hasbro as Clips) first appeared in the N-Strike series and characterized the ability for customization, a common sight among today's blasters.

N-Strike also introduced a new dart type, called Micro Darts, which have a body made of colored foam and different types of rubberized plastic tips to improve range and accuracy and offer unique features such as the ability to whistle when flying (Whistler Darts) or sticking to walls via suction cups (Suction Darts). Magazine-fed N-Strike blasters required a different type of dart than non-magazine-fed ones, known as Streamline Darts; however, the ammo type was updated and homogenized between all blaster types with its successor line, N-Strike Elite.

In 2010, the Stampede ECS (a large battery-powered, magazine-fed, AEG-style blaster) was awarded "Boy Toy of the Year" at the 11th Annual Toy of the Year Awards, which is held at the American International Toy Fair in New York City. Popular Mechanics praised it as "the best overall Nerf gun ever", being easy to use and less prone to jamming than earlier battery-powered Nerf models.

==== Clear Series ====
The Clear Series was a limited edition line of certain N-Strike blasters that utilized clear, see-through plastic. They were a Target exclusive in the United States and came packaged with red streamlined darts. Some have complained that the seals in the clear blasters have looser seals, leading to poorer performance. Additionally, the clear plastic has been called "thin" compared to other blasters.

==== Elite Repaint ====
This was an unofficial series in which N-Strike blasters were repainted to imitate N-Strike Elite blasters but were not officially labeled so on the box, and the internals were not updated to match Elite's performance.

==== Gear Up ====
This limited edition line featured certain N-Strike blasters painted orange and black instead of their usual yellow (or blue) color. They were produced as a promotion for Hasbro's then-upcoming Vortex blaster line, and blasters included a sample of the new XLR Disc ammo, used in the Vortex blasters. Due to their brief production period, Gear Up blasters have become highly collectible.

==== Light It Up ====
Blasters in this series came packaged with glow-in-the-dark ammunition. Only two blasters, the N-Strike Rayven CS-18 and the Vortex Lumitron, were released in this line.

==== Red Strike ====
These blasters were only available for Black Friday in 2009 and were repainted N-Strike blasters with a red, black, and grey color scheme. The limited availability of these blasters (Longshot CS-6, Recon CS-6, and Vulcan EBF-25) has led them to become very rare, expensive, and sought after.

==== Sonic FIRE ====
This series featured N-Strike (and N-Strike Elite) blasters with dark translucent red plastic. Only two N-Strike blasters, the Barrel Break IX-2 and the Jolt EX-1, were released in this line.

==== Sonic Series ====
This series featured N-Strike blasters with translucent green plastic. They were a Toys R Us exclusive in the United States.

==== Whiteout Series ====
This series featured repainted N-Strike blasters with a white base with orange and grey detailing. They were a Walmart exclusive in the United States, and some have claimed a performance increase compared to their original counterparts. A fifth Whiteout blaster, a repaint of the N-Strike Spectre REV-5, was expected to be released but was never released, despite online images being found.

==== ICON Series ====
In 2019, the N-Strike ICON series was released to celebrate Nerf's 50th birthday. These were re-releases of original N-Strike blasters with the same paint yellow paint scheme and an ICON Series logo onto the blasters to differentiate older models from newer models. The plunger tube in the ICON Series Longshot CS-6 was made significantly smaller, leading to limited modification potential. The ICON series Element EX-6 was given updated internals to shoot similar to an N-Strike Elite blaster. The ICON Series Magstrike was advertised with a 10-dart clip, though the original Magstrike was advertised with a 10-dart magazine.

=== Dart Tag ===
Released in 2004, Dart Tag features blasters and accessories that are designed for fast-paced, competitive play. All Dart Tag blasters came packaged with Tagger Darts, which feature velcro-tipped heads that allow the dart to stick onto Dart Tag vests. Although most Dart Tag blasters can be used interchangeably with other types of Micro Darts, some Dart Tag blasters, such as the Quick 16 and Speedload 6, will only work reliably with Tagger Darts.

Dart Tag also served as the official sport for Nerf under the Nerf Dart Tag League name.

=== Vortex ===
The Vortex series, launched in 2011, features blasters that use XLR (Xtra Long Range) foam discs as opposed to darts. These discs are capable of traveling at greater distances than darts fired from original N-Strike blasters (up to 65 feet (20 m)) and can also ricochet off walls. The Vortex series also features several subseries, including:

==== Multishot Madness ====
This subseries, shared with N-Strike Elite, advertised blasters that can shoot two darts at once. Multishot Madness featured only two blasters; the Vortex Diatron and the Elite Rough Cut 2x4.

==== Vortex VTX ====
This subseries is a relaunch of the Vortex series, released in fall 2018. The Vortex VTX subseries features only three blasters: the Praxis, Pyragon, and Vigilon.

=== N-Strike Elite ===
On August 1, 2012, the N-Strike series was succeeded by N-Strike Elite, which featured original N-Strike blasters but with new and improved internal mechanisms for better performance. Firing distances for N-Strike Elite blasters are advertised as up to 75 feet (23 m) for U.S. models, while international models (identifiable by their grey triggers) have a maximum firing distance of 15 metres (49 ft). The average Elite blaster fires darts at around 70 ft/s (21 m/s). N-Strike Elite also featured new, blue-colored Micro Darts, known as Elite Darts, which feature shorter dart head stems that allows for lighter weight and better stability when flying. The series was succeeded in 2020 by the N-Strike Elite 2.0 series.

In 2014, Hasbro released Elite blasters with a slightly updated color scheme and advertised with improved ranges of 85 to 90 feet (26 to 27 m) for US models and 72 feet (22 m) for international models; these blasters are referred to as Elite XD blasters. However, Hasbro later adjusted their marketing campaign for these blasters to no longer claim performance improvements after consumers found them to be negligible.

Several subseries have been released under the N-Strike Elite line, including:

==== AccuStrike Series ====
The AccuStrike Series is a subseries released in spring 2017. While some AccuStrike blasters are unique to the line and others are re-skins of blasters from other lines, all blasters include the AccuStrike Dart, which features improved accuracy over Elite Darts due to a specially designed dart head. All AccuStrike Darts and blasters are cross-compatible with those of the N-Strike Elite line. Later Rebelle blasters came packaged with specially colored AccuStrike Darts.

==== BattleCamo Series ====
This subseries featured re-painted Elite blasters (and one Mega blaster) featuring a white, blue, or red camouflage color scheme.

==== Micro Shots ====
This subseries features reshelled variants of the Jolt EX-1 but is designed after other blasters across different series.

==== Sonic ICE ====
These blasters feature translucent blue plastic, similar to the N-Strike Sonic Series. The Sonic ICE subseries also includes Mega Blasters.

=== Mega ===
Mega (originally known as N-Strike Elite Mega until 2016) is a series of blasters that fire red-colored darts that are larger in both size and diameter when compared to Elite darts. Nerf advertises Mega blasters as firing at "mega" ranges of up to 100 feet (30 m). They are also designed to whistle through the air when fired, similar to the N-Strike Whistler Darts.

In 2018, the AccuStrike Series expanded to Mega Blasters with the release of the Thunderhawk, the first Mega Blaster to come packaged with the Mega AccuStrike Dart. Similar to the original AccuStrike Dart, these darts feature a specially designed dart tip that allows for improved accuracy.

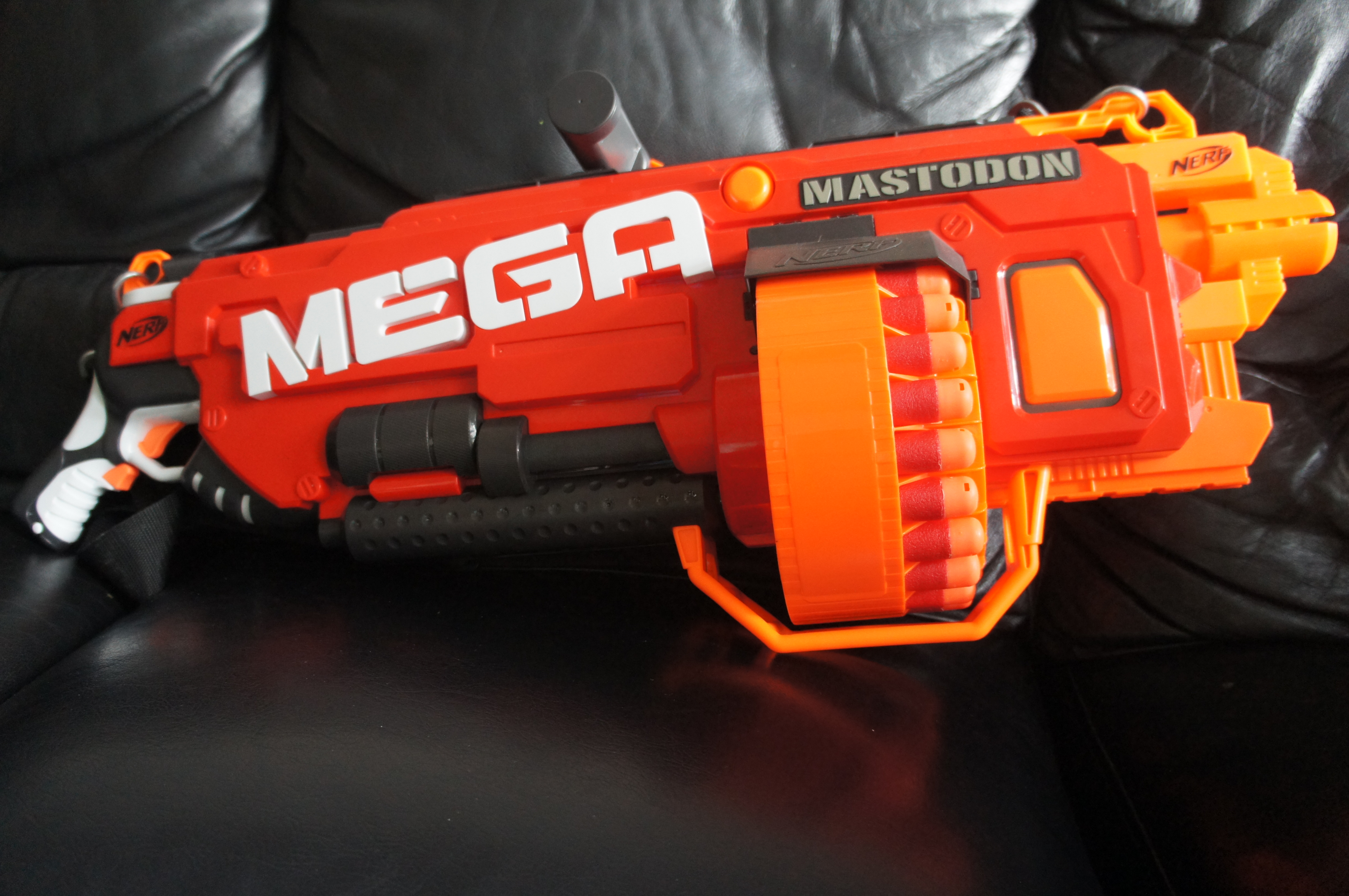
A Nerf Mega Mastodon

=== Rebelle ===
The Rebelle series was introduced in the fall of 2013 and features blasters that are similar to existing blasters in terms of operation and internal mechanisms but aimed at the female demographic. As such, Rebelle blasters incorporate feminine designs and pastel colors. The Rebelle series also includes the following subseries:

==== Charmed ====
These Rebelle blasters come packaged with charms and feature a medieval aesthetic.

==== Secrets & Spies ====
These Rebelle blasters come packaged with unique darts that feature a hidden message. These messages cannot be read easily without a decoder.

==== Super Stripes ====
These Rebelle blasters feature a zebra stripe pattern.

=== Zombie Strike ===
The Zombie Strike series was introduced in 2013 and contains blasters that are themed around a zombie apocalypse. While early Zombie Strike blasters seemed to have a Western aesthetic, such as the Hammershot (hammer-action revolver) and Slingfire (lever-action rifle), newer Zombie Strike blasters followed a distinctive DIY theme. The Zombie Strike series also had several subseries, including:

==== Biosquad ====
These blasters are capable of firing three different types of ammo; darts, water, or "Zombie Repellent", which is similar to silly string. Darts are fired by a manual pump, while the Zombie Repellent cans and the water canister can be fired by pulling the trigger.

==== Power Shock ====
Stylized as POWER SHOCK, this subseries features blasters with built-in lights and sounds, themed around the human survivors discovering a way to power their blasters.

==== Survival System ====
These blasters focus on optional attachments and enhanced customization, similar to the Modulus line.

==== Z.E.D. Squad ====
These blasters were re-releases of older blasters with a new color scheme.

=== Doomlands 2169 ===
Released in 2015, Doomlands blasters follow a post-apocalyptic theme, similar to Zombie Strike. All Doomlands blasters can be distinguished by their orange color scheme with a clear window on one side that allows the priming mechanism to be seen.

==== Impact Zone ====
This Doomlands subseries features futuristic blasters in a white color scheme while retaining the clear window that allows the internal mechanisms to be seen.

=== N-Strike Modulus ===
N-Strike Modulus is a subseries of the N-Strike Elite series with an emphasis on user customization through attachments and accessories. Many Modulus blasters came packaged with a variety of new and unique attachments; for example, the Nerf Modulus Tri-Strike came included with attachments for launching Mega darts and foam missiles in addition to the standard N-Strike Elite darts. These blasters are typically white and grey, with additional accent colors such as green, blue, or orange.

==== Ghost Ops ====
The only subseries of N-Strike Modulus, all Ghost Ops blasters and accessories are made out of clear plastic, similar to the N-Strike Clear Series.

=== RIVAL ===
Released in 2015, RIVAL blasters are targeted towards teenagers and young adults. These blasters fire spherical foam balls (often called “Rival rounds”) instead of darts, as well as increased performance in comparison to Elite blasters. Many RIVAL blasters and accessories are colored either blue or red to distinguish teams for competitive play. Because of its increased performance, the RIVAL series is not available in Australia due to toy regulations. Subseries of RIVAL include:

==== Camo Series ====
Released in 2018, these RIVAL blasters are re-skinned with a camouflage color scheme.

==== Curve Shot ====
These RIVAL blasters feature a new color scheme (orange and white) and hop-up muzzles that are adjustable to allow the blaster to shoot in different directions.

==== Edge Series ====
Released in 2019, these blasters are green in color emphasizing target shooting rather than competitive play. All blasters exclusive to this sub-series are colored lime green and black and are modeled after competition weapons.

==== Phantom Corps ====
Released in 2017, Phantom Corps blasters are white and black and include special flags that attach to the sling mounts to mark which team the blaster belongs to.

=== Nitro ===
Nitro is a brand of blasters that fire foam cars instead of darts. Each Nitro set includes accessories such as obstacles to hit and ramps to launch the cars in the air.

=== Alpha Strike ===
Introduced in August 2019, the Alpha Strike series features blasters that are priced much lower and built more cheaply compared to other Nerf lines. Designed as a budget series, it was introduced to compete with blasters from competing brands, which often sell for lower prices than their Nerf brand counterparts. Most of the Alpha Strike blasters are simple, spring-powered blasters that fire one dart at time (single-shot), except the Flyte, which is a battery-powered blaster similar to the N-Strike Elite Stryfe. Most Alpha Strike blasters do not feature any sort of accessory attachment points, such as tactical rails, stock attachment points, or barrel extension points.

=== Ultra ===
Released in September 2019, Nerf Ultra (branded as ULTRA) blasters fire a new proprietary dart design that is marketed as firing upwards of 120 feet (37 m), the farthest advertised distance of any Nerf brand blaster to date. Ultra Darts are constructed from a lightweight foam that is notably different than traditional darts in that they are made with closed-cell foam rather than open-cell. This construction allows for fins to be molded into the rear of the darts. Ultra Darts are sized in between Elite and Mega darts in diameter, but shorter than both in length. Ultra Darts and blasters are not cross-compatible with ammo from other Nerf lines, a decision made in response to the growing number of third-party darts available for N-Strike Elite blasters at a much lower cost than Nerf-brand darts. Many Ultra blasters are black and white, with “ULTRA” emblazoned on one side in gold text.

Despite Ultra claiming to be the best for range, it does not do as well as claimed in terms of performance. For example, the Ultra One, the first blaster released in the Ultra series, features marginally better performance when compared to N-Strike Elite blasters. However, the release of newer blasters such as the Ultra Two and Ultra Pharaoh and the new Ultra AccuStrike Darts have significantly improved performance and accuracy, respectively.

=== Elite 2.0 ===
Released in fall 2020, Elite 2.0 is the successor to N-Strike Elite. Hasbro advertises these new teal-colored blasters as improvements over their original counterparts, with a level of customizability comparable to the Modulus series and packaged with double the amount of Elite Darts to fully load the blaster.

Elite 2.0 has received criticism for its cheaper build quality, worse in comparison to N-Strike Elite and instead comparable to the budget line, Alpha Strike. Many of these blasters are clipped and solvent welded together instead of being screwed together, which makes access to the internals much more difficult in the event of broken parts or modification. One of the inaugural Elite 2.0 blasters, the Warden DB-8 (the successor to the Rough Cut 2x4), has become infamous for the fragility of its priming mechanism. Despite these flaws, newer Elite 2.0 blasters have seen an improvement in build quality and have reverted to using screws instead of clips and solvent welding.

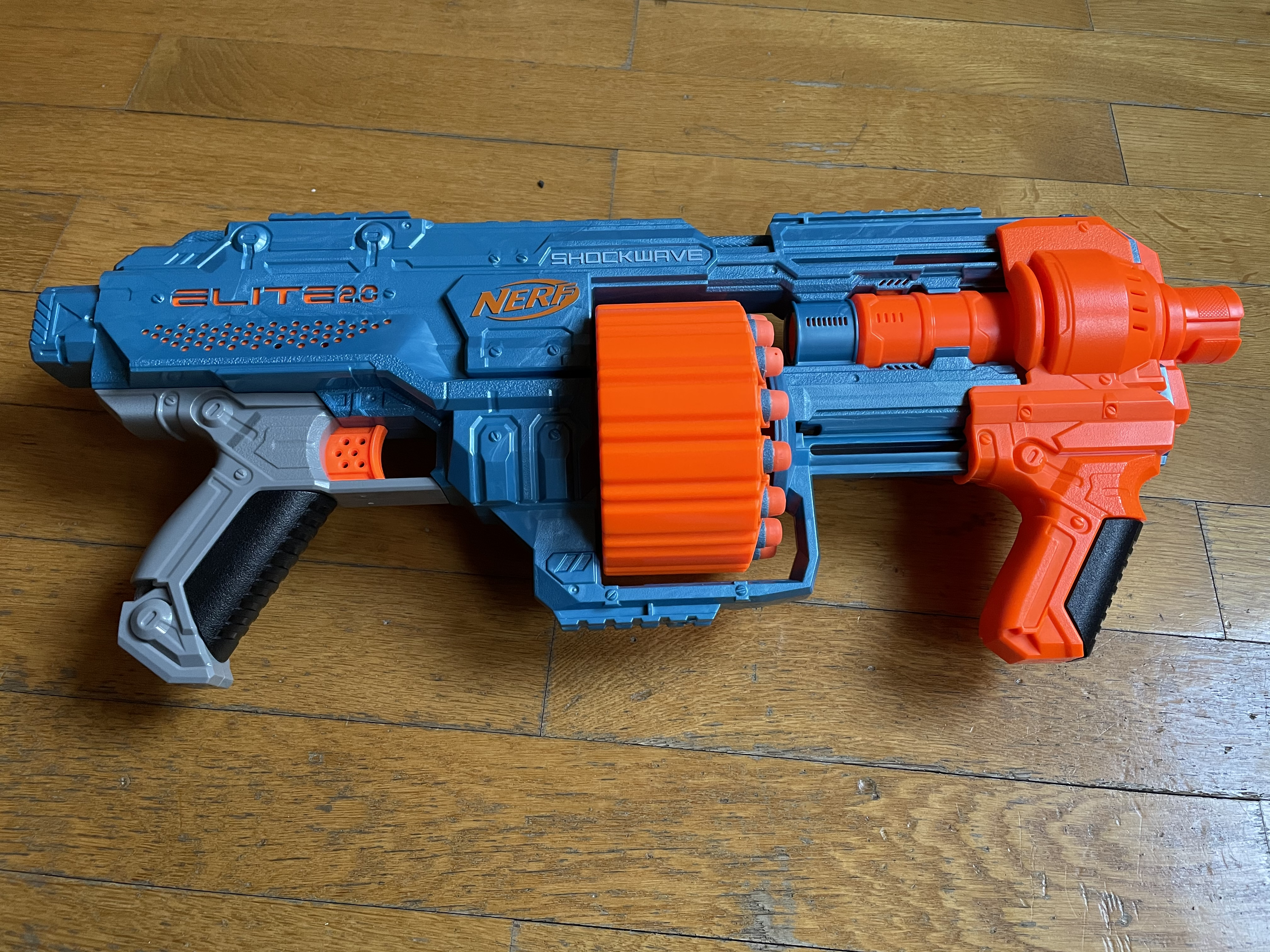
A nerf Elite 2.0 blaster

There are two subseries within Elite 2.0:

==== Flipshots ====
Introduced in 2021, these blasters feature a flipping barrel system that reveals a hidden set of barrels, allowing for double the capacity then what may initially be seen.

==== Wild Edition ====
These blasters feature a blue and light blue tiger stripe camouflage color scheme.

=== DinoSquad ===
Released in spring 2021, DinoSquad blasters feature a unique dinosaur-themed design, similar to blasters released under the Max Force series in the mid-to-late 1990s. Each blaster is named after a particular type of dinosaur, which also serves as the design basis for that particular blaster.

=== Hyper ===
Released in 2021, Hyper blasters are high-performance, high-capacity blasters that utilize large hoppers and a new ammo type that is similar to RIVAL rounds but is smaller and made out of a rubber-like material. These two series are not cross-compatible.

=== Mega XL ===
An expansion of the Mega series, the Mega XL series features blasters that use the Mega XL Dart, which are larger than the standard Mega Dart.

=== Elite Jr. ===
Introduced in 2023, the Elite Jr. series features simple, easy-to-use blasters aimed at a younger demographic. These blasters feature bright colors and oversized triggers and internals.

=== Nerf Pro ===
Launched on October 15, 2023, the Nerf Pro series was designed in response to the growing amount of enthusiast-oriented dart blasters available. The inaugural product, the Stryfe X, utilizes features that are commonly found on most high-performance battery-powered blasters, such as a lithium polymer battery, 180-sized motors, high-flow microswitches, and exclusively using half-length darts, which are considered aerodynamically superior to a standard-length Micro Dart. The Nerf Pro series features one subseries: Nerf Pro GelFire, the name for all Hasbro gel blasters.

== See also ==
- Foam dart blaster
- Nerf war
- Nerf Arena Blast – First-person shooter game for the PC using Nerf Blasters.
- Nerf N-Strike and Nerf N-Strike Elite – First person shoot em up games for the Wii using Nerf Blasters.
- Lazer Tag – Laser tag guns currently sold under the Nerf brand.
