= Zuru (company) =

Hong Kong toy company

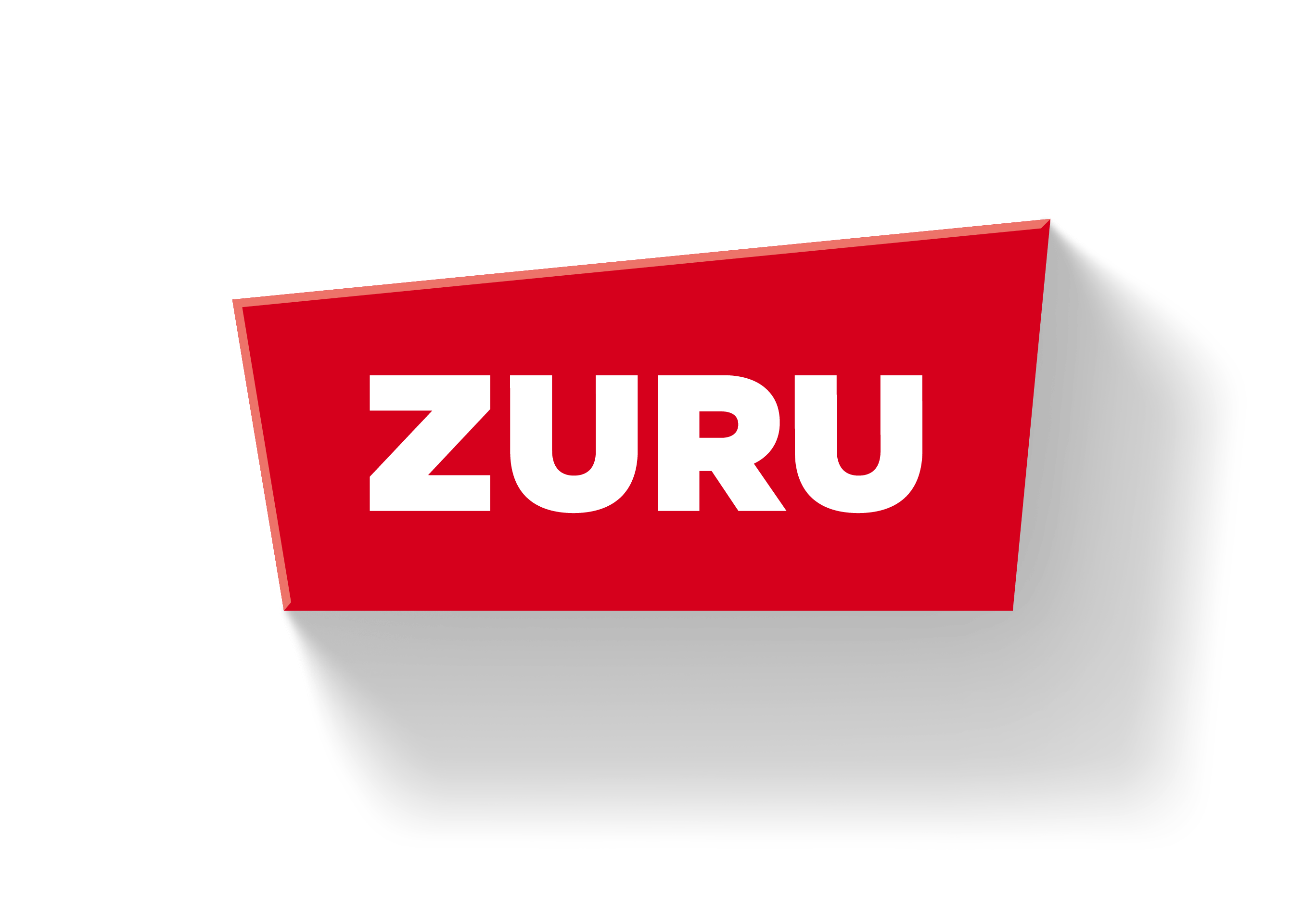
- Logo used since 2023
- Type: Private
- Industry: Toys; Consumer goods
- Founded: 2003; 23 years ago
- Founder: Nick Mowbray, Mat Mowbray, & Anna Mowbray
- Headquarters: Hong Kong
- Brands: Bunch O Balloons; X-Shot; Rainbocorns; Max: Build More; Mini Brands; Robo Alive Smashers; 5 Surprise; Fuggler; Pets Alive; Gumi Yum
- Website: zuru.com

Zuru is a Hong Kong–based toy company founded in 2003 by New Zealand-born siblings, Nick, Mat and Anna Mowbray. The company manufactures multiple brands of toys and consumer goods products.

== History ==
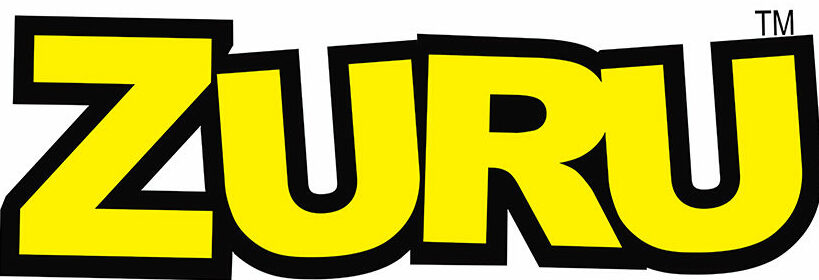
The old logo used from 2003 to 2023

When Nick Mowbray was twelve in 1997, he designed and created a hot air balloon model kit, which won at a national science fair in New Zealand. He started selling the kits with his 18-year-old brother, Mat, as a first mini business of also delivering. They sold their kits throughout high school, and eventually decided to attend university. They returned to delivering kits after one year of university.

In 2003, the Mowbray brothers moved to Hong Kong from New Zealand and started a factory in Guangzhou, China. They were financed with a $20,000 loan from their parents, which they used to buy an injection molding machine. Soon after, they ran into difficulties due to a lack of managerial and administrative experience, communication skills, and knowledge of intellectual property legislation. In 2005, their sister Anna joined the business. The company was named Zuru after they discovered their original name had been trademarked by a different company.

Walmart later expressed interest in Zuru's products and began selling them in their stores. X-Shot was launched in 2011. Mini Brands was launched in 2019.

In November 2024, CBS News 8 reported on a Zuru product that featured "violent" language on its packaging. The phrases and words manic, motorized rage fire, berzerko, mad mega barrel, and insanity were on boxes marketed towards children.

In December 2024, Zuru announced that they would be introducing a "comprehensive branding in the toy aisles of Checkers" and partnering with various toy retailers as Zuru plans to set a new standard and reinforce customers' interest in its brand in South Africa. Zuru also plans "to stand out in a competitive toy market" on its new strategy.

== Recognition ==
In 2022, Crazy Bunch O Balloons by Zuru won the Outdoor Toy of the Year award.

In December 2024, the Mowbrays were named 'visionary leaders of the year' at the 2024 Deloitte Top 200 Awards.

== Brands ==
As of 2024, the company operates four main divisions: ZURU Toys, ZURU Edge, ZURU Tech, and Rhodes Pet Science. Zuru created a variety of brands over the years including X-Shot, Bunch O Balloons, 5 Surprise, Mini Brands, X-Shot Water, Rainbocorn, Gumi Yum, and Snackles. They also partnered with The Walt Disney Company, Nickelodeon, Universal Studios, and DreamWorks.

=== Partnership ===
In 2024, the company announced a collaboration with Ulta Beauty in designing a first-ever beauty Mini Brands collection. They also launched a partnership with KFC.

== Litigation ==
On November 7, 2022, Zuru used the US courts to get the names and details of former employees who left negative comments on review site Glassdoor. Zuru filed in a California court to subpoena Glassdoor for information about posters who wrote scathing reviews of the workplace environment and management at Zuru. Zuru was successful in the courtroom, defeating the defendant, Glassdoor.

=== Trademark infringement ===
In May 2019, Zuru had settled all pending infringement proceedings with Telebrands and Bulbhead.com LLC for making ZURU Bunch O Balloons product similar to their Balloon Bonanza, Battle Balloons and Easy Einstein products. Their settlement issued a full payment of $31 million final judgment, including additional substantial payment for Telebrands' product infringement and an agreement that they will not sell any of their accused products.

In 2020, Zuru was blocked by Lego from making its version of minifigures, as the court found ZURU infringed upon Lego's trademark.

Zuru was also sued by Lego for its ZURU Max Build More building sets, for saying that it was compatible with Lego.

In December 2025, the Court of Appeal of New Zealand overturned a 2023 High Court ruling finding that Zuru's use of the word Lego on its "Max Build More" toy building packaging infringed on Lego's trademark.
